= Farrah Maalik =

Fictional character from Hollyoaks

- Hollyoaks character
- Portrayed by: Krupa Pattani
- Duration: 2017–19
- First appearance: 6 June 2017
- Last appearance: 28 May 2019
- Introduced by: Bryan Kirkwood
In-universe information
- Occupation: Clinical psychologist
- Father: Kashif Maalik
- Mother: Misbah Maalik
- Brothers: Imran Maalik
- Sisters: Yasmine Maalik
- Half-brothers: Sami Maalik; Shaq Qureshi
- Aunts: Kameela; Hasina
- First cousins: Dillon Ray

Farrah Maalik is a fictional character from the British soap opera Hollyoaks, played by Krupa Pattani. The character and casting was announced in April 2017 and Pattani's first appearance as Farrah aired on 6 June 2017. Farrah was introduced as the sister of Yasmine Maalik (Haiesha Mistry) and the daughter of Misbah Maalik (Harvey Virdi) as part of a new Muslim family on Hollyoaks. Farrah is a clinical psychologist and was characterised as being honest, feisty and confident. As part of the character's androgynous, Pattani had to cut her hair and she also had tattoos painted on. Pattani enjoyed playing a lesbian Muslim character and found it intriguing that these aspect of Farrah's identity did not define her. Hollyoaks executive producer Bryan Kirkwood revealed that the soap intended to introduce a new lesbian character and a Muslim family and so combine the two aspects to create Farrah.

Farrah's initial storyline sees her move to the Hollyoaks village to take a new job at the hospital and she catches the eye of Esther Bloom (Jazmine Franks). One of Farrah's new patients is revealed to be Esther's estranged wife Kim Butterfield (Daisy Wood-Davis), who takes a strong liking to Farrah. Farrah and Kim eventually begin a romantic relationship, although Misbah is concerned about this due to the risk on Farrah's job. Kirkwood explained that he did not want Farrah to have a coming out in a Muslim family storyline as it had already happened on BBC soap opera EastEnders and he believed that having an accepting Muslim family showed progress. Kim is later kidnapped by Ryan Knight (Duncan James) and Farrah tries to find Kim. When Kim is eventually rescued, Farrah struggles to support her and ends up cheating on Kim with Grace Black (Tamara Wall). This leads to Kim being shot by Grace's ex-boyfriend Glenn Donovan (Bob Cryer) and Farrah works with several other women to take down Glenn.

After Kim leaves the village after taking the blame for Glenn's death, Farrah begins a relationship with Grace. Their relationship is challenged when Farrah received a job offer abroad, and when Grace is run over by her brother Liam Donovan (Jude Monk McGowan), he manipulates Grace into breaking up with Farrah to protect his secret. This leads to Farrah leaving the village and her last appearance aired on 28 May 2019. Pattani revealed that her departure was a mutual decision between her and Kirkwood and that she had enjoyed her time on the soap but wanted to explore other acting opportunities. Farrah was well-received by critics and viewers. Farrah's opening scene, which saw her come into the village on the back of a motorcycle and kiss a woman, was considered memorable, whilst her departure was viewed as emotional.

== Casting and characterisation ==
In April 2017, it was announced that Hollyoaks would be introducing the family of new character Yasmine Maalik (Haiesha Mistry), consisting of her sister Farrah and their mother Misbah Maalik (Harvey Virdi). It was reported that Krupa Pattani had been cast as Farrah Maalik, who was described as having a "feisty, hilarious and roaring" personality. Farrah was characterised as being a clinical psychologist and making people "gasp" with her "blunt honesty". Pattani said that she was "thrilled" to be joining the soap, commenting, "I can't believe I'm getting to play such a unique and free-spirited character like Farrah in such a wonderful family as the Maaliks". Farrah's family was later joined by Farrah's younger brother Imran Maalik (Ijaz Rana) and their half-brother Sami Maalik (Rishi Nair) later in 2017, with it being reported that the family would have a bigger role in the soap.

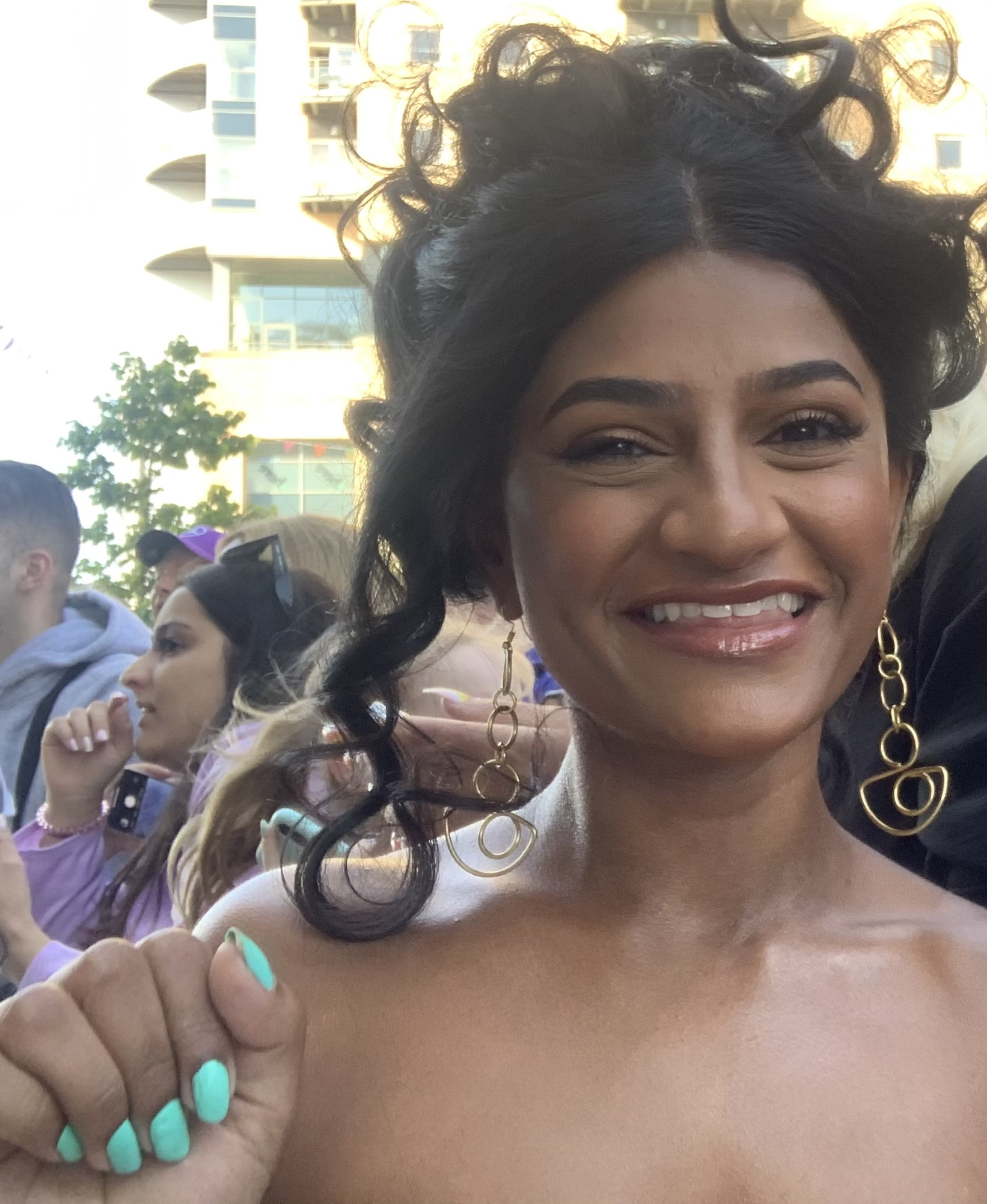
Farrah is introduced as the sister of Yasmine Maalik, played by Haiesha Mistry (pictured).

Hollyoaks executive producer Bryan Kirkwood called Farrah "brilliant", saying, "No doubt she's going to be a divisive character, but I'm really proud of Krupa's performance – I think it's really strong, really unique and an original voice in soap. In Farrah's case, I would like her to be a role model". Whilst speaking at the Royal Television Society's 2017 panel "LGBTQ in Soap: Job Done?", Kirkwood said that he had avoided having Farrah have a storyline where she comes out to her Muslim family as it had already been done in BBC soap opera EastEnders through the character of Syed Masood (Marc Elliott), which Kirkwood believed had been done well, so the Hollyoaks producers decided to have a "modern Muslim family" who accept their daughter. He added that "Farrah being accepted by her mum Misbah" could only have happened after the EastEnders storyline. Kirkwood revealed, "We were bringing in a Muslim family and we also wanted to bring in a new lesbian character to be an antagonist for Kim and Esther. So then we thought, why not bring in a lesbian character within a Muslim family?" Pattani said that she wanted to explore Farrah being herself, explaining, "She's a gay, Muslim woman with an androgynous look, which in itself is quite different from other characters in Hollyoaks. I'd like to see what comes across her path".

Pattani told Soaplife that Farrah is not like any other female character in Hollyoaks, calling her "confident, passionate and openly gay" and revealing that Farrah could cause a "stir" and does not apologise for who she is. Pattani explained that Farrah is close to her mother and sister and "interested in people", calling the character "well educated, quick-witted and brilliant at her job". Pattani also hinted that Farrah could be hiding some secrets, commenting that the character "comes across" as having "everything sorted with this great job and the ability to handle everything, but she has a dark past and it's not to do with her sexuality. It's just part of who she is." Pattani had previously had minor roles in the soap operas EastEnders and Emmerdale and these experiences made her want to be in more soaps, but she did not believe that it would happen. She revealed that she was very grateful to be Hollyoaks, adding, "Everyone is really lovely and the other cast members have taken me out for dinner and stuff". For the role, Pattani relocated from London to Liverpool. Pattani had watched Hollyoaks when she was younger and had been interested that the soap had previously tackled a storyline about male rape. Pattani believed that it was important to support all soap operas despite being "Team Hollyoaks all the way".

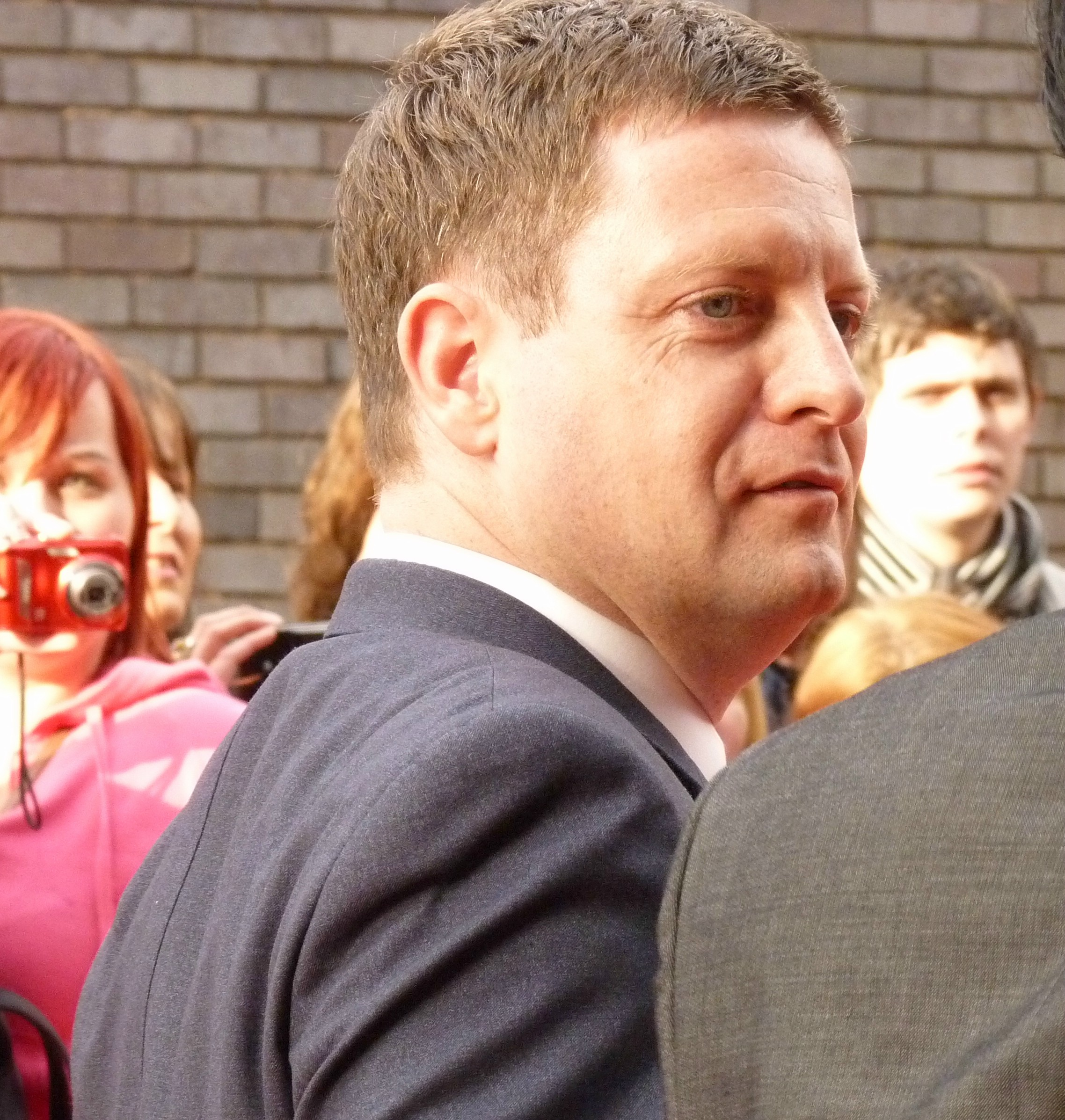
Executive producer Bryan Kirkwood (pictured) wanted Farrah to be considered a role model.

Pattani said that she was really excited when Farrah's character was pitched to her as she had not seen a gay Muslim women in a soap opera before and was happy that Farrah was several minorities. Pattani found it intriguing that Farrah's minorities did not define her, with Pattani explaining that the soap never had to explain that she is gay or Muslim. Pattani explained that Farrah is just a human being trying to be happy like everyone else. Pattani revealed that Farrah's tattoos were not real and were painted onto her instead, explaining, "I have to have them put on in make-up whenever I wear short sleeves. It's quite exciting having tattoos. I don't have any in real-life and it's made me think I might actually get one". She revealed that the tattoos take about an hour to put on. Pattani's favourite tattoo of Farrah's was the tiger on a bed of roses as she believed that it symbolised the spirit of Farrah's character – "fierce, but also a softie!" Pattani had her hair cut short for the role, which she found "really exciting" and a change from her previous role where she had to be "really girlie"; she admitted that she need "adjusting" to the style change but ended up having "fun" with her new short hair. The actress explained that the creative team at Hollyoaks wanted her to cut her hair as it was part of Farrah's androgynous look and identity. She believed that Farrah is feminine in herself but also dresses a bit masculine.

In 2018, Pattani said that she loved being part of the Maalik family unit, calling it "amazing" and "really fun", and explained that the cast would become "protective" of each other like a real family due to working so closely together. Pattani added that she liked the "playful banter" that they had and revealed that the unit tried to organise meals out together but had not achieved it often due to the difficulty in finding a suitable time. She also revealed that Virdi would treat the rest of the units as her "babies" and was caring and protective towards them. Pattani had worked with Virdi before on Citizen Khan, where Virdi played the mother-in-law of Pattani's character, which Pattani called a "pleasure". Pattani has said that she would be friends with Farrah in real-life as she is "nice", "normal" and "loyal". The actress explained that Hollyoaks initially wanted Farrah to be a role model, which worried Pattani that the character would be boring; however, she believed that the character had always tried to do the right thing and had been involved in a lot of drama, with Pattani adding that Farrah was "flawed" like everyone else and that she has "plenty to say for herself". Compared to her previous minor roles in soap operas, Pattani was glad to be portraying a "fully fledged character" and having her own story, which she believed was more fulfilling as an actor. She also believed that actors end up playing versions of themselves in soap operas due to the process being so fast. Pattani revealed that she had been recognised by Hollyoaks fans, with some screaming and running away whilst others said hello to her. The actress also revealed that she shared a dressing room with Virdi, Amy Conachan (Courtney Campbell), Sophie Porley (Ellie Nightingale) and Lizzie Stavrou (DS Roxy Cassidy), and that they would chat or "chill" in between scenes.

== Development ==
=== Introduction ===
Farrah's first appearance aired on 6 June 2017. Farrah arrives in the Hollyoaks village on the back of a motorbike and she kisses the girl that she is travelling with before saying goodbye, which is noticed by Esther Bloom (Jazmine Franks) when Yasmine is asking to get a job at her café. It is then revealed that Farrah has gotten a job as the new clinical psychologist at the hospital in the village. Discussing the character's occupation, Pattani called Farrah "a healer of mental health" and joked that that meant that she would be "busy" in the village because of this. The actress also explained that Farrah has moved to the village as she has started a "new phase" in her life and because her mother and sister are there. It was teased that Farrah would make "quite the impression" on an established character, which was later revealed to be Tony Hutchinson (Nick Pickard).

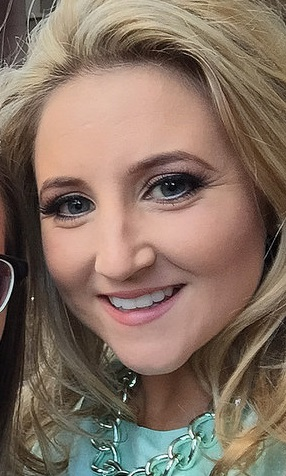
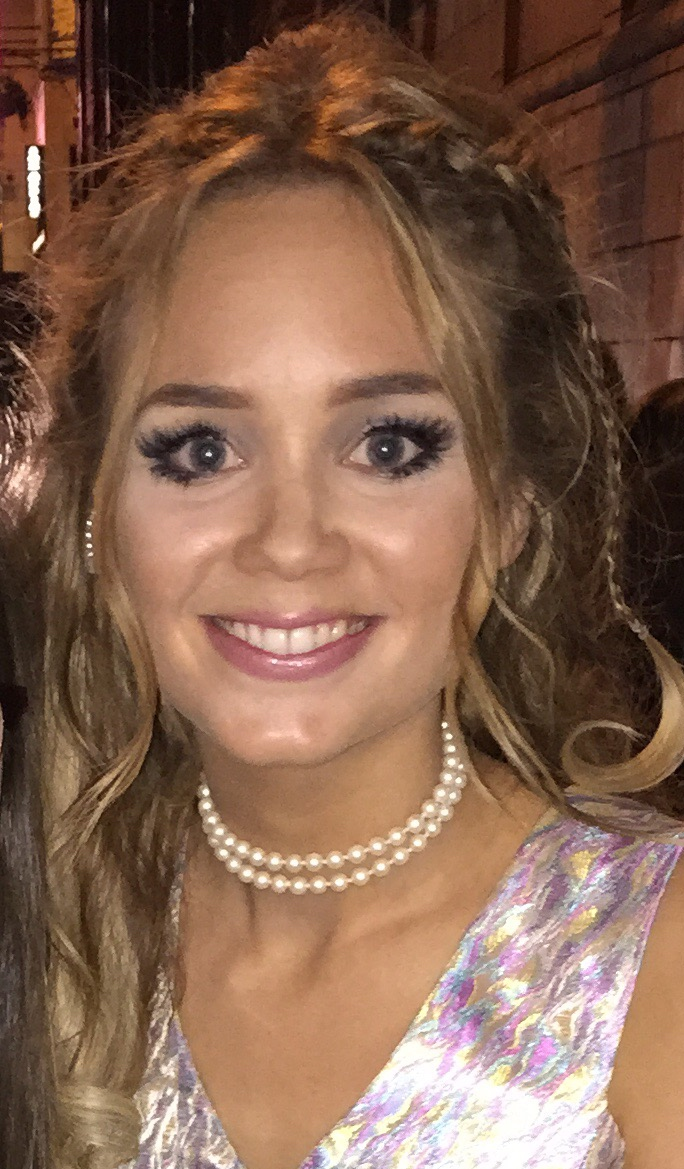
Farrah catches the eye of Esther and Kim, respectively played by Jasmine Franks (right) and Daisy Wood-Davis (left)

Upon Farrah's arrival, Farrah catches Esther's eye, and Pattani revealed that Farrah would be involved in a potential love triangle with Esther and her estranged wife Kim Butterfield (Daisy Wood-Davis). The actress explained that Farrah is single and likes to "play the field". She added that Farrah would cause a lot of drama without intending to, but explained that she is a "well-intentioned character with a lot of integrity". Pattani revealed that she watched her first episode on the soap in the Hollyoaks green room due to being so nervous and struggling to see herself on screen, though she added that people were very supportive. One of Farrah's patients is depressed Scott Drinkwell (Scott Adams), who she supports after he attempts to kill himself. When Farrah finds out that Scott has been hiding his identity from his half-brother Damon Kinsella (Jacob Roberts), she confronts him and encourages him to be honest. Farrah later supports Scott's cousin Lily Drinkwell (Lauren McQueen) with her own health issues.

=== Relationship with Kim ===
After ending her marriage to Kim, Esther remains friendly with her and, encouraging her to get professional help, comes with her to hospital with Farrah, who is her new psychologist. Kim becomes "immediately smitten" with Farrah, which made Daniel Kilkelly from Digital Spy opine that Farrah would be Kim's new "victim to stalk, pester and generally obsess over" due to Kim's history of obsessing over people. Kim and Farrah begin spending more time together at the hospital and Kim takes a "strong shine" to her, although Farrah is unaware of Kim's feelings towards her. When Farrah believes that Kim is ready to be discharged due to her progress, Kim panics and pretends to be in a "trance". A suspicious Yasmine pretends to have chest pains to expose Kim, which works when she immediately goes to help her, ruining Kim's plans. Kim is then honest with Farrah and says that she feels that she will have nothing without Farrah's therapy sessions; Farrah becomes concerned of how attached Kim is becoming and attempts to assign her to a new psychologist. It was teased that whilst the pair could become romantic interests, it could be problematic due to Kim being one of Farrah's patients. Speaking of the storyline, Pattani explained that Farrah likes Kim a lot and wants to pursue her feelings for her, but it is difficult as she was her psychologist and that is how they got to know each other. Pattani believed that Kim and Farrah "match in terms of their quirkiness". The actress noted how Misbah does not think that a relationship with Kim will help Farrah's career. Kirkwood believed that Misbah being worried for her lesbian daughter because of her risking her job rather because she is gay showed progress in LGBTQ+ representation.

=== Kim's disappearance and Ryan danger ===
Farrah notices tension between Sami and Kim, which is due to Kim finding out about Sami's secret vendetta against James Nightingale (Gregory Finnegan). In 2018, after an argument with Farrah, Kim goes missing after she finds out of the secrets of killer Ryan Knight (Duncan James). Farrah becomes "frantic with worry" about Kim's disappearance and reports it to the police, who dismiss her fears and do not investigate it. Going over the past few weeks, Farrah becomes suspicious of the secret that Kim shared with Sami and confronts him as she believes that he knows more than he is saying. Not wanting to reveal his vendetta against James, Sami lies and tells Farrah that Kim was dating someone else behind her back and claims that this was the reason for his arguments with Kim, which stuns Farrah. It is revealed that Ryan has locked Kim in an abandoned room at Hollyoaks High School, which was then sealed by workmen.

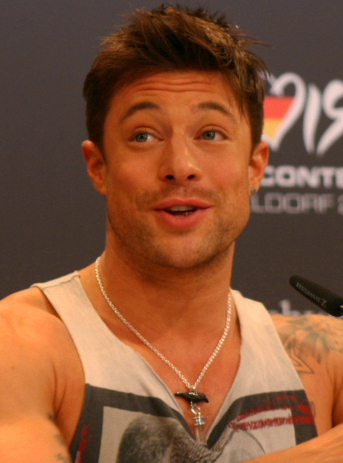
Pattani enjoyed playing with Duncan James (pictured), who plays Ryan

Believing that Kim is gone forever and dealing with a lack of answers over her disappearance, Farrah tries to move on with her life and gives up of ever finding her. Farrah ends up having a breakdown when she packs up a box of Kim's belongings and she is comforted by Grace Black (Tamara Wall). It was hinted that a romance could develop between the pair. Pattani believed the chemistry between Grace and Farrah was very interesting, explaining, "As friends, they get on so well because Farrah is used to being the person in charge. She's used to being the person that's emotionally strong and confident, helping people with their problems. In this situation, Grace is the one helping Farrah when she's lost. I think that's where the connection comes from. For Farrah to meet someone who's so strong for her in this moment of such desperation, it's really interesting to see. It's a really lovely friendship that they're striking up". Kim's absence from Farrah's life meant to Pattani was filming more scenes with other cast members, which the actress liked as it provided "different avenues for the character and different paths for Farrah as a person". Pattani added, "It was nice to have the relationship and the love between [Farrah and Kim]. But now we've also had a chance just to explore Farrah better as a person – her morality, her sense of self and how she reacts as a professional when her back's up against a wall. That's been really interesting to explore. So rather than being strange, it's just been a really golden opportunity".

When Ryan is arrested for his crimes, he promises to tell Farrah where Kim's body is in order to stay out of prison, planning to use Kim as a "bargaining chip". Ryan then ends up taking Farrah to a forest to find Kim's body, nowhere near where she actually is, and it is hinted that Farrah would be serious "deadly danger" because of this. Pattani had been a fan of James' band Blue but felt that her scenes with James were different as he was a "lovely actor". The actress enjoyed filming the scenes and said that she loved how "tense" they were and "how high the stakes" were, and that she was able to "completely give" her "all", which she found very fun. Meanwhile, Kim's health gets even worse as she runs out of food and gets an infection. Ryan eventually tells the police about where Kim really is and the news reaches Farrah. After her ordeal, Kim continues to struggle mentally and Farrah becomes concerned for her welfare and frustrated that she cannot help her.

=== Affair with Grace and WAGs ===
Farrah continues trying to help Kim readapt to life after her ordeal, but she then gets a "life-changing offer" of her dream job outside of the village and she is unsure whether to take due to her "tricky situation" with Kim as she is unsure of how Kim will cope with her being away. Misbah encourages Farrah to accept the job and says that Kim needs to learn to function without her. Farrah ends up talking about her issues with Grace and says that she is unsure if she is truly happy being with Kim. Grace and Farrah are then "overcome by their feelings" and they kiss again. Kim shows a "positive sign of improvement" and tries to congratulate Farrah on the job, but Farrah snaps at her as she is feeling guilty over her kiss with Grace, although she apologises the next day.

When Kim finds out about Farrah's affair, she confronts Grace and gets spotted by Grace's jealous ex-boyfriend, villain Glenn Donovan (Bob Cryer), who wrongly assumes that Kim is Grace's new lover. Kim decides to give Farrah a second chance, but when she is meeting her, Glenn shoots Kim, leaving her fighting for her life. Pattani explained that Farrah is "heartbroken" when Kim is shot and she believes that she is going to lose the "love of her life", and she also blames herself as Kim was innocent and got shot because of Farrah's affair with Grace. Glenn is able to walk free due to a lack of evidence and Farrah worries about Kim's mental state. When Kim recovers and Glenn returns to the doctors, Farrah tries to protect her and risks her career doctoring Kim's medical notes so that she does not find out that Glenn is back in town as Farrah is worried that his return will set Kim back psychologically. However, Glenn is then sent to the hospital after he collapses. As Glenn is awaiting for an operation, Kim tries to murder him, but Farrah manages to talk her down in time.

Wanting to bring Glenn down, Farrah and Kim team up with Grace, Courtney Campbell (Amy Conachan), Maxine Minniver (Nikki Sanderson) and Simone Loveday (Jacqueline Boatswain), with the six ladies forming the "WAGs". It was teased that one or more of the ladies could murder Glenn. Pattani explained that the experience of almost losing Kim by Glenn's violence has left Farrah "raging and vengeful"; she added that Farrah is not capable of murder and does not want the others to murder either, but she is prepared to kill Glenn with help from the others if it means that they will be free from him. Pattani added:

"Farrah isn't emotionally or mentally prepared for the consequences, because it's so far off her usual moral compass. Kim's shooting has brought out a guttural revenge in Farrah, which is new to her. Farrah is able to analyse people's behaviour and mental state, proposing risks to the WAGs. She hasn't been directly involved with Glenn or Liam herself, so can bring some objectivity to the table in their discussions about the two. Farrah also has skills of persuasion, and is able to calm and talk people in or out of things."

Glenn's "reign of terror" finally ends when the WAGs take inspiration from the novel Murder on the Orient Express and all poison Glenn's drink, which triggers a fatal heart attack for him. Glenn's portrayer, Bob Cryer, "loved" the twist of Glenn's death having an "Agatha Christie-esque twist" by having the WAGs team up to kill him, telling Digital Spy, "There was a brilliant team-building nature among the WAGs. Every week, they seemed to get themselves a new member. It was fantastic, bold and funny too, because the story had its lighter moments. Now it's all come together, with a brilliant array of talent involved". Cryer also noted that viewers enjoyed the teaming up of Courtney with the other WAGs and some had asked if they could team up against other villains, with Cryer joking that they could be like Avengers Assemble and do it only for special occasions. Following Glenn's death, Glenn's son Liam Donovan (Jude Monk McGowan) vows revenge on the WAGs as he believes that they are responsible. After Liam finds Kim's missing vial in a bush and she is taken in for questioning, the WAGs worry that they will be found out. However, Kim decides to take the blame for Glenn's murder as she believes that she has less to lose and she flees the village after an "emotional goodbye" with Farrah to avoid being arrested. Kim's departure had already been announced prior.

With Farrah now single and ready to move on, Farrah's bulimic patient Cleo McQueen (Nadine Mulkerrin) tries to matchmake the pair by promising to eat a whole meal in the pub on the condition that Farrah goes out for a drink with Grace. Farrah keeps up her end of the deal when Cleo obliges and she asks Grace out, with it being hinted by Digital Spy that this could lead to a new relationship for the pair. Additionally, it is revealed that the WAGs did not actually go through with poisoning Glenn, and it was in fact serial killer Breda McQueen (Moya Brady) who murdered him.

=== Departure ===
In May 2019, it was hinted that Farrah would be departing the village when she receives a job offer in Canada, leaving her torn over what to do and how to tell Grace. Farrah decides to keep the news to herself and is further unsure when Grace says that she wants to move but stay in Chester. When Grace announces that she plans to get a matching tattoo with Farrah, the latter feels "Backed into a corner" and opens up about her potential move to Canada. Grace is then run over by her brother Liam and Mercedes McQueen (Jennifer Metcalfe), which leaves her worried that she will never be able to walk again. After the accident, Farrah wants to stay by Grace's side and plans on helping her becoming paralysed. Liam tries to cover-up that he ran Grace over, but when he sees Grace he has a panic attack and blurts out that he cannot get the sound of the brakes from the car crash out his head, which makes Farrah suspicious.

Farrah ended up departing the soap and her exit aired on 28 May 2019. In her exit storyline, Farrah tries to get inside of Liam's head and offers him an impromptu therapy session, but Liam realises what she is up to and makes up a storyline about witnessing a car crash when he was younger. Wanting to get rid of Farrah, Liam manipulates Grace into breaking up with by telling her that Farrah still has not cancelled her flight to Canada and that it would be best to let her go, and so Grace pretends that she does not love Farrah as she feels that she is holding her back. The pair break up and Farrah is encouraged by her family to have a fresh start, so she leaves the village and says goodbye to them. Farrah then calls the police and tells them that she believes that Liam is hiding something about the crash.

Speaking about her decision to leave the soap, Pattani revealed that it was a mutual decision between her and Hollyoaks executive producer Bryan Kirkwood. Pattani said that her time was "sort of coming to an end anyway" and that whilst she had had "an amazing time on this show and have learned so much from amazing people", she wanted to pursue other projects. Pattani believed that it was "heartbreaking" that Farrah and Grace could not be together, though she was glad that Farrah got a great work opportunity. Pattani added, "It's so sad; [Garace and Farrah have] been through a lot and really care for each other. They are a bit of an odd couple, but what I enjoyed about playing their relationship was how they work out understanding each other. It was quite funny to see". Pattani also said, "Grace felt she had to do what she did for Farrah to move on, otherwise there'd be no reason she would've left".

Pattani was glad that Farrah had reported Liam to the police, saying, "Liam thinks he's untouchable and can get away with anything. Farrah had a sense something wasn't right and questioned him to get to the bottom of it, but before she could get anywhere he shut her down and engineered it to get rid of her. I'm so glad she follows her instinct and reports him to the police; she trusts they will do something". Pattani explained that Farrah only thinks that Liam knows something and if she knew that he had driven the car that hit Grace she would have been more confrontational, adding, "Accusing her girlfriend's brother of having some knowledge about this terrible accident is a massive thing that could wreck her relationship, and she hasn't got any evidence, just an inkling. That isn't enough to convince other people." Pattani noted that Liam had gone to "great lengths" to hide something from Farrah. Pattani added that Farrah thinks that Grace has other people in her life who she can turn to now that she has left.

A storyline had also seen the Maalik family be targeted by a far-right gang. Pattani praised Hollyoaks for tackling that topic, explaining, "This is such a toxic presence in our society, a lot of our audience are young people so it's good to tell the story to them. Covering racism is extremely dark, but I'm glad they are doing it as it is a real problem. I am proud of Hollyoaks and glad I got to be a part of it". She added that she would continue watching the soap to see how the storyline progressed. The actress said that she would be miss working with her Maalik family co-stars, calling them "gorgeous people" who are passionate about their work but also fun to be around. Pattani said that she loved working with them and that they had laughed a lot on set. She added that she was very proud of what Hollyoaks was doing with the Maalik family and what they had achieved. The actress said that she would be open to returning to Hollyoaks if the opportunity came up. Pattani also said that she would be open to being on another soap opera but felt loyal to Hollyoaks.

== Storylines ==
Farrah arrives in Hollyoaks as the new psychiatrist of Dee Valley Hospital. She is revealed to be the sister of Yasmine Maalik (Haiesha Mistry) and the daughter of Misbah Maalik (Harvey Virdi). They are later joined by Farrah's brother Imran Maalik (Ijaz Rana) and their half-brother Sami Maalik (Rishi Nair). Farrah catches the eye of Esther Bloom (Jazmine Franks) and arranges to go on a date with her, but she cancels when she finds out that she is the estranged wife of Farrah's new patient, Kim Butterfield (Daisy Wood-Davis). Farrah supports Scott Drinkwell (Ross Adams) with his depression after he attempts suicide. Kim develops feelings for Farrah, who reciprocates, so Farrah stops being her psychiatrist and the pair develop a relationship, with Kim later moving in with Farrah and her family.

When Kim goes missing after she is kidnapped and locked up in an abandoned building by Ryan Knight (Duncan James), Sami tells Farrah that Kim has left her. However, he later reveals that he lied in order to protect a secret of his that Kim found out. Ryan later tells Farrah that he will tell her where Kim is if he is released, so Farrah works with the police to trick him. The plan goes awry and puts Farrah in danger, but Ryan eventually reveals that he locked Kim in the abandoned Hollyoaks High building and she is saved moments from dying. Kim is traumatised after her ordeal and Farrah struggles to help her, which strains their relationship. Farrah ends up kissing Grace Black (Tamara Wall) twice. Kim forgives Farrah, but she is shot by Grace's ex-boyfriend Glenn Donovan (Bob Cryer) when he incorrectly assumes that she is having an affair with Grace, which devastates Farrah. Farrah feels guilty that her affair put Kim in danger and she works with other women to take down Glenn. After Glenn is poisoned, Kim takes the blame and goes on the run, but she also encourages Farrah and Grace to act on their feelings and become a couple.

Farrah and Grace begin dating. Misbah is initially wearing of Grace but she later accepts the relationship. Farrah supports Lily Drinkwell (Lauren McQueen) with her mental health struggles and self-harm and informs her loved ones that she is in danger due to having sepsis. Farrah is unsure what to do when she received a job offer in Canada. After Grace is run over, Farrah aims to stay with her. Farrah becomes suspicious that Grace's brother Liam Donovan (Jude Monk McGowan) is responsible for the crash. Liam, wanting to get rid of Farrah and protect his secret, manipulates Grace into breaking up with her, so a heartbroken Farrah leaves the village to take the job in Canada. Before leaving, Farrah tells that police that she believes that Liam is hiding something about the crash. Years later, it is revealed that that Farrah has a maternal half-brother Shaq Qureshi (Omar Malik).

== Reception ==
A month after the character's debut, Pattani said that she had received a positive response online, adding, "Everyone's just been really happy to see Farrah there in the show". Laura Heffernan from Inside Soap called Farrah "Girl Next Door". Heffernan later called Farrah flamboyant, "quirky" and the "coolest psychologist in town", noting how she "turns heads wherever she goes". A writer from the same magazine called Farrah a "cool" and "edgy lass" that "certainly" grabbed Tony's attention in her first appearance. Inside Soap also called Farrah "feisty". Daniel Kilkelly from Digital Spy called Farrah's first scene "pretty memorable", commenting that the character "certainly knows how to make an entrance". Kilkelly also speculated that there would be "interesting times" ahead due to Farrah being characterised as blunt. Kilkelly also believed that Farrah should "Watch out" as he feared that she would become Kim's new stalking target. Regarding Farrah's first episode, Di Hollingsworth from What to Watch wrote, "Talk about making an entrance! Farrah Maalik roars into Hollyoaks on a motorbike, kisses a girl, then removes a biker jacket to reveal a pair of heavily tattooed arms." Sophie Dainty from Digital Spy believed that Farrah had a "feisty exterior" and that she had made her debut in a "pretty memorable fashion". She believed that a love triangle between Farrah, Kim and Esther would be "dramatic" and hinted that Farrah should "be careful". Prior to Kim and Farrah starting a relationship, Dainty believed that Kim had "transferred her obsession with Esther onto Farrah" and speculated that Farrah could be in danger due to Kim's obsession. Dainty wondered in June 2018 whether Farrah could lose Kim to Grace after the pair "share a moment".

Stephen Patterson from Metro opined that Farrah and Grace's relationship had been "anything but smooth", adding that they had had a "rocky start" but things got later got better for the pair, though he believed that Farrah's potential move to Canada could "very well spell the end for their relationship". Duncan Lindsay from the same newspaper opined that Farrah had taken "drastic action" to protect Kim from Glenn by jeopardising her career and doctoring Kim's medical notes. Lindsay also wondered whether Kim and Farrah would split up after the latter's kiss with Grace. Lindsay's colleague Adam Starkey believed that Farrah could be the one to expose Liam for running over Grace. Christian Tobin from Digital Spy called Farrah's departure scenes "sad" and believed that the scenes where Grace breaks up with Farrah were "heartbreaking". Tobin reported how viewers were "wrecked" by the couple's breakup, which he believed was not surprising, and he wondered whether Farrah had "set the wheels in motion for Liam's downfall". Johnathon Hughes from Radio Times believed that the way that Grace broke up with Farrah was cruel. Jessica Lindsay from Metro wrote that despite sometimes showing her sensitive side, Farrah was "certainly a contender for one of the feistiest women in Hollyoaks, which is saying something!" She also called Farrah's departure sad and "tearful" but was glad that she had the "last laugh against Liam". A writer from Soaplife called Farrah a "no-nonsense Tigress" in 2017.
