= Ijaz Rana =

Pakistani-British actor (born 2001)

- Born: Ijaz Nasir Rana; 15 April 2001 (age 24); Pakistan
- Occupation: Actor
- Years active: 2017–present

Ijaz Nasir Rana (born 15 April 2001) is a Pakistani-British actor. He is known for portraying the role of Imran Maalik in the Channel 4 soap opera Hollyoaks from 2017 to 2023 and again from 2026. For his role as Imran, he received a nomination for Best Leading Performer at the British Soap Awards.

== Life and career ==
Ijaz Nasir Rana was born on 15 April 2001 in Pakistan. He moved to England at the age of eight and began taking acting lessons with TV Workshop Salford. In April 2017, Rana joined the cast of the Channel 4 soap opera Hollyoaks. His character, Imran Maalik, was introduced as the brother of established characters Yasmine (Haiesha Mistry) and Farrah Maalik (Krupa Pattani) and son of Misbah Maalik (Harvey Virdi). His storylines included the physical and emotional abuse of his mother and suffering from an eating disorder. For his portrayal of Imran, he was longlisted for the award of Best Leading Performer at the 2023 British Soap Awards. He initially departed the role in July 2023 when the character left to pursue a job opportunity. In March 2026, it was announced that Rana would be reprising the role of Imran after three years away, with his character returning alongside Leah Barnes (Charlotte Riley). Also in 2026, he is set to appear in the film Apnas.

== Filmography ==
| Year | Title | Role | Notes | Ref. |
|---|---|---|---|---|
| 2017–2023, 2026 | Hollyoaks | Imran Maalik | Regular role | |
| 2026 | Apnas | Yasir Abbas | Film | |

== Awards and nominations ==
| Year | Award | Category | Work | Result | Ref. |
|---|---|---|---|---|---|
| 2023 | British Soap Awards | Best Leading Performer | Hollyoaks | Longlisted | |
