= List of Hollyoaks characters introduced in 2017 =

Hollyoaks is a British television soap opera that was first broadcast on 23 October 1995. The following is a list of characters that appeared or will appear in the serial in 2017, by order of first appearance. All characters were introduced by executive producer, Bryan Kirkwood. The first character to be introduced was Lily Drinkwell (Lauren McQueen), the niece of Diane Hutchinson (Alex Fletcher). Shane Sweeney (Lanre Malaolu/Michael Salami), the father of Prince McQueen (Malique Thompson-Dwyer) and Hunter McQueen (Theo Graham), was also introduced in January, while Darcy Wilde (Aisling Jarrett-Gavin), the former fiancée of Adam Donovan (Jimmy Essex), and Lynette Drinkwell (Amy Robbins), the adoptive mother of Scott Drinkwell (Ross Adams) and sister of Diane, were introduced in March. Four characters were introduced in April: Yasmine Maalik (Haiesha Mistry), a new teenage character who befriended Peri Lomax (Ruby O'Donnell); Toby Wilde (Lucas Haywood), the secret son of Darcy and Adam; Kyle Kelly (Adam Rickitt), the former boyfriend of Nancy Osborne (Jessica Fox); and Maggie Kinsella (Michelle Holmes), Scott's biological mother. Yasmine's mother, Misbah Maalik (Harvey Virdi), debuted in May. Yasmine's sister, Farrah Maalik (Krupa Pattini), and Milo Entwistle (Nathan Morris) were introduced in June. Granny Campbell (Jenny Lee), Damon Kinsella (Jacob Roberts) and Brody Hudson (Adam Woodward) made their first appearances in July. Glenn Donovan (Neil Roberts) made his debut the following month, while September saw the arrivals of Imran Maalik (Ijaz Rana) and Sami Maalik (Rishi Nair).

== Lily Drinkwell ==
Lily McQueen (also Drinkwell), played by Lauren McQueen, made her first appearance on 6 January 2017. The character was announced on 12 December 2016, with further details including McQueen's casting announced on 22 December. Of securing the role, McQueen told Laura Morgan of All About Soap that she met with executive producer Bryan Kirkwood in June 2016 and took part in a reading with one of the cast members. Later that day, her agent rang her to say that she had been offered the role of Lily. She added, "It's brilliant because I live about 15 minutes away from the set. It's the perfect job for me, really."

== Shane Sweeney ==
Shane Sweeney
- Hollyoaks character
- Portrayed by: Lanre Malaolu (2017); Michael Salami (2017–2018)
- Duration: 2017–2018
- First appearance: 30 January 2017
- Last appearance: 30 March 2018
- Introduced by: Bryan Kirkwood
In-universe information
- Occupation: Career criminal
- Sons: Prince McQueen; Hunter McQueen
- Grandsons: Theo Anderson

Shane Sweeney, played by Lanre Malaolu, made his first appearance on 30 January 2017. The character and casting was announced on 9 January 2017. Shane is Prince (Malique Thompson-Dwyer) and Hunter McQueen's (Theo Graham) father, as well as Goldie McQueen's (Chelsee Healey) former partner. Shane comes to the village after being released from jail, and wants to reconcile with Goldie. Malaolu described Shane as a "wheeler-dealer" and "driven by money". He also said that Shane only "loves his family when it suits him." Prince and Hunter will be divided upon their father's return, with Prince welcoming him back, whereas Hunter is more wary and thinks that Shane is potentially scamming the family. Following a decision from Hollyoaks bosses, Shane was promoted to a regular character, but as Malaolu was unavailable, the role was recast to Michael Salami. Salami made his first appearance in the role on 9 May 2017. It was confirmed on 29 March 2018 that Salami would be departing the series, with his final scenes airing in the following day's episode.

Shane revealed to Joel Dexter (Rory Douglas-Speed) that he knew about the drugs which Joel supplied to his aunt, Katy. After blackmailing Joel for a few weeks, Warren Fox (Jamie Lomas) became suspicious of Shane. Later, Shane and Sienna Blake (Anna Passey) faked a kidnapping in an attempt to hurt Warren. After the plan backfired, Shane fled Hollyoaks, once again leaving Goldie, Prince and Hunter behind. Shane held Joel and Cleo McQueen (Nadine Mulkerrin) hostage at a beach. Darren Osborne (Ashley Taylor Dawson) came to the rescue and Joel and Shane had a fight, with the two warring men falling down a sand dune. Joel survived, but Shane went missing, presumed dead. It is later revealed that Shane had a gun in September, after it was unearthed on the beach by Kathy Barnes (Sarah Jane Buckley).

In October 2018, Glenn Donovan (Bob Cryer) is murdered by Goldie's mother Breda McQueen (Moya Brady) and tells the police how he was bullied into confessing to two murders he did not commit, he was later released from prison after making a statement, off-screen. In August 2019, it was revealed that Shane is living with Prince and Hunter and he forgave them for turning their back on him after he told them how he was framed and coerced by Adam and Glenn into admitting two murders he didn't commit

== Carmina McQueen ==
Carmina McQueen
- Hollyoaks character
- Portrayed by: Harlow Jones
- Duration: 2017–2019
- First appearance: Episode 4583; 15 February 2017
- Last appearance: Episode 5133; 27 March 2019
- Introduced by: Bryan Kirkwood
In-universe information
- Family: McQueen
- Father: Diego Salvador Martinez Hernandez De La Cruz
- Mother: Myra McQueen
- Half-brothers: Niall Rafferty; John Paul McQueen
- Half-sisters: Jacqui McQueen; Mercedes McQueen; Tina Reilly; Carmel McQueen; Michaela McQueen
- Grandmothers: Juanita De La Cruz; Marlena McQueen
- Aunts: Kathleen McQueen; Reenie McQueen
- Nephews: Max McQueen; Bobby Costello; Matthew McQueen; Gabriel McQueen
- Nieces: Phoebe McQueen (adoptive)
- First cousins: Theresa McQueen; Porsche McQueen; Celine McQueen; Cleo McQueen
- Other relatives: Breda McQueen; Sylver McQueen; Cher McQueen; Goldie McQueen; Prince McQueen; Hunter McQueen

Carmina Celeste McQueen, portrayed by Harlow Jones, is the daughter of Myra McQueen (Nicole Barber-Lane) and Diego Salvador Martinez Hernandez De La Cruz (Juan Pablo Yepez). She is born on-screen in episode 4583, originally broadcast on 15 February 2017. The character departed on 27 March 2019 to tie in with Myra's exit from the serial.

Myra names her Carmina Celeste in memory of her deceased half-sisters Carmel McQueen (Gemma Merna) and Tina Reilly (Leah Hackett) and cousin Celine McQueen (Sarah George). Following her parents' separation, Sally St. Claire (Annie Wallace) agrees to co-parent Carmina with Myra, but Myra's daughter, Mercedes McQueen (Jennifer Metcalfe), intervenes and reunites Myra and Diego.

== Darcy Wilde ==
Darcy Wilde (also credited as Darcy Osborne and Rebecca), played by Aisling Jarrett-Gavin, made her first appearance on 13 March 2017. The character was first mentioned on-screen in November 2016, while Jarrett-Gavin's casting was announced on 3 January 2017. Darcy is Adam Donovan's (Jimmy Essex) ex-fiancée and was presumed dead after she vanished from a boat trip to France. Ahead of her arrival in the village, Adam learns that his brother Liam (Maxim Baldry) "is harbouring a huge secret about her." His other brother Jesse (Luke Jerdy) was infatuated with her, while their mother Tracey Donovan (Lisa Maxwell) and half-sister Grace Black (Tamara Wall) are also hiding a secret about Darcy.

== Lynette Drinkwell ==
Lynette Drinkwell
- Hollyoaks character
- Portrayed by: Amy Robbins
- First appearance: 22 March 2017
- Last appearance: 11 April 2017
- Introduced by: Bryan Kirkwood
In-universe information
- Sisters: Diane O'Connor; Babs Drinkwell
- Adoptive sons: Scott Drinkwell
- Nieces: Lily Drinkwell

Lynette Drinkwell, played by Amy Robbins, made her first appearance on 22 March 2017. The character had been alluded to before, but never seen. Her introduction was reported in the 11–24 March 2017 edition of Soaplife. Robbins' casting was announced on 12 March. Lynette is Scott Drinkwell's (Ross Adams) adoptive mother, and Diane Hutchinson's (Alex Fletcher) sister. Lynette will come to the village to support Scott following John Paul McQueen's (James Sutton) departure, however she will become worried after Scott drinks "one too many". Jack Tomlin of Digital Spy added that Lynette is also in possession of some "life-changing news..." Ross Adams, who plays Scott, said that Lynette "is a larger-than-life character – she's quite brash and feisty, and confident. I think Scott has modelled himself on her a little bit."

Lynette first appears to comfort Scott following the departure of John Paul, who Scott held affections for. When Scott accuses Diane of having an affair with his father, Lynette reveals that while married to her, Scott's father had an affair with another woman who is Scott's biological mother. Scott is devastated and disappears so Lynette decides to return home. As she prepares to leave, Scott returns and explains that he is not upset as Lynette will always be his "real mother". A few weeks later, Scott meets with Lynette to find out more information about his adoption and she gives him a letter from his biological mother. Scott soon realises that Lynette wrote the letter and he asks her to leave. Before she leaves, Lynette tells him that his biological mother's name is Maggie (Michelle Holmes).

== Yasmine Maalik ==
Yasmine Maalik
- Hollyoaks character
- Portrayed by: Haiesha Mistry
- Duration: 2017–2024
- First appearance: 4 April 2017
- Last appearance: 28 February 2024
- Introduced by: Bryan Kirkwood
In-universe information
- Other names: Yasmine Cunningham
- Occupation: Receptionist
- Father: Kashif Maalik
- Mother: Misbah Maalik
- Brothers: Imran Maalik
- Sisters: Farrah Maalik
- Half-brothers: Sami Maalik; Shaq Qureshi
- Husband: Tom Cunningham (2020–2024)
- Stepdaughters: Steph Cunningham-Lomax
- Aunts: Hasina; Kameela
- First cousins: Dillon Ray

Yasmine Cunningham (also Maalik) is played by Haiesha Mistry. She made her first on-screen appearance on 4 April 2017. The character's introduction was revealed in Soaplife published on 21 March, while Mistry's casting was announced on 24 March 2017. Yasmine is a pupil at Hollyoaks High, who comes into contact with Peri Lomax (Ruby O'Donnell), after she posts messages about Peri's family troubles online. Peri seeks revenge on Yasmine, potentially sparking off a feud. Mistry has described her character as "loud and flamboyant", and that she "swaggers through school acting like the coolest of the cool kids – but it's all just bravado."

Mistry left Hollyoaks on 28 February 2024 in a storyline that saw Yasmine move to Canada for a job opportunity.

Yasmine first appears when she introduces herself to Peri and asks about her father, Cameron Campbell (Cameron Moore), who is a serial killer. Peri confides in Yasmine but she uses the information to publish an article on a school blog, leaving Peri upset. Peri summons Yasmine to the headteacher's office under false pretence and explains that she has read her information from her previous school and will publish it if Yasmine does not delete the article about her father. Yasmine does this and calls a truce with Peri. A fight between Peri and Yasmine breaks out after Peri breaks into Yasmine's locker and steals her earrings, but Neeta Kaur (Amrit Maghera) breaks it up.

Yasmine and Peri calls truce and they became friends. Yasmine gets involved into a car crash with her family when their car collided with Tony Hutchinson (Nick Pickard) and his family. Yasmine and her brother, Imran (Ijaz Rana), struggle to get out of the car, as it has seconds to explode. Their mother Misbah (Harvey Virdi) chooses to help Yasmine out, leaving Imran to get out alone. The car explodes and Yasmine and her family thought Imran was killed in the explosion. But Imran, however, manage to escape before the car exploded. Since the incident, Imran began to abuse Yasmine and Misbah.

When Lily Drinkwell (Lauren McQueen) arrives to the village, Yasmine and Peri began to bully her and made fun of her wearing casual clothing at the school dance. Yasmine slept with Lily's boyfriend Prince McQueen (Malique Thompson-Dwyer) and Lily walks in on them. Yasmine later dates Alfie Nightingale (Richard Linnell), but they broke up after Alfie left the village. Yasmine was devastated when she learned that Lily dies. Yasmine and her family are target and harass by Ste Hay (Kieron Richardson, who blames Misbah for his sister, Tegan Lomax's (Jessica Ellis) death. Yasmine and her family gets trapped into a racism incident, by Ste and the Far Right Group, led by Stuart Sumner (Chris Simmons) and Jonny Baxter (Ray Quinn).

The Maaliks have been harassed for months by Ste and the Far Right Group, and during her brother, Sami's (Rishi Nair) engagement party with Sinead Shelby (Stephanie Davis), Yasmine is involved in an explosion at her home, leaving her deaf, using a voice app on her phone to talk to others. Yasmine and her family moves into Peri's house when her mother, Leela Lomax (Kirsty-Leigh Porter), offers them to stay. Weeks later, Yasmine and her family moves back to their home and Stuart tells them that they are no longer harassing them anymore. Yasmine later befriends Sinead's brother, Finn O'Connor (Keith Rice), who a convicted rapist, who recently got out of prison after serving his time.

Yasmine tells Imran about Finn and Imran accepts her to hang out with Finn. Yasmine and Sami's brother Azim Desai (Nav Sidhu) organises Sami and Sinead's wedding and Finn learn that's Sinead isn't inviting him to her wedding. Yasmine tells him to respect Sinead's decision and Finn thanks her by touching her arm, which she freaked out and ran off. Finn apologises and Yasmine forgives him, agreeing to be his friend. When Sami learns about Yasmine and Finn's friendship from Edward Hutchinson (Joe McGann), he catches them embracing and tells Finn to stay away from Yasmine. Yasmine tells Sami that Finn is her friend and wants him to be her plus one to the wedding, which Sami refuses and Yasmine threats not to go to the wedding, if Finn isn't allowed.

On the day of the wedding, Sami begs Yasmine to be there for him, as Misbah and their sister, Farrah isn't coming to the wedding and Yasmine changes her mind. After seeing Yasmine talking about Finn to his mother Sheeba Desai, Sami allows Yasmine to take Finn as her plus one to the wedding and Yasmine escorts Finn to the ceremony, but only to learn from Sami that Sinead isn't coming to the wedding, and she, along with their family comforts Sami. Yasmine helps Finn get a job and he was hired a job to deliver Christmas trees. But after his first day, Yasmine learns that he got fired. Yasmine learn that Edward is planning to get rid of Finn and forming an alliance with Sally St. Claire (Annie Wallace)

Yasmine warns Finn about Edward's plans, but Finn refuses to believe her. Yasmine tries to tell Finn's mother, Diane, but Finn tells her to stay out of it. Yasmine watches as Finn makes an apology speech to the people of the village during Marnie Nightingale's patisserie grand-opening, which was a fail, and Yasmine runs after an embarrassed Finn. When Finn decided to leave the village, as no one will give him a second chance, Yasmine tells him not to go, as she has feelings for him and they share a kiss.

Finn tells her that it's hard for him if they start a relationship together. Yasmine tells Finn that she's been researching about Edward and shows Finn an old article about Edward getting arrested for murdering his wife. Yasmine and Finn continues searching about Edward's past and shows Diane about Edward's past, who angrily tells them to back off. Edward gives Yasmine a memory stick of an old article about Finn raping his former teacher, John Paul McQueen (James Sutton) and was horrified. After some advice from Sami and Imran, Yasmine goes to see Finn, but only to see him, leaving the village.

On Christmas, Peri and Romeo Quinn (Owen Warner) sets Yasmine up on a date with Tom Cunningham (Ellis Hollins) and they share a kiss and became close.

== Toby Wilde ==
Toby Wilde
- Hollyoaks character
- Portrayed by: Lucas Haywood
- Duration: 2017–2018
- First appearance: 6 April 2017
- Last appearance: 26 April 2018
- Introduced by: Bryan Kirkwood
In-universe information
- Father: Glenn Donovan
- Mother: Darcy Wilde
- Stepfather: Jack Osborne
- Half-brothers: Adam Donovan; Jesse Donovan; Liam Donovan
- Nieces: Iona Campbell

Toby Wilde, played by Lucas Haywood, made his first appearance on 6 April 2017. The character was announced on 31 March 2017, and the casting details were revealed on 5 April 2017. Toby is introduced as the son of Adam Donovan (Jimmy Essex) and Darcy Wilde (Aisling Jarrett-Gavin). Darcy brings Toby to the village after Adam decides to choose a relationship with Maxine Minniver (Nikki Sanderson) over a relationship with her, making him question his judgement.

Darcy and Adam are reunited many years after Adam had believed Darcy had drowned while they were on holiday in France. Adam is happy Darcy is alive, but decides to stay with fiancée, Maxine. Darcy drops a bombshell when she reveals that she gave birth to Adam's son. Toby meets Adam and the two of them instantly bond. After Darcy puts him up to it, Toby lies about Maxine hitting him. Maxine swears that she didn't, but Adam has doubts and Maxine leaves the village. Maxine later returns when she is cleared of hitting Toby. Darcy and Toby make many attempts to sabotage Adam and Maxine's imminent wedding, with Toby scribbling over Maxine's wedding dress and Darcy stripping off at Adam's stag do. However, none of it works and the pair end up marrying.

Toby is rushed to hospital following breathing difficulties. Darcy's former partner, Marcus (Dean Ashton), arrives and claims to be Toby's father. Marcus threatens to take Toby to a different hospital unless Darcy pays him £40,000, the same amount of money she stole from him. Adam pays Marcus the money and he leaves.

It is revealed that Toby is not Adam's son during a confrontation between Darcy and Adam's mother, Tracey Donovan (Lisa Maxwell). When Tracey threatens to tell Adam the truth, the two women struggle and Tracey falls off the boat and drowns. Toby's biological father is revealed to be Adam's father, Glenn (Neil Roberts/Bob Cryer). When Adam finds out the truth, he dumps Darcy, but tells Toby he will always be his father. Darcy moves into the Osborne home and becomes involved with Jack Osborne (Jimmy McKenna). Toby takes to Jack immediately and he is happy when Jack and Darcy get married. Darcy decides to flee the village after all her schemes and manipulations are exposed. Toby leaves the village with his mother.

== Kyle Kelly ==
Kyle Kelly
- Hollyoaks character
- Portrayed by: Adam Rickitt
- Duration: 2017–2020
- First appearance: 10 April 2017
- Last appearance: 9 June 2020
- Introduced by: Bryan Kirkwood
- Spin-off appearances: Hollyoaks Later (2020)
In-universe information
- Occupation: Drug dealer; Barman; Waiter; Prostitute
- Father: Mark Kelly
- Mother: Carole Kelly

Kyle Kelly, played by Adam Rickitt, made his first on screen appearance on 10 April 2017. Rickitt's best known television work was playing Nick Tilsley on Coronation Street. Rickitt's casting and character details were announced on 20 March 2017. Kyle is established as an ex-boyfriend of Nancy Osborne (Jessica Fox) and it was also reported that Kyle could have other connections in the village. Of his decision to join the show, Rickitt said "The key interest for me was in the storylines lined up for Kyle. I think they are amazing, taking the character on a real journey and something I am really enjoying playing a part in. Fingers crossed the audience like the surprises as they keep coming." On 2 June 2020, it was announced Kyle would depart the show and his character would be killed-off in a suicide storyline. He made his final appearance on 9 June 2020.

Kyle runs into his ex-girlfriend, Nancy, at a support group for people with multiple sclerosis, which they both suffer from. Kyle and Nancy reconnect and he helps her cope with her diagnosis. Kyle is a drug dealer and he asks Nancy to hide some marijuana for him. Nancy's husband, Darren Osborne (Ashley Taylor Dawson), sells the drugs himself, but feels guilty and invites Kyle to move in.

It emerges that Kyle had sex with Ryan Knight (Duncan James) the night Ryan's wife, Amy Barnes (Ashley Slanina-Davies), was murdered. Kyle wants to be with Ryan, but Ryan does not want to be with him. Kyle threatens to tell Ryan's girlfriend, Mercedes McQueen (Jennifer Metcalfe), about them so Ryan has him arrested for drug dealing, but Kyle tells Mercedes anyway.

A few months later, Kyle is released from prison and shows up on Ryan's doorstep. Kyle begs Ryan to give them a chance, but he vehemently refuses. A while later, Kyle runs into James Nightingale (Gregory Finnegan) and they sleep together. Kyle is paid by Sami Maalik (Rishi Nair) to get James to fall in love with him. Kyle desperately needs the money to get stem cell treatment in Mexico. When Kyle finds out about Ryan's relationship with Ste Hay (Kieron Richardson), he spitefully tells Ryan's uncle, D.S. Geoff Thorpe (James Bradshaw), about their affair, which later results in Geoff being murdered by Ryan.

Sami reveals that the ultimate plan is for Kyle to fake his death and frame James for his murder. Kyle is reluctant to go through with it since he and James have developed real feelings for each other. Kyle soon grows tired of James' neglectfulness and tells Sami he will go ahead with the plan. Kyle drugs James and stages it so it appears James hit him in order to create a motive for his "murder." Kyle feels guilty when he sees how distressed James is and it actually makes the two of them grow closer. Sami stages the murder scene, but then Kyle has an MS attack and has to be taken to hospital. After James tells Kyle he loves him, Kyle decides he wants to be with James and tells Sami that he will no longer take part in the plan. Sami manipulates Kyle into believing that James is having an affair with Harry Thompson (Parry Glasspool), which results in a nasty fight where Kyle accidentally knocks James unconscious. Sami pressures Kyle into faking his death and Kyle leaves town. James is later charged with his murder. Kyle returns to town after he was unable to get his MS treatment and reveals everything Sami has done. Kyle wants a second chance with James, but he rejects him.

Kyle moves in with Nancy again. Kyle supports Nancy when she is going through a difficult split with Darren. Soon, Kyle and Nancy's old feelings for each other return and they sleep together. At first, both of them are enthusiastic about becoming a couple again, but then Kyle worries he might hurt Nancy and suggests they should just be friends. After some thought, Kyle decides he does want to be with Nancy and they officially become a couple. After orchestrating the perfect day with Nancy, Charlie and Oscar, Kyle dies by suicide in The Hutch restaurant after losing his ongoing battle to depression. Darren later that night finds Kyle's body and, accompanied by a police officer, breaks the news to Nancy.

== Maggie Kinsella ==
Maggie Kinsella
- Hollyoaks character
- Portrayed by: Michelle Holmes
- Duration: 2017–2018
- First appearance: 12 April 2017
- Last appearance: 26 January 2018; 19 April 2018 (voiceover)
- Introduced by: Bryan Kirkwood
In-universe information
- Other names: Greta
- Husband: Buster Smith (backstory)
- Sons: Scott Drinkwell; Damon Kinsella

Maggie Kinsella (initially credited as Greta), played by Michelle Holmes, made her first on-screen appearance on 12 April 2017. The character and casting was announced on 2 April 2017. Scott Drinkwell (Ross Adams) meets Greta when he shows up at the house where his biological mother used to live. Kilkelly (Digital Spy) teased that what Greta tells Scott may or may not help him. Maggie departed the series on 26 January 2018 when she dies following a battle with terminal cancer. On her departure, Holmes commented, "I've had so much fun since March 2017 playing Maggie Kinsella alongside my good friends Ross Adams, Jacob Roberts and Adam Woodward! We have laughed and cried together through it all. A great cast and crew and a wonderful place to work!"

It later emerges that Greta is actually Scott's biological mother, Maggie. Maggie tells Scott that he is better off without her, resulting in Scott trashing her house and Mercedes sabotaging the record player, which later results in a fire. Scott is charged for the fire, but the charges are later dropped. Scott thanks Maggie for dropping the charges, but Maggie angrily tells him that it would be easier if he is locked up and also tells him that she wants nothing to do with him. Scott tells Maggie to meet him again, but when she turns up to meet him, she tells him again to back off. After Damon Kinsella (Jacob Roberts) and Scott see Maggie hugging Damon's best friend, Brody Hudson (Adam Woodward), they immediately believe that they are in a relationship so Damon confronts Brody. Maggie reveals that she has terminal cancer and apologises to Scott for abandoning him for many years; he accepts her apology when she reveals that she became pregnant with him while working as a prostitute.

Maggie later pleads with Scott to help her die. Although reluctant, Scott agrees to help her die. Later, Scott, Damon and Brody help Maggie complete her bucket list, but Maggie is hospitalised with pneumonia. Scott attempts to help Maggie die by giving her the pills she has been hiding, but Damon walks in and stops it from happening. Maggie is released from hospital and she happily watches Scott, Damon and Brody sing and dance outside in the village. When Damon tries waking Maggie from a sleep, he realises that she has died. It turns out that Brody was groomed and sexually abused as a child by Damon's father, Buster Smith (Nathan Sussex). When Maggie found about the sexual abuse, she banished Buster for good and warned him to never come back. All of Brody's life, Maggie has been protecting Brody vowing that she can always keep him safe so then she can stop bad things from happening to him. Damon never knew any of this and Brody and Maggie agreed that they would never tell him as they didn't want Damon to know just how evil that Damon's father really was.

== Misbah Maalik ==
Misbah Maalik
- Hollyoaks character
- Portrayed by: Harvey Virdi
- Duration: 2017–present
- First appearance: 23 May 2017
- Introduced by: Bryan Kirkwood
- Crossover appearances: Brookside (2025)
In-universe information
- Other names: Misbah Rizwaan
- Occupation: Consultant in emergency medicine
- Sisters: Hasina; Kameela
- Husband: Kashif Maalik (backstory); Zain Rizwaan (2022–2027)
- Sons: Shaq Qureshi; Imran Maalik
- Daughters: Yasmine Maalik; Farrah Maalik
- Stepsons: Sami Maalik
- Nephews: Dillon Ray

Misbah Rizwaan (also Maalik), played by Harvey Virdi, made her first on screen appearance on 23 May 2017. She was the longest-serving Maalik family character in the soap. The character and casting was announced on 18 April 2017. Misbah was the mother of Yasmine (Haiesha Mistry) and Farrah Maalik (Krupa Pattani), and is a consultant in emergency medicine at Dee Valley Hospital. Misbah has been billed as "the clumsiest person you'll ever meet – but that doesn't mean she isn't every inch the professional." On her casting, Virdi said "I'm really excited to be joining Hollyoaks and working with such a talented cast and crew. Misbah is quirky, super-bright and forward-thinking, and she's brought her daughters up to be strong independent women. People might say she's bossy – but I'd say she knows what she wants..." Virdi departed the role on 1 June 2020 when Misbah left the village for a secondment in a hospital in Surrey, however this has been announced to be a temporary exit for the character. Virdi returned to screens on 21 September 2020.

It was announced on 7 December 2017 that Misbah would be involved in an issue-led storyline when her son, Imran Maalik (Ijaz Rana) begins emotionally and physically abusing her. Imran's abuse stems from feeling isolated from his family, mainly due to Yasmine's heart condition. Misbah will struggle to protect herself and her son, while also managing her job and parenting role. The show worked with Family Lives, Sefton Women's and Children's Aid, and The Muslim Council of Great Britain while researching the storyline. A spokesperson for Family Lives expressed her delight at working with the show on the storyline as well as at Hollyoaks for highlighting the issue. Nick Frackleton, the CEO of Sefton Women's and Children's Aid, felt that the show holds a "key role" in addressing these forms of "sensitive" issues and praised them for tackling the plot.

The storyline began in January 2018 when after a car crash, Misbah opts to save Yasmine from the car rather than Imran as a lorry headed towards the car. Imran manages to free himself before the lorry hits although he is left feeling bitter and rejected by his mother. Virdi explained that Misbah intended to rescue Yasmine then return to rescue Imran but did not have enough time. The actress felt that Imran would never be able to understand Misbah's decision. Sean Glynn, who directed the crash sequence, wanted to make the crash seem realistic so asked the driver of the lorry to drive towards the car that Imran and Yasmine were trapped in. He made this decision so that the actors' performance could be enhanced, which Rana felt he did.

After Tegan Lomax (Jessica Ellis) tends to Zack Loveday's (Duayne Boachie) injuries whilst under the influence, Misbah calls a disciplinary meeting and despite Tegan's pleas to keep her job, Misbah sacks her, with immediate effect. After Yasmine puts a load of insects down Lily Drinkwell's (Lauren McQueen) T-shirt, Diane Hutchinson (Alex Fletcher) confronts Yasmine, despite Lily's pleas for her not to do so. Misbah defends Yasmine, until she finds out the truth by Yasmine's facial expression. Misbah disapproves of her oldest daughter, Farrah's relationship with Kim Butterfield (Daisy Wood-Davis) due to Kim being Farrah's former patient, and tells Kim to do the right thing and end things with Farrah, which Kim does. Misbah however later has a change of heart. Misbah would appear in Hollyoaks' 30th anniversary episodes that show the show crossover with Brookside on 22 October 2025.

== Farrah Maalik ==
Farrah Maalik, played by Krupa Pattani, made her first appearance on 6 June 2017. The character and casting was announced on 18 April 2017. Farrah is the sister of Yasmine Maalik (Haiesha Mistry), and the daughter of Misbah Maalik (Harvey Virdi). Farrah is billed as a clinical psychologist with a "feisty, hilarious and roaring personality", who "always makes people gasp with her blunt honesty." On her casting, Pattani said "I can't believe I'm getting to play such a unique and free spirited character like Farrah in such a wonderful family as the Maaliks. I am absolutely thrilled to be joining Hollyoaks."

== Milo Entwistle ==
Milo Entwistle
- Hollyoaks character
- Portrayed by: Nathan Morris
- Duration: 2017–2018
- First appearance: 27 June 2017
- Last appearance: 31 August 2018
- Introduced by: Bryan Kirkwood
In-universe information
- Other names: Simon Jones
- Occupation: Technician
- Brothers: Theo Jones

Milo Entwistle, played by Nathan Morris, made his first appearance on 27 June 2017. The character and Morris' casting details were announced on 20 June 2017. Milo is a potential lodger for the Cunningham family, and is "all smiles and banter". However, it has been confirmed that the character is "hiding both a dark side and a disturbing secret" that may cause the Cunninghams some trouble. Of his casting, Morris said: "I feel very lucky to join the amazing team at Hollyoaks and I hope people react well to Milo. He tries his best to be nice and help others, but often makes matters worse. There are some exciting things in Milo's future and I'm looking forward to seeing what lies ahead." In January 2018, Morris was nominated in the "Best Newcomer" category at the National Television Awards 2018. However, he lost out to Danny Walters, who portrays Keanu Taylor in EastEnders. In 2018, Morris was nominated for "Funniest Male" at the Inside Soap Awards.

Milo first arrives on a hoverboard and nearly runs Cindy Savage (Stephanie Waring) over, before crashing into a pile of bin bags. He and DS Gavin Armstrong (Andrew Hayden-Smith) both get interviewed by Cindy and Dirk Savage (David Kennedy) as their new lodger, with DS Armstrong being the result. Milo freaks Cindy's daughter Holly Cunningham (Amanda Clapham) out when she sees him in her bedroom. Dirk allows Milo to set up his business in the Emporium. Milo attempts to help Cindy win the election, but his attempts backfire. Milo is given a room at the Cunninghams'. Milo reveals a tattoo with a cryptic message, hinting at a dark secret. It is later revealed that Milo is the driver responsible for the car crash that killed Helen Cunningham (Kathryn George) and Gordon Cunningham (Bernard Latham).

Over the next year, Milo goes to great lengths to keep his secret from the Cunningham's. He accidentally caused the deaths of DS Gavin Armstrong (Andrew Hayden-Smith) on Christmas Day 2017, and Dirk on Holly and Damon Kinsella's (Jacob Roberts) wedding in July 2018. Milo departed in the episode broadcast on 31 August 2018, after being transferred to a hospital in Birmingham after surviving a car falling on top of him.

== Granny Campbell ==
Granny Campbell
- Hollyoaks character
- Portrayed by: Jenny Lee
- Duration: 2017–2018
- First appearance: 6 July 2017
- Last appearance: 23 August 2018
- Introduced by: Bryan Kirkwood
In-universe information
- Sons: Tommy Campbell
- Daughters: Fanny Campbell
- Grandsons: Cameron Campbell; Lockie Campbell
- Granddaughters: Courtney Campbell
- Other relatives: Peri Lomax; Iona Campbell

Granny Campbell, played by Jenny Lee, made her first appearance on 6 July 2017. The character's introduction was announced on 25 June, and Lee's casting details were revealed on 27 June 2017. Granny Campbell was originally meant to be played by Janette Tough before the role went to Lee. She has previously been mentioned several times by her on-screen family. Granny Campbell arrives in the village to visit her granddaughter Courtney Campbell (Amy Conachan), which worries Courtney due to her grandmother's controlling behaviour. However, when Granny Campbell does arrive, she is nice, which worries Courtney. Granny Campbell departed the series in February 2018, although Lee later reprised the role for one episode in August.

Granny Campbell discovers that Courtney is pregnant and orders Courtney to move to Scotland with her, much to Courtney's chagrin. Despite originally opting to return with Granny Campbell, Courtney decides to stay in the village. Granny Campbell returns nearly 5 months later, and since then, she has said that Courtney has pre-eclampsia, when in fact she didn't and also held Courtney hostage in her own flat without the use of her wheelchair available. When Courtney is rushed into an ambulance after having a contraction, Granny Campbell bans Jesse Donovan (Luke Jerdy) from going to the hospital to support Courtney.

== Damon Kinsella ==
Damon Kinsella
- Hollyoaks character
- Portrayed by: Jacob Roberts
- Duration: 2017–2023
- First appearance: Episode 4691; 17 July 2017
- Last appearance: Episode 6145; 30 June 2023
- Introduced by: Bryan Kirkwood
In-universe information
- Occupation: Barman
- Father: Buster Smith
- Mother: Maggie Kinsella
- Half-brothers: Scott Drinkwell
- Wife: Maxine Minniver (2019–2020)
- Stepdaughters: Minnie Minniver

Damon Kinsella, played by Jacob Roberts, made his first screen appearance on 17 July 2017. The character and casting was announced on 8 May 2017. Damon is the best friend of Brody Hudson (Adam Woodward). He arrives in the village looking for a girlfriend. Roberts and Woodward are childhood friends and join the cast at similar times. Roberts expressed his excitement at joining the cast and on his casting, said "I really enjoy playing the role of Damon and I am looking forward to the fans discovering who he really is and who he is connected to in the village". In 2018, Roberts and Woodward were nominated for Best Partnership at the Inside Soap Awards.

Scott Drinkwell (Ross Adams) finds his biological mother, Maggie Kinsella (Michelle Holmes), and later finds out about her other son, Damon. When Damon and Scott meet, Scott does not reveal who he is. Damon instantly bonds with Scott and they become close friends. Scott later tells Damon he's his half-brother. Damon feels betrayed by both him and his mother for keeping secrets from him. Damon and his longtime best friend, Brody, help Scott through his mental health struggles and they reconcile. Damon and Brody get jobs as bartenders at The Dog in the Pond public house and move into the flat upstairs. Damon begins dating Holly Cunningham (Amanda Clapham). Damon is devastated to learn his mother has terminal ovarian cancer. Damon, Brody, and Scott help Maggie through her final days and are at her side when she passes away. Damon's estranged father, Buster Smith (Nathan Sussex), arrives in town for Maggie's funeral. Damon is not happy to see his father after all these years but comes around though when he sees that he genuinely wants to be in his life again. When Damon's mate Brody was younger, he was groomed and sexually abused by Damon's father Buster and Damon never knew this apart from Damon's mother Maggie who found about this and threatened Buster to leave the family home for good and to never come back or otherwise, she would have reported him to the police for grooming and sexually abusing Brody. Brody and Maggie agreed to never tell Damon the awful truth about Buster. Holly turns down Damon's proposal and he impulsively sleeps with her mother, Cindy Savage (Stephanie Waring). Holly wants to work things out, but Damon feels too guilty and breaks up with her. Eventually, Damon proposes again and Holly accepts. At the wedding, Damon confesses to sleeping with Cindy, leaving the guests shocked.

On 29 June 2023, it was announced that Roberts had left Hollyoaks. Damon's final scenes aired on 30 June 2023 in a storyline that saw him leave to open a bar which was his and Brody's dream.

== Brody Hudson ==
Brody Hudson
- Hollyoaks character
- Portrayed by: Adam Woodward
- Duration: 2017–2021
- First appearance: Episode 4707; 25 July 2017
- Last appearance: Episode 5679; 16 September 2021
- Introduced by: Bryan Kirkwood
In-universe information
- Occupation: Barman
- Daughters: Faith Hudson-Savage

Brody Hudson, played by Adam Woodward, made his first on screen appearance on 25 July 2017. The character and Woodward's casting details were announced on 7 May 2017. Brody is billed as "quite the ladies' man", while his arrival is described as "some of the sexiest [scenes that] Hollyoaks viewers have seen." Brody arrives during scenes filmed in Ibiza. On his casting, Woodward commented, "I'm so chuffed to be joining the cast of Hollyoaks and filming my first scenes in Ibiza! Brody is a brilliant character to play and I can't wait to see what the fans think of him." It was later confirmed that Brody's first scenes would pay homage to actor Daniel Craig's first scenes as James Bond in Casino Royale. A show spokesperson explained that Woodward spent time working on physical appearance for the scenes. Daniel Kilkelly of Digital Spy reported that Brody's first scenes would "cause a stir among the regular characters". The reporter also revealed that Brody would arrive in the village after holidaying in Ibiza with "a dangerous secret about what happened in Ibiza". In August 2017, Woodward was longlisted for Sexiest Male at the Inside Soap Awards. He did not progress to the viewer-voted shortlist. In 2018, Woodward and Roberts were nominated for Best Partnership at theInside Soap Awards. Then in 2019, he won both Best Male Dramatic Performance at the British Soap Awards and Best Actor at the Inside Soap Awards.

Brody first appears on the beach in Ibiza walking out of the water. Brody later arrives in Hollyoaks and he is revealed to be the long-time best friend of Damon Kinsella (Jacob Roberts). Brody and Damon get jobs as bartenders at The Dog in the Pond public house and move into the flat upstairs. Brody has flirtations with several of the women in the village, particularly with Lisa Loveday (Rachel Adedeji). Brody tries to get close to Lisa, but she continuously pushes him away and he ends up sleeping with her friend, Cleo McQueen (Nadine Mulkerrin). Damon's mother Maggie (Michelle Holmes) confides in Brody that she has terminal cancer and asks him not to tell Damon. When Damon mistakenly believes that Brody and Maggie are having an affair, they tell him the truth. Brody, Damon, and Damon's half-brother, Scott Drinkwell (Ross Adams), support Maggie during her final days and they are all at her side when she passes away. Damon's estranged father, Buster Smith (Nathan Sussex), arrives in Hollyoaks for Maggie's funeral. Brody is not happy to see Buster and it is clear there is bad blood between them. It slowly becomes apparent that Buster had groomed and sexually abused Brody as a child. Buster moves into The Dog flat as well, causing tension with Brody. Brody begins dating Liberty Savage (Jessamy Stoddart), but cheats on her with a stripper at Damon's stag party. Scott is arrested for sexually abusing Oliver Morgan (Aedan Duckworth), but Brody suspects Buster is the actual perpetrator. Brody confronts Buster about abusing him as a child and reveals that Maggie wanted to turn him in before she died. Brody shares his own story of abuse with Oliver and encourages him to turn Buster in, which he does.

In September 2021, a trailer was released on the Hollyoaks social media accounts which showed a scene of Brody being hit by a car. Following the release of the trailer, Digital Spy's Kilkelly confirmed that Woodward would be departing from Hollyoaks and confirmed that he would die in the car accident. After the scenes aired, Woodward revealed to Kilkelly that he had originally planned to leave Hollyoaks in March 2020, until the COVID-19 pandemic occurred. He spoke with Bryan Kirkwood, the executive producer at the time, who offered Woodward another contract for the duration of the pandemic. He was grateful to be given a stable role through the pandemic and acknowledged that it gave the production team more time to write a good exit for Brody. Woodward said that he had always planned to appear on the soap only for a few years, feeling as though he did not want to become too immersed into one character for his entire acting career. He also admitted that he would have liked Brody to stay alive since it meant he could reprise his role if his acting career suffered, but appreciated being able to depart from Hollyoaks "in a blaze of glory".

== Glenn Donovan ==
Glenn Donovan
- Hollyoaks character
- Portrayed by: Neil Roberts (2017); Bob Cryer (2017–2018)
- Duration: 2017–2018
- First appearance: 15 August 2017
- Last appearance: 17 October 2018
- Introduced by: Bryan Kirkwood
In-universe information
- Other names: Darcy's Mystery Man
- Occupation: Businessman; Career criminal
- Father: Pat Donovan
- Wife: Tracey Donovan (backstory)
- Sons: Adam Donovan; Liam Donovan; Jesse Donovan; Toby Wilde
- Stepdaughters: Grace Black; Clare Devine
- Granddaughters: Iona Campbell
- Aunts: Ruth Donovan

Glenn Donovan made his first on-screen appearance on 15 August 2017. Neil Roberts was cast in the role. The character and Roberts' casting details were announced on 8 August 2017. The character becomes involved in a scheme crafted by Darcy Wilde (Aisling Jarrett-Gavin) and saves Darcy when she is harassed by a private investigator hired by Grace Black (Tamara Wall). On 18 September, it was revealed that the character is Glenn Donovan, the former husband of Tracey Donovan (Lisa Maxwell), and father of Adam Donovan (Jimmy Essex), Liam Donovan (Maxim Baldry/Jude Monk McGowan) and Jesse Donovan (Luke Jerdy). On 16 November, it was announced that the role of Glenn had been recast from Roberts to Bob Cryer due to conflicts in Roberts' schedule, and that Roberts' final scenes in the role had already been broadcast that day. Cryer's first appearance as Glenn was broadcast on 7 December 2017. Glenn begins a relationship with Grace, causing conflict with his sons. Grace demands to be involved in Glenn's criminal activities and, after initially allowing her joint partnership, he quickly becomes irritated by her interference and pushes her out. His relationship with Grace is further complicated when he sees her kissing Esther Bloom (Jazmine Franks).

In May 2018, Glenn discovers that someone grassed on his illegal activities to the police. He believes the grass is Zack Loveday (Duayne Boachie) and orders a horrified Adam to kill him. Adam and Glenn take Zack to the woods and Glenn tells Adam to shoot him. Adam leads Zack away from Glenn and allows him to escape. However, Glenn catches Adam about to fire a fake gunshot. Realising Adam was the grass all along, Glenn shoots him. Adam is killed instantly.

Glenn cheats on Grace with Adam's wife, Maxine Minniver (Nikki Sanderson). Grace leaves him and starts seeing Farrah Maalik (Krupa Pattani). Glenn starts to manipulate and control both Maxine and Grace, telling the latter that he knows who her lover is and says he didn't give permission for her to move on. Consumed with jealousy, Glenn shoots Kim Butterfield (Daisy Wood-Davis) believing she is the lover. Glenn dies after his drink was spiked with potassium chloride by Breda McQueen (Moya Brady), who is intent to murder all the "bad dads" in the village. Jesse, Liam, Grace, Maxine, Simone Loveday (Jacqueline Boatswain) and Courtney Campbell (Amy Conachan) watched as he died.

Sarah Ellis from Inside Soap noted most Hollyoaks fans could not "bear the thought of Glenn hanging around much longer", and was glad that Courtney had joined the other women to bring him down.

== Imran Maalik ==
Imran Maalik
- Hollyoaks character
- Portrayed by: Ijaz Rana
- Duration: 2017–2023, 2026–
- First appearance: 25 September 2017
- Introduced by: Bryan Kirkwood
In-universe information
- Father: Kashif Maalik
- Mother: Misbah Maalik
- Sisters: Farrah Maalik; Yasmine Maalik
- Half-brothers: Sami Maalik; Shaq Qureshi
- Aunts: Hasina; Kameela
- First cousins: Dillon Ray

Imran Maalik, played by Ijaz Rana, made his first appearance on 25 September 2017. The character and casting details were announced on 18 September 2017. Of his casting, Rana said, "Joining Hollyoaks has been a pleasure, not only because it's my first on-screen job, but also because joining the Hollyoaks family has been a heartwarming experience!" Imran is the fifth member of the Maalik family to be introduced in 2017. He will join his mother Misbah (Harvey Virdi), sisters Farrah Maalik (Krupa Pattani) and Yasmine (Haiesha Mistry), and half-brother Sami Maalik (Rishi Nair). Imran has been billed as being "a quiet and charming boy", who has a love for photography, which he inherited from his father. He is close to his older sister Yasmine, but often feels like "the forgotten child" due to her heart condition.. On 24 March 2026 it was announced that Rana would reprise his role as imran and would return to Hollyoaks alongside Leah Barnes who will now be played by Charlotte Riley

It was announced on 7 December 2017 that Imran would be involved in an issue-led storyline when he begins emotionally and physically abusing Misbah. Imran's abuse stems from feeling isolated from his family, mainly due to Yasmine's heart condition. Misbah will struggle to protect herself and her son, while also managing her job and parenting role. The show worked with Family Lives, Sefton Women's and Children's Aid, and The Muslim Council of Great Britain while researching the storyline. A spokesperson for Family Lives expressed her delight at working with the show on the storyline as well as at Hollyoaks for highlighting the issue. Nick Frackleton, the CEO of Sefton Women's and Children's Aid, felt that the show holds a "key role" in addressing these forms of "sensitive" issues and praised them for tackling the plot. Rana found the storyline a surprising development for his character as he initially appeared to be "a very gentle and well-mannered character".

The storyline began in January 2018 when after a car crash, Misbah opts to save Yasmine from the car rather than Imran as a lorry headed towards the car. Imran manages to free himself before the lorry hits although he is left feeling bitter and rejected by his mother. Virdi explained that Misbah intended to rescue Yasmine then return to rescue Imran but did not have enough time. The actress felt that Imran would never be able to understand Misbah's decision. In order to create Imran's feeling of neglect, Rana reread every Maalik family scene and noticed that his character was sidelined in every scene; the actor felt that this could enhance his performance. The actor felt that Imran becomes "mentally scarred" by the incident, which leads into the family violence storyline. Sean Glynn, who directed the crash sequence, wanted to make the crash seem realistic so asked the driver of the lorry to drive towards the car that Imran and Yasmine were trapped in. He made this decision so that the actors' performances could be enhanced, which Rana felt he did. On filming the stunt, Rana commented, "The whole experience was very exciting, but tiring towards the end!"

Imran's behaviour starts to become a cause for concern when he sells the family heirloom which was precious to Misbah, and when she figures this out after realising it went missing, she immediately confiscates a bike that Imran bought with the money he made from selling the heirloom, and tells Imran he'd get it back when he paid it off. When Misbah takes in Dirk Savage (David Kennedy) following him becoming homeless, Imran is consumed with jealousy over their bond, and he spooks Dirk into thinking he is dating Misbah to make him stay away. After learning from Sami that James Nightingale (Gregory Finnegan) had framed their father for embezzlement which led to him committing suicide in prison, Imran is quick to blame Misbah for letting the entire family down by doubting her husband, and in a fit of rage, he slaps her across the face, before he begins to feel guilt the following morning about what he did. He apologises repeatedly to Misbah for his actions, but she insists she needs space for the day. In a bid to make amends, Imran calls a family meeting and buys pizza for everyone, before saying that the family is sometimes flawed in their arguments and shouting, but that Misbah is the one holding them together and that she should be admired for it. Eventually, Misbah finds Imran and forgives him, while he explains that he wanted to say how he was in the wrong that morning, and she comforts him.

The following month, Imran learns that his new friend Oliver Morgan's (Aedan Duckworth) father, Luke (Gary Lucy), was raped over 17 years previously, and is forced to tell Oliver about it when he questions Imran about what he heard while he let it slip in the football changing rooms. When Imran and Yasmine decide to get their own back on James for his treatment of the family, it's decided that a party should be held to get to know the Nightingales better, but when James arrives, he seizes the opportunity to insult everybody there, including Imran by calling him creepy, which infuriates him. When the Maaliks get back, another argument unfolds between Misbah and Imran, this time leading to Imran slapping Misbah again and saying that she doesn't deserve to be respected. When headteacher Sally St. Claire (Annie Wallace) approaches Misbah to discuss Imran, it emerges that he has been playing truant, and Misbah becomes suspicious with Imran when he won't hand over his schoolbag. However, several letters intercepted by him fly out, confirming that he has been skipping school. An education welfare officer visits the Maaliks the following day to break the news that Misbah is to be fined for Imran's truancy, which leads her to decide that Imran will be grounded for a week and have his camera confiscated. When he learns this, he flies into a rage with Misbah and smashes plates onto the floor, before attempting to get away from Misbah who tries to drag him back, but ends up having the door swung into her face by Imran, causing a bleed on her eye. The next day, Misbah suffers headaches and loss of vision due to Imran's violence, especially while trying to treat Dee Dee Hutchinson for her autoimmune encephalitis, and she ends up giving Dee Dee a superfluous amount of morphine. On her break, she finds that Imran has skipped school again, and loses her temper with him when he is asked to clean up some milk on the floor. As soon as Misbah reminds him of the damage his outburst has done, he spitefully shouts and screams at Misbah that he skips school so that she can go to prison, and that he behaves violently because of her decision to leave Imran in the car while the lorry headed for him. Misbah eventually tries to arrange counselling for Imran but is caught in the act by him, and while he reminds her of how much she is ruining the family, she collapses from her head injury and Imran is shocked and panicked. Wracked with guilt, Imran decides to turn himself into the police, which Misbah finds out and intercepts, telling him that his birth was so important as she always wanted a boy.

When Imran has an important football match and Misbah promises to come, Yasmine goes into gastric reflux and Misbah therefore can't go because she has to tend to Yasmine, and Imran stays behind waiting for Misbah. Because of this, Imran is made a laughingstock by the team and Imran destroys a piece of Misbah's artwork in anger. She apologises for missing Imran's match, and finds his coach, Buster Smith (Nathan Sussex), to bribe him to keep Imran on the team. When Imran next goes to football practice, he is laughed at again by his teammates and Oliver as they announce that he has been made captain by Buster. Once he gets home, Imran rants at Misbah for being made a laughingstock and hurls a trophy that she brought at the wall. Later, Misbah decides to get tough with Imran about his behaviour, and bans him from video games for a week, but as he begins to protest it, she grounds him and asks for his phone and tablet. After some to-ing and fro-ing, Misbah pulls the plug on his games console, causing him to lose all the data. This sends Imran over the edge and he threatens Misbah with a TV remote. As the tension escalates, Misbah slaps Imran in self-defence. The following morning, Misbah apologises repeatedly for hitting him, but since Imran is still angry at Misbah, he storms out of the house and is caught by Sally riding his bike in the village when she thought he was ill from glandular fever, but she spots the bruise on his face from the slap and is forced to report Misbah to social services. They turn up the next day at the Maaliks, just as Misbah and Imran were planning a getaway for the family to Disneyland. Misbah comes under pressure from the social worker and as soon as Sami gets tough, she admits that she hit Imran, but because of his rebellious behaviour. Sami is furious and disgusted with Misbah for what she did, and warns her that he will be watching her closely.

Imran soon learns that there will be a football trip to Barcelona and announces it to Misbah, but is finited to find out that they can't afford the deposit. Imran winds Misbah up when she catches him using her credit card to pay for the deposit himself, but soon lets him use the card to buy new football boots, but Imran succumbs to peer pressure from Oliver, who convinces him to buy alcohol. Whilst buying the alcohol, they are caught in the act by Simone Loveday (Jacqueline Boatswain) who brings Imran home and tells him off, leading to Misbah having to ground Imran for his safety, but when Imran throws a tantrum about it, Misbah cancels the trip. After finding out that Buster got involved, Imran's anger escalates even more, and he goes as far as throwing a hot cup of tea over Misbah's arm, which is witnessed by a shocked Yasmine just as she walks through the door. Misbah breaks down in front of Yasmine as Imran storms off. The following morning, Misbah's sister Kameela comes to visit, but because of her judgmental attitude, the family try to dodge her questions but Yasmine nearly brings up Imran's violence and the secret of Imran trying to buy alcohol comes out in the process. Kameela is quick to criticise Misbah for being too liberal with her children, and a fight breaks out with Misbah forcing Kameela to leave because of her constant judging. Yasmine tells Imran that she saw the attack, and he runs off. When Yasmine confronts Imran further about his actions, he sees red and pushes her to the ground, leading Yasmine to declare her hatred of Imran, and a heart to heart with Misbah makes her tell Yasmine that Imran has been rebellious and violent ever since the car crash.

Determined to fix her relationship with Imran, Misbah goes to Buster and begs for Imran to be taken to Barcelona, which he goes ahead with. Imran is delighted and hugs Misbah, leaving Yasmine disgusted and jealous with Misbah for rewarding Imran's violent behaviour, and when she confronts Misbah about it, she snaps at Yasmine that she has had more attention than Imran because of her heart condition and that she should be a little more respectful. After a week, Imran returns feeling confident about himself, but when Oliver wants a place on the team again having been kicked off by Buster for buying the alcohol, Buster decides to play Oliver and Imran against each other to determine who gets the final spot. Sadly, Imran suffers a leg injury from a strong tackle that Oliver does, causing him to be on the bench for a while, and for Oliver to be back on the team. Misbah finds Imran in a bad mood at home just as they are about to celebrate Imran's homecoming, and he has a meltdown about his injury and being kicked off the team, which builds up to more anger, and he throws a football boot at a china lamp, breaking it. Weeks later, Imran gets to know autistic girl Brooke Hathaway (Tylan Grant), who Oliver takes a liking to as well, leading both boys to ask her out on a date and for her to accept both. Imran takes a bunch of flowers for Brooke, and she chooses Imran to see. However, Imran sees that Brooke hasn't responded to his messages, and Misbah tries to reassure him. However Oliver appears and begins to joke about Imran's misery over Brooke, winding him up to such an extent that he punches Oliver in the face, right in front of a shocked Misbah.

Some time later, Imran and Brooke go on a couple of dates, but the latter one happens to be a disaster when Brooke suffers a sensory overload from the smell of Imran's aftershave. This leads Brooke to run away and in the process, cut her head open. Misbah sees the cut on Brooke's head and immediately jumps to conclusions that Imran was responsible. Imran is so infuriated by his mother thinking this that he lashes out at Misbah again, this time twisting her arm into a Chinese-burn sensation and saying she deserves it. Misbah eventually decides to go to a doctor about her ordeal, but ends up covering for him again by saying that he is skipping school. She is prescribed some anti-anxiety pills. Yasmine sees that Misbah is acting strangely, and she finds out that Imran is still hitting Misbah, so she becomes determined to sort it out. She sneaks Misbah's pills and mixes them into Imran's soup for him to eat. The next day Imran wakes up feeling weird, unaware that Yasmine drugged him. This causes Imran's behaviour to improve to such an extent that Misbah is convinced that his anger is gone, making her decide to throw away her pills, but not before Yasmine sneaks them again.

Kameela soon visits the Maaliks again for lunch. At this point, Imran and Brooke are already an item, and have arranged to see each other for lunch, but unfortunately for Imran the lunch with Kameela has clashed with his and Brooke's meeting, so as a compromise Brooke joins the family. Kameela is indifferent to the fact that Imran has a girlfriend, and lays into Sami for setting James up for murder, before she sees Brooke writing in her diary during lunch and wrongly accusing her of copying the conversation word for word. Imran immediately jumps to Brooke's defense, saying Kameela is the worst when it comes to judgement, and Misbah tells Imran to stop throwing tantrums. Brooke runs out in the heat of the argument, despite protests from Imran. As Kameela leaves and berates Misbah for her family being such a shambles, Imran is trying to talk Brooke round, before telling Misbah that she ruined his relationship with Brooke. Yasmine breaks up the argument between Misbah and Imran, and before he can hit anyone, he slams his fist onto the table in anger, which Sami later sees and decides that Imran should be checked in hospital. However, after the check up, it is found out that there are traces of drugs in Imran's system, which makes Yasmine panic, and Misbah as well since she is covering for Yasmine, having just been suspended from her job for wrongly administering drugs. The following day the truth comes out when Imran is practicing boxing as a means of dealing with his anger, when Imran sees a pack of pills fall out of Yasmine's handbag. He quickly realises that Yasmine was drugging him the whole time, and angrily punches Yasmine in the stomach with a boxing glove, causing a massive bruise, which she is forced to keep quiet about by Imran otherwise he will hurt her again. When Storm Belinda hit the village, Imran wanted to go and check on Brooke, but Misbah wanted him safe due to the storm, and Imran accused Misbah of punishing him and prioritizing Yasmine over him before punching her.

Following the death of Tegan Lomax, Ste Hay blamed Misbah for her death as she had made an error caused by injuries sustained from being attacked by Imran. Late at night, Imran caught Ste at his food truck by himself and viciously attacked him, with the food truck catching alight. Imran decided to seek help for his anger and was checked into a clinic. He was discharged in January 2019 and testified in Buster's trial for sexually abusing Ollie and Brody Hudson, revealing that Buster had acted inappropriately on the Barcelona trip.

Ste created a hate campaign against Misbah after Tegan's death, with Imran punching him after being provoked, over an image Ste had posted of Misbah. The next day, Imran confessed to the police and was given a caution by D.S. Yates. Ste pushed further and convinced Sally to suspend Imran for two weeks. The harassment from Ste continued and Imran also became a target of racial abuse from Ste's friend Jonny Baxter, a member of Stuart Sumner's far-right extremist organisation. Stuart's son Sid made false allegations to Sally that Imran had made terrorist threats against the school, but Officer Turley quickly realised that the allegations were malicious. As Ste, Jonny, Stuart and Sid moved into 65 Christleton Terrace, the targeted racism continued.

A few months later, a bomb was accidentally detonated in the backyard of 65 Christleton Terrace, leaving Yasmine deaf. Imran worked to generate negative publicity for The Teahouse, and supported Yasmine as she tried to come to terms with having lost her hearing. After Sid pushed Stuart off a cliff (to his death) in November 2019, Imran became less resenting with Sid but advised him to keep out of his way. However, when Imran's friend Juliet Nightingale began dating Sid, Imran showed no hostility.

In January 2020, Imran was offered drugs by a dealer, with Imran taking a photo of him to post on social media to warn the other villagers. The next day, Imran caught the dealer outside of Hollyoaks High School and the pair fought, with Mason pulling a knife and stabbing Nancy Osborne in the process. After Brooke fell pregnant and placed their and Ollie's baby for adoption, Imran tried to comfort Ollie. Ollie ended up developing a ketamine addiction and cheated on Brooke with Juliet, tearing the friend group apart. Imran began a relationship with Brooke and supported them when they came out as non-binary, but Brooke broke up with Imran to begin a relationship with Ripley Lennox.

Imran's cousin Shaq Qureshi arrived in the village in March 2021 to the family's delight. However, Shaq's arrival revealed some of the family's darkest secrets as Misbah revealed that she was Shaq's biological mother, not her sister Hasina. Imran lied to his family that he had been accepted for a photography course at university, but ended up confessing in November. The family were left devastated when Misbah revealed that Shaq had been conceived through rape. Misbah's rapist Ali Shahzad tried to manipulate Misbah, her family and anyone else who would listen into believing that Misbah was mistaken. After Shaq's girlfriend Verity Hutchinson and ex-girlfriend Theresa McQueen failed to get Ali arrested, Imran grabbed a knife and threatened to kill Ali if he did not confess. Ali confessed to Imran, which was overheard by the family. To prevent Ali going to the police, Sami threatened to have Ali murdered if he didn't make a confession to the poilice, which he did.

Attempting to move forward with his life, Imran applied for a job at The Love Boat, but lost to Sid and his girlfriend Lizzie Chen-Williams. However, he began to struggle with the family keeping secrets from him, as well as being made to feel inadequate by Shaq and Lizzie's brother Sam Chen-Williams. Imran ended up getting drunk, returning home to reveal his decision to renounce his faith. Misbah arranged for mosque Imam Zain Rizwaan to speak with Imran, but Imran could not be persuaded to change his mind. After being offered a job at The Dog in the Pond and befriending landlord Tony Hutchinson, Imran began distancing himself from his family more.

Imran ended up befriending Serena Chen-Williams, comforting her after she faced being kicked off her track & field team. He began to get fitness advice from Serena, becoming self-conscious about his weight and physique. He also began eating considerably less, resulting in Imran passing out on several occasions. After harshly rejecting Serena after she expressed interest in sleeping with him, Serena confronted Imran over his behaviour. Imran claimed that he had too much to deal with with his family and broke up with her.

After being left seriously ill in hospital after collapsing, Misbah discovered that Imran was anorexic. Imran initially rejected his diagnosis, but Misbah and Doctor Lewis convinced him to admit that he had an eating disorder. As Imran faced a long waitlist to be admitted to an inpatient clinic, Misbah falsified his records and he was admitted to Woodglade Wellness Clinic in January 2023.

== Sami Maalik ==
Sami Maalik
- Hollyoaks character
- Portrayed by: Rishi Nair
- Duration: 2017–2021
- First appearance: Episode 4743; 27 September 2017
- Last appearance: Episode 5747; 21 December 2021
- Introduced by: Bryan Kirkwood
- Spin-off appearances: Hollyoaks Later (2020)
In-universe information
- Occupation: Lawyer
- Father: Kashif Maalik
- Mother: Sheeba Desai
- Stepmother: Misbah Maalik
- Half-brothers: Azim Desai; Imran Maalik
- Half-sisters: Farrah Maalik; Yasmine Maalik

Sami Maalik, played by Rishi Nair, made his first appearance on 27 September 2017. The character and casting was announced on 3 August 2017. Sami is the stepson of Misbah Maalik (Harvey Virdi) and the half-brother of Yasmine Maalik (Haiesha Mistry), Imran Maalik (Ijaz Rana) and Farrah Maalik (Krupa Pattani). Sami is billed as a "suave and charming" lawyer who arrives in the village to "reunite with his family" and join James Nightingale's (Gregory Finnegan) law firm, although he will have "an ulterior motive" for beginning work at the law firm. Nair expressed his joy at joining the cast and commented, "I can't wait for everyone to see Sami on screen and see him reunite with the Maalik family."

Nair explained that his character would arrive with "a very driven and very personal purpose" and would create a "stir" in his family. The actor stated that Sami is "a family man" and "very protective" of Yasmine, Imran and Farrah so he would go to great lengths for them. He continued to state that Sami has a good relationship with Misbah and they share "no animosity", despite not being related by blood. Nair said that Sami would be prepared to "do bad things for what he believes is the good cause", before revealing that Sami would have a "juicy" secret when he arrives. In 2018, Nair was nominated for "Best Newcomer" at the Inside Soap Awards. On 17 December 2021, it was revealed that Nair would be departing from Hollyoaks and had already filmed his final scenes in October 2021. Sami's final episode was broadcast on 21 December 2021.

Sami arrives in Hollyoaks and moves in with his family. It is revealed that his father, Kashif Maalik (Nitin Patel), had taken his own life while in prison for embezzling money from the law firm he worked for. Sami always believed his father was innocent and looked to exonerate him. He discovers evidence that James Nightingale was the actual embezzler and had framed his father for the crime.

Sami wants to get revenge on James. He starts by dating James's sister, Ellie Nightingale (Sophie Porley). Then he turns James's lover, Harry Thompson (Parry Glasspool), in to the police for the murder of Amy Barnes (Ashley Slanina-Davies). Sami convinces Harry to plead guilty against James's advice. Sami also beats James up and turns him in for being Harry's pimp. When James reveals that Sami has been trying to destroy him, Ellie, who he had actually fallen for, breaks up with him. Sami hires Kyle Kelly (Adam Rickitt) to get James to fall in love with him. Sami later reveals that the ultimate plan is for Kyle to fake his death and frame James for his murder. Sami wins Ellie around and they get back together.

Sami stages the murder scene, but then Kyle has to be taken to hospital. Afterwards, Kyle tells Sami he wants to be with James and he will no longer take part in the plan. Sami manipulates Kyle into believing that James is having an affair with Harry leading to a fight where Kyle accidentally knocks James unconscious. Sami pressures Kyle into faking his death. Sami finally gets his way when James is charged with Kyle's murder. James tells Sami he knows he is the one who framed him, but Sami refuses to back down. Sami is thrilled when Ellie tells him she is pregnant. Sadly, Ellie later suffers a miscarriage. Kyle returns to town and reveals everything Sami has done, leading to him being arrested. Ellie ends her relationship with Sami and leaves town.

During a severe storm, Sami picks up a stranded woman named Sinead Shelby (Stephanie Davis) and they sleep together. Sami is attracted to Sinead, but it is revealed she is married to a man named Laurie Shelby (Kyle Pryor). Laurie asks Sami to help him pay off a woman from the previous school he worked at who accused him of sexual harassment.

== Sebastian Blake ==
Sebastian Blake
- Hollyoaks character
- Portrayed by: Oakley and Ocean (2017); Rorie Graham (2017–2018); Eric (2019); Elliott Parsonage (2020); Teddie Williamson (2022–present)
- Duration: 2017–2020, 2022–present
- First appearance: Episode 4772; 7 November 2017
- Introduced by: Bryan Kirkwood
In-universe information
- Father: Warren Fox
- Mother: Sienna Blake
- Sisters: Sophie Blake
- Half-brothers: Joel Dexter
- Half-sisters: Nico Blake; Ella Richardson; Maria-Gabriella Fox-McQueen
- Grandfathers: Jeremy Blake
- Grandmothers: Anna Blake; Norma Crow
- Uncles: Dodger Savage; Will Savage
- Aunts: Katy Fox; Liberty Savage
- Nephews: Noah Dexter; Joseph McQueen
- Nieces: Tori Devine-Banks; Clara Dexter
- First cousins: Faith; Nico Blake
- Other relatives: Martha Blake; Patrick Blake; Dilly Harcourt; Minnie Minniver

Sebastian Blake (also Sean Fox) is the son of Sienna Blake (Anna Passey) and Warren Fox (Jamie Lomas), born on-screen alongside his sister Sophie on 7 November 2017. Sebastian was born underweight so he was kept in a ventilator.

Sebastian was abducted by his father Warren. Sebastian departed on 17 January 2020 with Sophie and Sienna as Passey taken a break from her role, him and Sophie both will return later in the year with their mother.

== Sophie Blake ==
Sophie Blake
- Hollyoaks character
- Portrayed by: Lottie and Laylie (2017); Rubie Graham (2017); Phoebe (2019); Daisy Parsonage (2020); Scarlett Kerr (2022–present)
- Duration: 2017, 2019–2020, 2022–present
- First appearance: Episode 4772; 7 November 2017
- Introduced by: Bryan Kirkwood
In-universe information
- Father: Warren Fox
- Mother: Sienna Blake
- Brothers: Sebastian Blake
- Half-brothers: Joel Dexter
- Half-sisters: Nico Blake; Ella Richardson; Maria-Gabriella Fox-McQueen
- Grandfathers: Jeremy Blake
- Grandmothers: Anna Blake; Norma Crow
- Uncles: Dodger Savage; Will Savage
- Aunts: Katy Fox; Liberty Savage
- Nephews: Noah Dexter; Joseph McQueen
- Nieces: Tori Devine-Banks; Clara Dexter
- First cousins: Faith; Nico Blake
- Other relatives: Martha Blake; Patrick Blake; Dilly Harcourt; Minnie Minniver

Sophie Blake (also Katy Fox and Ursula Fox) is the daughter of Sienna Blake (Anna Passey) and Warren Fox (Jamie Lomas). She was born in the episode airing 7 November 2017 alongside twin brother Sebastian. Shortly after her birth, she was abducted by her father Warren who renamed her Katy, after his late sister Katy Fox (Hannah Tointon). A number of months later, Warren returned for Sebastian – leaving Sienna with neither children.

In 2019, Sienna tracked down the twins at a hotel, being looked after by an au pair.

== Other characters ==
| Character | Date(s) | Actor | Circumstances |
|---|---|---|---|
| Karen | 11 January | Isabel Ford | A social worker, who visits Amy Barnes (Ashley Slanina-Davies) after Harry Thompson (Parry Glasspool) reports her over a video of her jokingly pushing cake in her daughter Leah's (Ela-May Demircan) face. |
| Miss Ferris | 17 January | Carolyn Backhouse | A consultant who tells Esther Bloom (Jazmine Franks) and Kim Butterfield (Daisy Wood-Davis) that Esther's post-traumatic memory loss and mood swings could be permanent. |
| Doctor Latham | 20 January | Chris Finch | A doctor who diagnoses Nancy Osborne (Jessica Fox) with multiple sclerosis. |
| Judge | 9 February | Andy Burke | The judge who presides over Jack Osborne's (Jimmy McKenna) murder trial for killing Callum Alexander. |
| Gwen | 2 March | Joy Blakeman | A social worker who visits Leela Lomax (Kirsty-Leigh Porter) after Daniel Lomax is kidnapped by Neeta Kaur (Amrit Maghera). |
| D.C. Hammond | 21 March 2017 – 17 December 2018 | Verity Henry | A police officer who takes Nick Savage (Ben-Ryan Davies) in for questioning after Ellie Nightingale (Sophie Porley) reports him for raping her. D.C. Hammond takes Nick's statement, and tells him that if Ellie was not in a fit state to consent, then he did rape her. She later conducted an interview with Freddie Roscoe (Charlie Clapham), and after he snapped at her following her asking some personal questions she postponed the interview. When she resumed the interview, Freddie lied to her that Lisa Loveday (Rachel Adedeji) had seen Nick spike Ellie's drink. The next day, D.C. Hammond interviews Lisa, and she backed up his lie, but after she heard that Nick could go to jail for 10 years, she retracted her statement, admitting that she had lied. The next day, D.C. Hammond informed Ellie that the CPS would not be pressing charges due to insufficient evidence. After Holly Cunningham (Amanda Clapham) comes forward, after Nick rapes her, D.C. Hammond arrests Nick again. She later releases him on bail, before listening to him confess to unconsensual sex with both Ellie and Holly. D.C. Hammond later informs Brody Hudson (Adam Woodward) and Damon Kinsella (Jacob Roberts) that Buster Smith (Nathan Sussex) is planning on pleading not guilty to the sexual abuse charges that he is facing. She briefs Brody on what to expect on the witness stand, but he refuses to testify. However, when his mind is changed he films a video statement with D.C. Hammond. After Brody's case is dropped, Damon approaches her with a false statement, saying that he heard an argument over the abuse. |
| Sonographer | 13 April | Rachel Toomes | A sonographer who tells Warren Fox (Jamie Lomas) and Sienna Blake (Anna Passey) that they are having twins. |
| Auntie Christine | 13 April | Kim Taylforth | Freddie Roscoe's (Charlie Clapham) aunt. After visiting her sister, Freddie's mother Sandy Roscoe (Gillian Taylforth) in South Africa, Christine returns, and gives Freddie his daughter, Lexi Roscoe, telling him that Sandy cannot cope with looking after her as well as her grandson, Lexi's half-brother and cousin JJ. |
| Donny | 14 April | Chris Clarkson | An estate agent for Sally St. Claire (Annie Wallace) and Neeta Kaur (Amrit Maghera). Due to Neeta's poor credit history, she and Sally pose as a couple, and when Neeta leaves for the bathroom, Donny questions Sally about her relationship, and ends up sowing doubts in her mind about their continuing friendship. |
| Melissa | 18 April | Audrie Woodhouse | A judge for the Pub of the Year competition, who visits The Dog in the Pond. Ellie Nightingale (Sophie Porley) attempts to impress, but snaps at her after misinterpreting one of her comments. After Freddie Roscoe (Charlie Clapham) smooths things over with Ellie, they both apologise to each other, and Melissa tells Ellie that she is in with a shot of winning. |
| Doctor Monroe | 19 April | Giles Ford | A doctor who falsely diagnoses Mac Nightingale (David Easter) with Alzheimer's disease after being blackmailed by Marnie Nightingale (Lysette Anthony) and James Nightingale (Gregory Finnegan). |
| Father McGraw | 25 April | Mark Morrell | A priest who conducts Amy Barnes' (Ashley Slanina-Davies) funeral service alongside Joel Dexter (Rory Douglas-Speed). |
| Clerk | 27 April | Rick Bithell | A clerk who takes Ste Hay's (Kieron Richardson) plea on whether he killed Amy Barnes (Ashley Slanina-Davies) or not. |
| Ken Molesley | 1 May | Glenn Carter | The tour manager for The Trolling Drones, a The Rolling Stones tribute band, that Scott Drinkwell (Ross Adams), Mercedes McQueen (Jennifer Metcalfe) and Lily Drinkwell (Lauren McQueen) visit under the impression that he is Scott's real father. Ken rejects the claims, but tells them that he recently met Scott's real mother, Maggie Kinsella (Michelle Holmes), who was going under the name of Greta. |
| Roberta Shaw | 1–2 May | Emma Gregory | A councillor who goes on a date with Sally St. Claire (Annie Wallace). Roberta rushes off after an important phone call, leaving Sally feeling dejected, but she later arranges a second date with Sally. While on the date, Roberta starts feeling funny, and after Simone Loveday (Jacqueline Boatswain) confronts her over her planning application, she leaves for the bathroom. On her way there, she collapses from a heart attack and dies. |
| Registrar | 9–10 May | Eve Burley | A registrar at the wedding of Adam Donovan (Jimmy Essex) and Maxine Minniver (Nikki Sanderson). The wedding is delayed due to Maxine and Adam arguing over his faithfulness, but once it has been resolved, the registrar marries them. |
| Doctor | 15 May | Jenna Manning | A doctor who informs Courtney Campbell (Amy Conachan) about the risks of her carrying a baby because of her disability. |
| Doctor Cohen | 18–19 May | Mark Holgate | A doctor who treats Mac Nightingale (David Easter) after he suffers a mini-stroke. Doctor Cohen later runs memory tests on Mac, and confirms that he does not have Alzheimer's. |
| Paramedic | 23 May | Helen Buchanan | A paramedic who advises Prince McQueen (Malique Thompson-Dwyer), Tom Cunningham (Ellis Hollins), Alfie Nightingale (Richard Linnell) and Joel Dexter (Rory Douglas-Speed) to get checked out at the hospital after a car accident. The paramedic is in the ambulance that comes to find Joel and Cleo McQueen (Nadine Rose Mulkerrin), after Joel goes back to get her. The paramedic asks for a defibrillator after Cleo flatlines in the ambulance. |
| Butler | 5–6 June | Adam Fogerty | A thug who attacks Warren Fox (Jamie Lomas) and Grace Black (Tamara Wall). Butler and a partner, tie them up and interrogate Warren over Bart McQueen (Jonny Clarke). Goldie McQueen (Chelsee Healey) interrupts them, and Butler supervises her as she takes her final paycheck, before escorting her out. In that time Warren and Grace manage to free themselves, and they attacked Butler and his partner. Butler and his partner then fled. Warren saw Butler the next day, and threatened him into revealing who hired him. Butler revealed that it was Grace. |
| Woody | 6–7 June | Jack Hartley | One of Ste Hay's (Kieron Richardson) fellow prison inmates. At the end of one of Harry Thompson's (Parry Glasspool) visits to Ste, Woody tells Harry to smuggle drugs into the prison, or he would hurt Ste. |
| Guard | 8 June | Andrew Westfield | A guard who supervises Harry Thompson (Parry Glasspool) and Tony Hutchinson (Nick Pickard) when they visit Ste Hay (Kieron Richardson) in hospital. As the guard is escorting Ste back to prison, Ste has a blackout, and pushes the guard off him before escaping. |
| Doctor Nelson | 14 June | Kaya Brady | A doctor who refers Lily Drinkwell (Lauren McQueen) to a dermatologist over a scar she sustained in a car crash. |
| Cashier | 27 June | Emily Hayworth | A cashier at the bank where Cleo McQueen (Nadine Rose Mulkerrin) and Shane Sweeney (Michael Salami) withdraw Goldie McQueen's (Chelsee Healey) money. |
| Dr. Gregory | 29 June | Joe Osbourne | A psychologist who Farrah Maalik (Krupa Pattini) refers Kim Butterfield (Daisy Wood-Davis) to following Kim trying to kiss her. |
| Gabriel | 3 July | Joshua Hayes | An angelic representation of Mercedes McQueen's (Jennifer Metcalfe) stillborn son had he lived and grown to be an adult. Mercedes sees Gabriel in The Folly, where he convinces her to go see her other son, Bobby, who lives in America. |
| Returning Officer | 7 July | Jowanna Rose | A returning officer for the Hollyoaks by-election who announces that Simone Loveday (Jacqueline Boatswain) has won. |
| Marcus | 11–12 July | Dean Ashton | Darcy Wilde's (Aisling Jarrett-Gavin) former partner, who she claimed was her son Toby's father and listed him on his birth certificate. Marcus arrives at the hospital after being contacted by Misbah Maalik (Harvey Virdi), as he is listed as Toby's next of kin. Darcy tells her ex-boyfriend Adam Donovan (Jimmy Essex), his wife Maxine Minniver (Nikki Sanderson) and his brother Jesse Donovan (Luke Jerdy) that Marcus is her cousin, but Marcus states he is Toby's father. Despite being warned to leave, Marcus stays and threatens to take Toby unless Darcy returns him the money she conned from him. Adam pays Marcus £30,000 instead of £40,000 and tells him to leave. A paternity test later reveals that Adam is Toby's biological father. |
| Elizabeth | 17–18 July | Harriet Thorpe | A public health inspector who, when she was younger, was bullied by Marnie Nightingale (Lysette Anthony) at school. Elizabeth performs a health inspection on Nightingale's, and after finding out that Marnie is the owner, she fails them. Myra McQueen (Nicole Barber-Lane) later calls Elizabeth back, and in return for giving Nightingale's a clean bill of health, Elizabeth gets to put Marnie in a bin as revenge. |
| Dr. Jones | 21 July | Emma Bowe | A doctor who performs a sonography on Sienna Blake (Anna Passey) after she suffers from stomach pains and bleeding. Dr. Jones confirms the sexes of Sienna's babies, before telling her that she is going to perform a smear test on her. |
| Doctor Rogers | 24 July | Alison George | A doctor who diagnoses Sienna Blake (Anna Passey) with cervical cancer. |
| Jordan Cooper | 15 August – 7 December | Mark Peachey | A private investigator hired by Grace Black (Tamara Wall) to investigate Darcy Wilde (Aisling Jarrett-Gavin). Darcy catches wind of the plot, and she later meets with the private investigator and bribes him to tell Grace that he found nothing. He later approaches Darcy again, demanding more money. When Darcy does not pay up, he calls Tracey Donovan (Lisa Maxwell) and tells her Darcy's secret. After Tracey is killed by Darcy, Jordan threatens to turn her in, but Darcy manipulates him into not doing so. Maxine Minniver (Nikki Sanderson) later matches with Jordan on a speed dating night, and she soon discovers his identity. Not long afterwards, he tells Maxine that Adam Donovan (Jimmy Essex) isn't the father of Toby Wilde (Lucas Haywood). |
| Police Officer | 17–31 August | Stephen Fletcher | A police officer who pulls Tom Cunningham (Ellis Hollins) over after he is driving too slow. After Nancy Osborne (Jessica Fox) explains that Tom had recently been in a car crash, the police officer decides to let him off with a caution. The police officer shows up again after Mac Nightingale (David Easter) reports his car as stolen. Although Mac tries taking the report back, the police officer shows him a picture of the car speeding with Neeta Kaur (Amrit Maghera) and Hunter McQueen (Theo Graham) in it. |
| Charlotte Grimshaw | 21 August 2017 – 19 January 2018 | Rachel Teate | A social services officer who takes Ella Richardson (Erin Palmer) away from her mother, Mandy Richardson (Sarah Jayne Dunn), after Luke Morgan (Gary Lucy) leaves her unsupervised. Charlotte visits Mandy the next day, and tells her that she plans to help get Ella back, however, she gets second thoughts after Luke shows up drunk. A few months later, Charlotte visits Mandy and Luke again. She is satisfied with the progress that they have made, and she allows Ella to return into custody of them |
| Janet Garner | 4–8 September | Susan Cookson | The prosecuting barrister at the trial of Ste Hay (Kieron Richardson) for the murder of Amy Barnes (Ashley Slanina-Davies). She takes testimonies from Ryan Knight (Duncan James), Tony Hutchinson (Nick Pickard) and Mike Barnes (Tony Hirst). Despite her best efforts, Ste is found not guilty of murder. |
| Judge Francis Hume | 4–8 September | Paul Brown | The judge at the trial of Ste Hay (Kieron Richardson) for the murder of Amy Barnes (Ashley Slanina-Davies). He adjourns the trial for the day after Ste collapses from chest pains. He also threatens to charge Mike Barnes (Tony Hirst) with contempt of court after he keeps going out of the realms of questioning, and orders Harry Thompson (Parry Glasspool) to leave after his repeated outbursts at James Nightingale's (Gregory Finnegan) ineptitude in defending Ste. After Ste is acquitted, Hume orders his release from custody. |
| Kate Garraway | 4–8 September | Herself | A television and radio presenter who reports on the trial of the murder of Amy Barnes (Ashley Slanina-Davies). |
| Court Clerk | 8 September | Darren Kemp | A court clerk who asks the jury whether they found Ste Hay (Kieron Richardson) guilty for the murder of Amy Barnes (Ashley Slanina-Davies). |
| Police Officer | 26 September 2017, 16 February 2018 | John Weaver | A police officer who issues Hunter McQueen (Theo Graham) with a caution after Mac Nightingale (David Easter) reports him for causing a fight between Prince McQueen (Malique Thompson-Dwyer) and Damon Kinsella (Jacob Roberts). He later attends a disturbance at Sienna Blake's (Anna Passey) flat. |
| Isaac | 27–28 September | Rick S. Carr | A fellow inmate of Darren Osborne (Ashley Taylor Dawson), who Nancy Osborne (Jessica Fox) learns is threatening him because of Darren being a "grass". The next day, when Tom Cunningham (Ellis Hollins) brings Charlie Dean (Charlie Behan) to visit Darren, Isaac learns where Darren lives, and uses this to threaten him further. |
| Mr Neville | 10 October | Ian Kirkby | A bank manager who visits Nightingale's to hear Tony Hutchinson's (Nick Pickard) pitch to take over the business and transform it into a healthy eating restaurant. Tony offer Mr Neville a prawn linguine, but Mr Neville questions its healthiness. When Mr Neville keeps asking why Harry Thompson (Parry Glasspool) isn't present, and points out a stain on Tony's jacket, Tony flips out and storms away. |
| Police Officer | 20 October | Alan Stocks | A police officer who questions Cindy Savage (Stephanie Waring) over her sale of a stolen TV box to Frankie Osborne (Helen Pearson) and Esther Bloom (Jazmine Franks). Cindy admits to the crime, but flirts with the police officer in the hopes of getting the charges dropped, but she is unsuccessful. |
| D.S. Richards | 27 October | Adam Jowett | A police officer who questions Neeta Kaur (Amrit Maghera) and Hunter McQueen (Theo Graham) over their relationship. However, he is unable to press charges against Neeta, as both her and Hunter deny the relationship. |
| Davina | 31 October–1 November | Kimberly Hart-Simpson | A firefighter who oversees the rescue operation after Mac Nightingale (David Easter) causes a gas explosion at Hollyoaks High. Davina criticises Prince McQueen (Malique Thompson-Dwyer) for trying to use his ladder to save people, and she organises a crane to save Alfie Nightingale (Richard Linnell) and Tom Cunningham (Ellis Hollins). She tries warning Darren Osborne (Ashley Taylor Dawson) against going back into the building, but he ignores her. When Darren and Luke Morgan (Gary Lucy) find Jack Osborne (Jimmy McKenna) pinned by concrete, Davina oversees the operation to free him. |
| Lucy | 1 November | Claire Lever | A nurse at the hospital. |
| Bella | 8 November | Sarah Byrne | A stripper hired for Dirk Savage's (David Kennedy) stag party. Milo Entwistle (Nathan Morris) bribes her into kissing Dirk, and this is witnessed by Holly Cunningham (Amanda Clapham), making her think that Dirk is cheating on her mother, Cindy (Stephanie Waring). |
| Cherlover73 | 23 November | Daniel Hall | A fan of the pop singer Cher, who sells Jack Osborne (Jimmy McKenna) a limited edition Cher record for Frankie Osborne's (Helen Pearson) funeral. As Jack and Darren Osborne (Ashley Taylor Dawson) are late for Frankie's funeral, Cherlover73 drives them there on his motorbike. His real name is never revealed. |
| Jenna Gibbs | 12–15 December | Laura Hopper | The wife of Mark Gibbs (Colin Parry) and mother of his two children. As Luke Morgan (Gary Lucy), Mark's rape victim, waits for him to arrive so he can confront him, Jenna knocks on his window and asks for help in changing her tyre. Luke agrees to help, and eventually finds out that she is Mark's wife. After hearing that she is having difficulty getting to the gym because of family life, Luke offers to become Jenna's personal trainer. Luke meets her the next day, and inquires about Mark's history. When Jenna tells Luke that Mark was in prison for GBH and was unfairly convicted, Luke is angered, they argue, and Jenna leaves. Jenna comes across a confrontation between Luke and Mark and Luke reveals that Mark raped him. Jenna questions him about the accusation, but Mark can't answer. Jenna is left reeling from the discovery and runs off. |
| Iona | 22 December 2017 – 25 March 2020 | Isla Jordan | Iona is the daughter of Courtney Campbell (Amy Conachan) and Liam Donovan (Maxim Baldry). |
| Dr Khan | 27 December | Nisha Anil | A doctor who diagnoses Sienna Blake (Anna Passey) with a chest infection. As a result of Sebastian Blake's cold, she recommends that Sienna stay away from him. Later, she diagnoses Maggie Kinsella (Michelle Holmes). |
| Booth | 29 December | James Godden | A thug who attacks Luke Morgan (Gary Lucy) under the belief that he is Darren Osborne (Ashley Taylor Dawson). Booth only stops when Grace Black (Tamara Wall) sees him, and rushes over to help Luke. |
