= Bob Cryer (actor) =

English actor (born 1973)

- Born: Robert Charles John Cryer; 24 November 1973 (age 52); Marylebone, London, England
- Occupation: Actor
- Years active: 1998–present
- Television: Hollyoaks
- Father: Barry Cryer

Robert Charles John Cryer (born 24 November 1973) is an English actor, known for portraying Glenn Donovan in the Channel 4 soap opera Hollyoaks between 2017 and 2018. He has since appeared in fellow British soap operas Coronation Street and EastEnders

== Life and career ==
Robert Charles Cryer was born on 24 November 1973 in Marylebone, London. He was the youngest child born to actor Barry Cryer (1935–2022) and his wife, singer Theresa Donovan. He has three older siblings: Anthony, David and Jacqueline. He studied at the University of Warwick, attaining a Bachelor of Arts in English and Theatre, before studying at the London Academy of Music and Dramatic Art. He made his screen debut in Highlander: The Series, and also appeared in episodes of Coronation Street and Colour Blind. He went on to appear in episodes of various other television series including Plastic Man, Bliss and Jake 2.0. In 2004, he provided voice work for the video game The Getaway: Black Monday. He also went on to make appearances in Holby City, Our Hidden Lies, Bombshell, The Bill, Superbad, Doctors, No Signal! and Victoria Wood's Mid Life Christmas.

After appearing in a minor role of D.S. Tanfield in the Channel 4 soap opera Hollyoaks in 2011, he joined the cast on a permanent basis in 2017, taking over the role of Glenn Donovan from previous actor Neil Roberts. He remained in the role for a year, before his character was killed off by serial killer Breda McQueen (Moya Brady). From 2020 to 2022, he appeared as football manager Robert Dover in the ITV soap opera Coronation Street. In 2025, Cryer appeared in the BBC soap opera EastEnders as D.I. Wren, later reprising the role for a flashforward episode that aired in 2026. Later in 2026, he appeared in an episode of the Netflix series Legends.

== Filmography ==
Year	Title	Role	Notes
1998	Highlander: The Series	Brian Murphy	Episode: "Deadly Exposure"
1998	Coronation Street	Inspector Johnson	1 episode
1998	Colour Blind	Frank Barton	1 episode
1999	Plastic Man	Disco Man	1 episode
2003	Bliss	Louis	Episode: "Three"
2003	Jake 2.0	Eric Vaughn	Episode: "The Tech"
2004	Crown Heights	Rabbi	Television film
2004	The Getaway: Black Monday	Sergeant Ben Mitchell	Video game
2005	Holby City	Martin Dunstan	Episode: "Pleasant Surprises"
2005	Our Hidden Lies	Canadian	Television film
2006	Bombshell	Guy Corderey	4 episodes
2007	The Bill	Darren Carew	Episode: "Don't Cut No Ice"
2007	Superbad	Sergeant Ben Mitchell	Film role
2008	Doctors	James Trentham	Episode: "Regular Fare"
2009	No Signal!	Various	3 episodes
2009	Victoria Wood's Mid Life Christmas	Steve Codlington / TV Ad Voice Over	Television special
2011	Hollyoaks	D.S. Tanfield	1 episode
2012	Videophone	Det. Cave	Short film
2012	Outnumbered	PC Dixon	Episode: "Christmas Special 2012"
2015	The Interceptor	Rob Kane	4 episodes
2015	Legend	Charles Kray Snr.	Film role
2016	Grimsby	News Reporter	Film role
2017	Urban Myths	Jerome / Barman	Episode: "Samuel Beckett and Andre the Giant"
2017	Warhammer 40,000: Dawn of War	Space Marines / Orks	Video game
2017–2018	Hollyoaks	Glenn Donovan	Regular role
2019	Professional Jesus	Professional Jesus	Short film
2020–2022	Coronation Street	Robert Dover	Recurring role; 7 episodes
2021	Giddy Stratospheres	Cabbie	Film role
2022	The Adventures of Maid Marian	The Sheriff of Nottingham	Film role
2023	The Gold	PC Dylan George	Episode: "There's Something Going on in Kent"
2023	The Undertaker	Pullman	Film role
2024	Fortunes of War	General Horseler	Film role
2025–2026	EastEnders	D.I. Wren	Recurring role
2025	Joke	Train Announcer	Short film
2026	Legends	Frank	Episode: "This Is Liverpool"
