= Jacob Roberts =

English actor (born 1990)

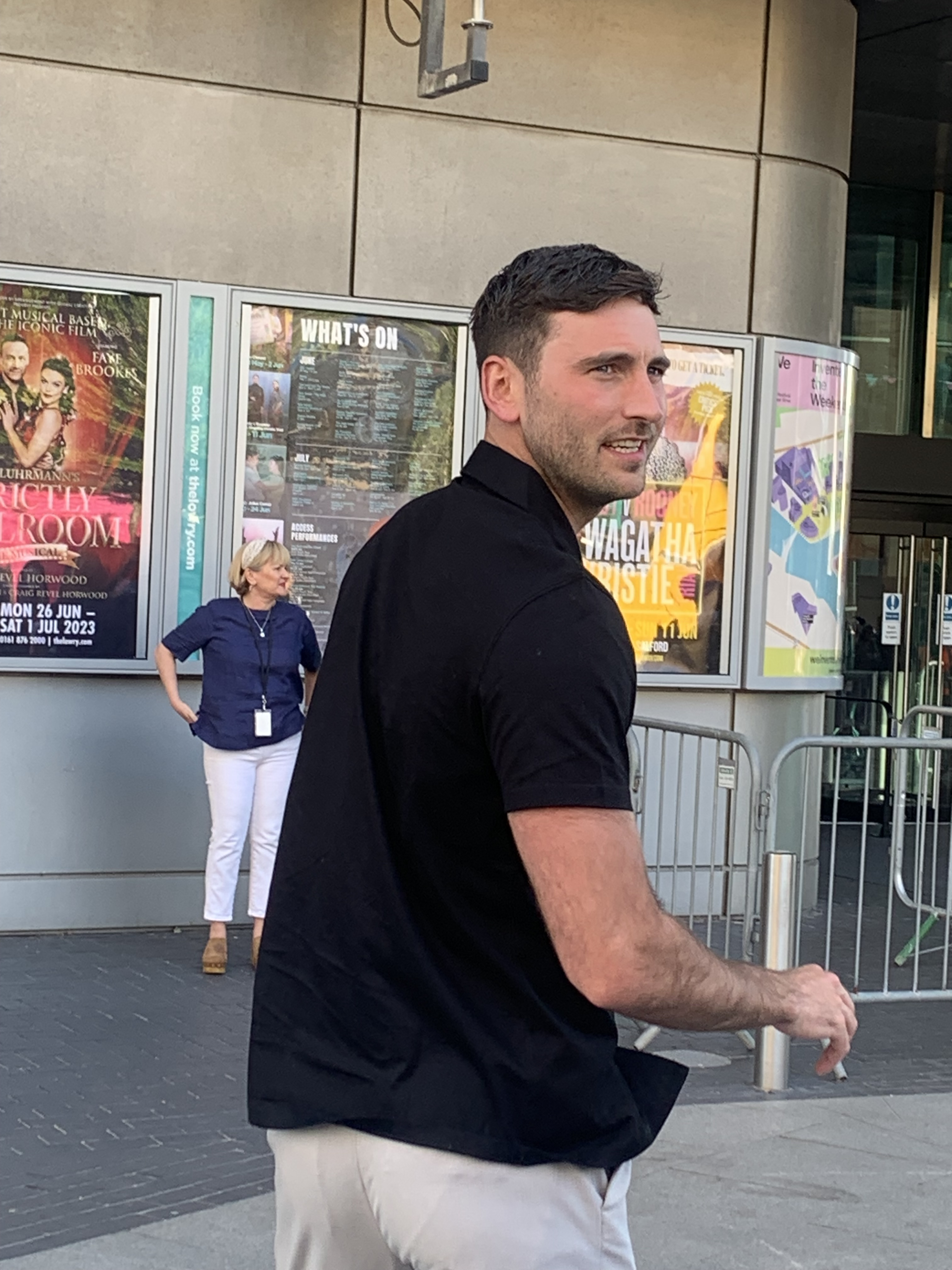
- Roberts in 2023
- Born: Jacob Roberts; 29 June 1990 (age 36); Salford, Greater Manchester, England
- Occupation: Actor
- Years active: 2007–present
- Television: Hollyoaks; Coronation Street

Jacob Roberts (born 29 June 1990) is an English actor, known for portraying the role of Damon Kinsella in the Channel 4 soap opera Hollyoaks from 2017 to 2023. In 2024, he joined the cast of the ITV soap opera Coronation Street as Kit Green.

== Life and career ==
Jacob Roberts was born on 29 June 1990 in Salford, Greater Manchester. He studied at David Johnson Drama in Manchester and appeared as Happy Boy in the stage production of Borstal Boy which toured the Edinburgh Fringe Festival in 2007, and New York City in 2008. He has also appeared in various television advertisements including for the theme park Alton Towers and the bank HSBC.

In 2017, Roberts joined the cast of the Channel 4 soap opera Hollyoaks as Damon Kinsella. He was introduced as the secret brother of Scott Drinkwell (Ross Adams) in July 2017 as part of episodes set in Ibiza which saw him being tracked down, alongside the character's best friend Brody Hudson (Adam Woodward). Roberts and Woodward were nominated for the Best Partnership Award at the 2018 Inside Soap Awards for their portrayal of the characters' on-screen friendship. His other storylines during his tenure on the show included the character's marriage to Maxine Minniver (Nikki Sanderson), dealing with the death of Brody and a relationship with Liberty Savage (Jessamy Stoddart). In June 2023, Roberts made an unannounced departure from the soap after six years. His character departed alongside Zara Morgan (Kelly Condron) In 2023, Roberts appeared as Paul Ashton in the film Cara. He then struggled to find roles, instead working as a television ariel installer. However, in 2024, he joined the cast of the ITV soap opera Coronation Street as Kit Green, the estranged son of established character Bernie Winter (Jane Hazlegrove).

== Filmography ==
Year	Title	Role	Notes	Ref(s)
2017–2023	Hollyoaks	Damon Kinsella	Regular role	
2023	Cara	Paul Ashton	Film role	
2024–present	Coronation Street	Kit Green	Regular role	

== Stage ==
Year	Title	Role	Ref.
2007	Borstal Boy	Happy Boy	
2008	Borstal Boy	Happy Boy	
2022	Character Showcase	Various	

== Awards and nominations ==
Year	Award	Category	Work	Result	Ref(s)
2018	Inside Soap Awards	Best Partnership (with Adam Woodward)	Hollyoaks	Nominated	
2025	2025 British Soap Awards	Best Newcomer	Coronation Street	Nominated	
