= Haiesha Mistry =

English actress (born 1993)

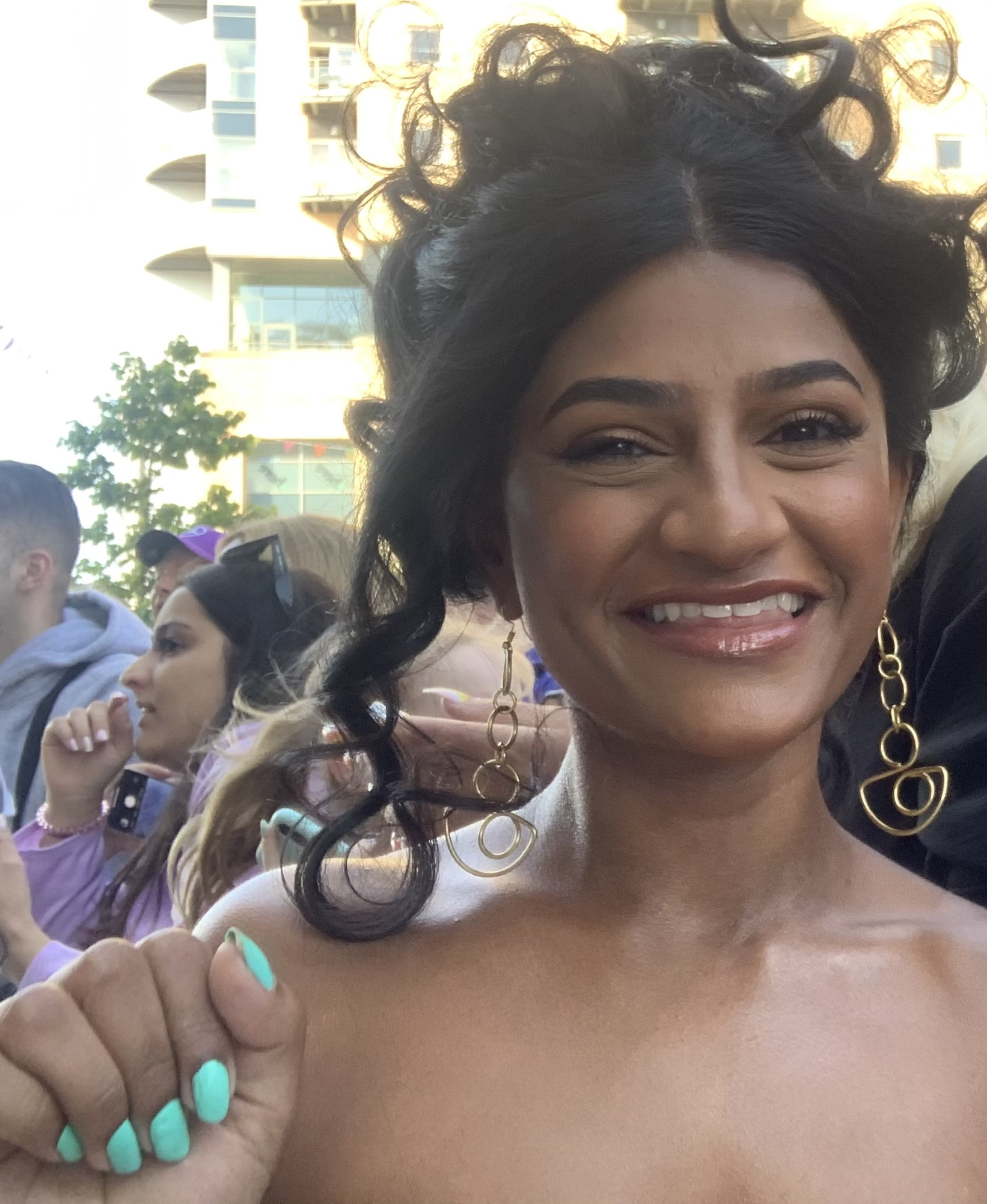
- Mistry in 2023
- Born: Haiesha Natwarlal Mistry; 16 August 1993 (age 33); Tameside, Lancashire, England
- Education: University of Salford
- Occupation: Actress
- Years active: 2017–present
- Television: Hollyoaks

Haiesha Natwarlal Mistry (born 16 August 1993) is an English actress. She is known for portraying the role of Yasmine Maalik in the Channel 4 soap opera Hollyoaks from 2017 to 2024.

== Life and career ==
Mistry was born on 16 August 1993 in Tameside, Lancashire, and is of Indian descent. She attended Droylsden Academy and Clarendon Sixth Form College before going on to study performance and media practices, followed by drama and theatre at the University of Salford, graduating from the latter with a BA (Hons). She previously worked as a jobbing actor and worked five jobs to fund acting auditions. She has appeared in numerous stage productions including Climate of Fear, Mr and Mrs Khan, Michael Rosen's Bear Hunt Chocolate Cake and Bad Things Interactive Experience.

In April 2017, Mistry joined the cast of the Channel 4 soap opera Hollyoaks. Her character Yasmine Maalik was introduced as a "loud and flamboyant" teenager and following the announcement of her casting, Mistry said she was "so excited to be joining Hollyoaks as this [was her] first television credit" and that she was "looking forward to portraying [her] new character. A family was later built for the character, with the introduction of Yasmine's mother Misbah (Harvey Virdi), sister Farrah (Krupa Pattani) and brothers Imran (Ijaz Rana) and Sami (Rishi Nair). Mistry's character was part of a group self-harm storyline that won the British Soap Award for Best Single Episode in 2018. Her other storylines on the show have included her character's Asian family being the target of a far right group, her marriage to Tom Cunningham (Ellis Hollins) and coming to terms with the rape of her mother, the latter of which she won Scene of The Year for alongside Virdi at the British Soap Awards in 2022. Mistry took a break from filming Hollyoaks in 2021 to star as Billy Jo in the short film Mug, directed by Jo Lane and produced by Daljinder Johal that was released in 2022.

== Filmography ==
Year	Title	Role	Notes	Ref(s)
2017–2024	Hollyoaks	Yasmine Maalik	Regular role	
2022	Mug	Billy Jo	Short film	

== Stage ==
Title	Ref(s)
Climate of Fear	
Mr and Mrs Khan	
Bear Hunt Chocolate Cake	
Bad Things Interactive Experience	

== Awards and nominations ==
Year	Award	Category	Work	Result	Ref.
2022	British Soap Awards	Scene of the Year (with Harvey Virdi)	Hollyoaks	Won	
