= Adam Woodward =

English actor and model

- Born: 10 June 1992 (age 34); England
- Occupations: Actor; model
- Years active: 2014–present
- Television: Hollyoaks

Adam Woodward (born 10 June 1992) is an English actor and model, known for his two roles in Emmerdale first as Grant then as Nathan, and is also known for playing Brody Hudson in the Channel 4 soap opera Hollyoaks. For his portrayal of Brody, he received the award for Best Male Dramatic Performance at the 2019 British Soap Awards.

== Life and career ==
Prior to acting, Woodward studied Politics and worked as an underwear model. He then trained to become an actor at Act Up North, and made his debut appearance in the 2014 war film The War I Knew. Then in 2015, he appeared in an episode of the ITV soap opera Emmerdale as Grant; he later appeared again in 2017 as Nathan. Later in 2017, he was cast in the Channel 4 soap opera Hollyoaks as series regular Brody Hudson. For his portrayal of Brody, he has received various accolades, including winning Best Male Dramatic Performance at the 2019 British Soap Awards and Best Actor at the 2019 Inside Soap Awards.

== Filmography ==
Year	Title	Role	Notes
2014	The War I Knew	Rock/George	Film
2015	Emmerdale	Grant	2 episodes
2016	Brood Parasite	Ben	Film
2017	Emmerdale	Nathan	6 episodes
2017	The Black Prince	British Spy	Film
2017	Doctors	Duncan Singher	Episode: "Freak"
2017	The Saint	Xander	Film
2017–2021	Hollyoaks	Brody Hudson	Series regular
2018	Judgement	The Man	Short film
2023	Bariau	Kit Brennan	6 episodes
2025	Man with No Past	Ryder	Film

== Awards and nominations ==
Year	Award	Category	Result	Ref.
2017	Inside Soap Awards	Sexiest Male	Nominated	
2018	Inside Soap Awards	Best Partnership (shared with Jacob Roberts)	Shortlisted	
2019	24th National Television Awards	Serial Drama Performance	Nominated	
2019	TV Choice Awards	Best Soap Actor	Nominated	
2019	2019 British Soap Awards	Best Male Dramatic Performance	Won	
2019	Inside Soap Awards	Best Partnership (shared with Anna Passey)	Nominated	
2019	Inside Soap Awards	Best Actor	Won	
