= Family Lives =

United Kingdom-based charity for parents

Family Lives is a United Kingdom-based charity that works for, and with, parents.

== History ==
Parentline Plus was the result of the merger of three charities: Parentline UK, National Stepfamily Association (NSA) and Parent Network. On 7 September 1999 NSA and Parentline UK held AGMs and agreed formally to merge as FamilyLives. Those AGMs were immediately followed by FamilyLives' first Board meeting. Parent Network's merger into the combined charity took place on 31 March 2000. Dorit Braun had led the mergers and became Chief Executive of Parentline Plus (previously appointed Chief Executive of NSA in 1997). She was awarded the OBE in June 2000 and took early retirement April 2008.

== Activities ==
Parentline Plus works to offer help and support through a range of services. These include a national helpline and three websites, Parentline Plus, Parentline Plus Professional and Got A Teenager. The services offered are confidential and free, and the charity claims to take a non-judgmental approach to parenting.

== Area Offices ==
Parentline Plus has eight regional offices, based in Essex, Gloucestershire, Hampshire, Hertfordshire, North East, Nottinghamshire, North London and South London. In Scotland, the same Parentline helpline number is operated by Children 1st which is a separate organisation.

== Got a Teenager ==
Half of the calls received by Parentline Plus are from parents of teenagers. GotATeenager.org.uk is targeted at parents of teenagers. The term "teenglish" was used by the project leader Nikola Mann to describe the language used by teenagers but not understood by their parents.
