= Rishi Nair =

English actor

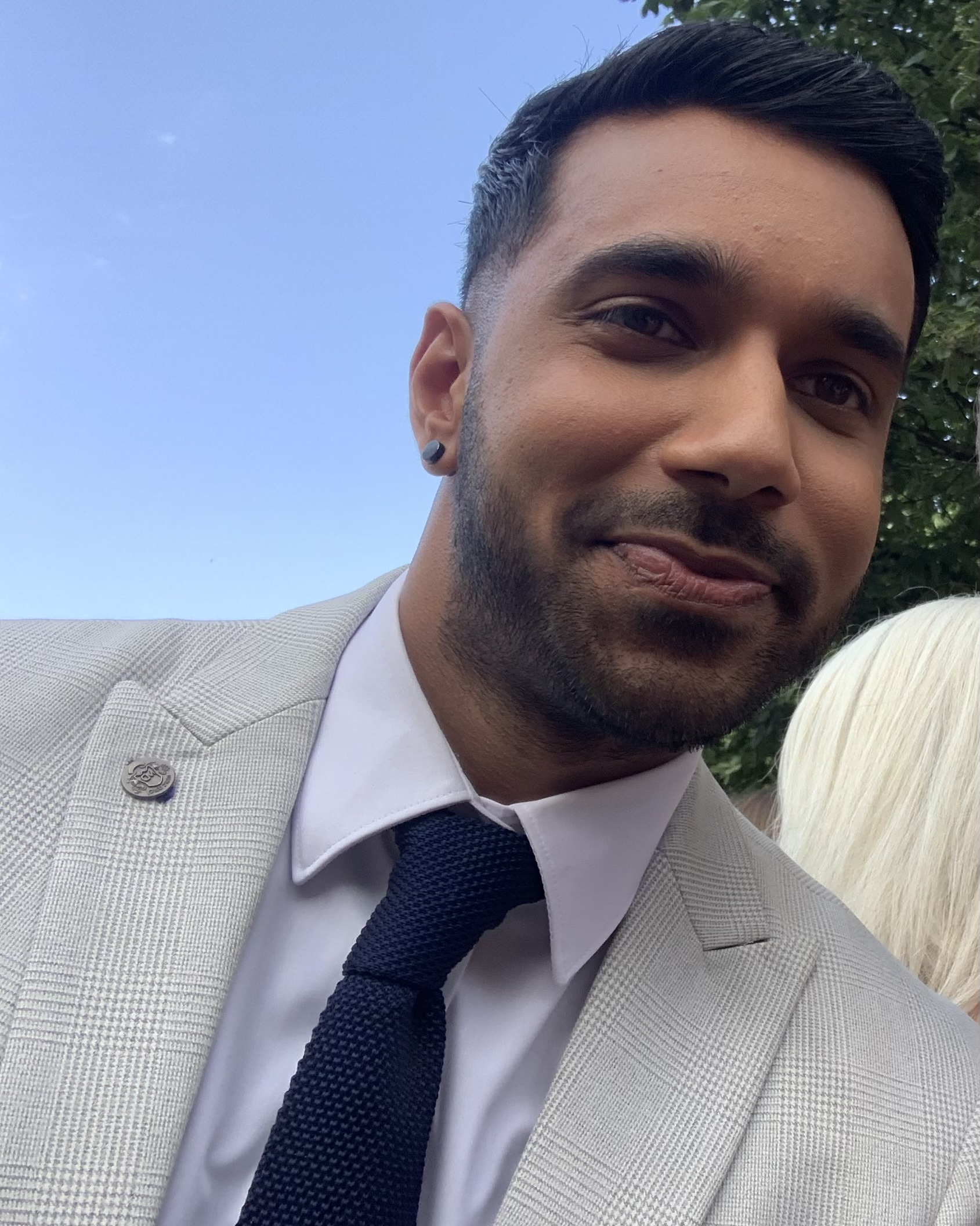
- Nair at the 2022 British Soap Awards
- Born: Rishi Kumar Nair; 22 January 1991 (age 35); Ealing, London, England
- Years active: 2013–present

Rishi Kumar Nair (born 22 January 1991) is a British actor. On television, he is known for his roles in the Channel 4 soap opera Hollyoaks (2017–2021) and the ITV detective drama Grantchester (2024–). He also appeared in the ITVX horror comedy Count Abdulla (2023).

== Early life ==
Nair was born in the West London Borough of Ealing. He grew up in an Indian family. Prior to going into acting school, Nair studied law at university.

== Career ==
Nair made his television debut in 2015 with appearances in episodes of the BBC One police procedurals Silent Witness and New Tricks. He also had stage roles in The Jungle Book at the Emporium Theatre in Brighton, The Sawyer Studies at the Etcetera Theatre in London, and Bring on the Bollywood at Belgrade Theatre in Coventry. He appeared in the independent films I'm Still Here (2013), The Forbidden Note (2016), and Retribution (2017).

Also in 2017, Nair joined the cast of the Channel 4 soap opera Hollyoaks as lawyer Sami Maalik, a new member of the Maalik family, making his debut in September 2017. For his performance, Nair was shortlisted for Best Newcomer at the 2018 Inside Soap Awards. He exited the soap at the end of 2021 after four years.

After leaving Hollyoaks, Nair appeared in the 2022 comedy film Brian and Charles and had guest roles in the Acorn TV crime drama Whitstable Pearl and the Netflix series Treason. In 2023, Nair played Maajid in the ITVX vampire sitcom Count Abdulla. In July 2023, it was announced Nair would join the cast of the ITV detective drama Grantchester for its ninth series as vicar Alphy Kottaram, replacing the outgoing Tom Brittney (who plays Reverend Will Davenport) in the main ensemble.

== Personal life ==
Nair is a patron of the Family Burns Club charity.

== Filmography ==
=== Film ===
Year	Title	Role	Notes
2013	I'm Still Here	Visitor	
2016	The Forbidden Note	Ali	
2017	Retribution	Rohit	
2022	Brian and Charles	Stephen Alderton	

=== Television ===
Year	Title	Role	Notes
2015	Silent Witness	Dean's Heavy	2 episodes
2015	New Tricks	AJ Da Silva	Episode: "Prodigal Sons"
2017–2021	Hollyoaks	Sami Maalik	256 episodes
2020	The Duchess	Receptionist	1 episode
2022	Whitstable Pearl	Adnan	Episode: "To Those We Love"
2022	Treason	Met Officer	1 episode
2023	Count Abdulla	Maajid	5 episodes
2024-present	Grantchester	Alphy Kotteram	Main role
2024	The Marlow Murder Club	Shamil Malik	3 episodes
2026	Grace	Neel Siddiqui	Episode: "Left You Dead"
2026	Monarch Of The Glen	Daniel	
TBA	Romeo Hotel Eleven	Jaye	

== Stage ==
Year	Title	Role	Notes
2015	The Jungle Book	Shere Khan	Emporium Theatre, Brighton
2015	The Sawyer Studies	Connor	Etcetera Theatre, London
2016	Bring on the Bollywood	Amit	Belgrade Theatre, Coventry

== Awards and nominations ==
Year	Award	Category	Work	Result	Ref.
2018	Inside Soap Awards	Best Newcomer	Hollyoaks	Nominated	
2019	Inside Soap Awards	Best Actor	Hollyoaks	Nominated	
2020	25th National Television Awards	Serial Drama Performance	Hollyoaks	Nominated	
2026	31st National Television Awards	Drama Performance	Grantchester	Nominated	
