= List of Hollyoaks characters introduced in 2018 =

Hollyoaks is a British television soap opera that was first broadcast on 23 October 1995. The following is a list of characters that have appeared or will appear in the serial in 2018, by order of first appearance. All characters were introduced by executive producer, Bryan Kirkwood. The first characters to be introduced were Scarlett Morgan (Susie Amy) and Oliver Morgan (Aedan Duckworth/Gabriel Clark), the estranged wife and son of Luke Morgan (Gary Lucy). Buster Smith (Nathan Sussex), the father of Damon Kinsella (Jacob Roberts), was also introduced in January. Theo Jones (Matt Kennard), the brother of Milo Entwistle (Nathan Morris), Harley Frater (Mollie Lambert), the homeless friend of Peri Lomax (Ruby O'Donnell), and Josh Bradley (Rupert Hill), the son of Ben Bradley (Ben Richards), made their debut in April. Breda McQueen (Moya Brady) and Sylver McQueen (David Tag), the mother and brother of Goldie McQueen (Chelsee Healey), and Kameela (Anu Hasan), the sister of Misbah Maalik (Harvey Virdi), first appeared in June.

July features the arrivals of Donna-Marie Quinn (Lucy-Jo Hudson), her son, Romeo (Owen Warner), Brooke Hathaway (Tylan Grant), a foster child for the Osborne family, and Asha Kaur (Rukku Nahar), the sister of Neeta Kaur (Amrit Maghera), as well as the appearance of Kashif Maalik (Nitin Patel). Martine Deveraux (Kéllé Bryan), the sister of Simone Loveday (Jacqueline Boatswain), debuts in October. Three characters were introduced in November: Laurie Shelby (Kyle Pryor), the husband of Sinead O'Connor (Stephanie Davis), Juliet Quinn (Niamh Blackshaw), Donna-Marie's daughter, and Jonny Baxter (Ray Quinn), a radicalist who befriends Ste Hay (Kieron Richardson). Simone and Martine's father, Walter Deveraux (Trevor A. Toussaint), joins the soap in December. Additionally, multiple other characters appear throughout the year.

== Trigger ==
Trigger
- Hollyoaks character
- Portrayed by: Adam Sina
- First appearance: Episode 4828; 17 January 2018
- Last appearance: Episode 4864; 8 March 2018
- Introduced by: Bryan Kirkwood
In-universe information
- Occupation: Gangster

Trigger, played by Adam Sina, was a criminal associate of Glenn Donovan (Bob Cryer), who threatens Glenn and his partner, Grace Black (Tamara Wall) after their drug shipment goes wrong. When Glenn's sons, Adam Donovan (Jimmy Essex) and Jesse Donovan (Luke Jerdy), arrive, Trigger panics, and hits Glenn before fleeing. It emerges that Trigger and Glenn are working together and planned the hit, which Grace later discovers after finding Trigger; she stages Trigger's kidnapping, hoping that Glenn would tell her about Trigger, but this fails when Glenn nearly kills Trigger.

When Adam reports Glenn's crimes to the police, Grace informs Glenn that Trigger informed them, so Glenn threatens him and prepares to kill him until Trigger convinves Glenn that he did not report him. Under Glenn's instructions, Trigger attacks Maxine Minniver (Nikki Sanderson) and steals money that Glenn gave her. Glenn then kills Trigger since he believes that Trigger reported him to the police, and Adam buries his body, which is later discovered by the police. Glenn and Ryan Knight (Duncan James) then frame Shane Sweeney (Michael Salami) for Trigger's murder.

== Scarlett Morgan ==
Scarlett Morgan
- Hollyoaks character
- Portrayed by: Susie Amy
- Duration: 2018, 2022
- First appearance: 19 January 2018
- Last appearance: 7 July 2022
- Introduced by: Bryan Kirkwood (2018); Lucy Allan (2022)
In-universe information
- Husband: Luke Morgan (until 2018)
- Sons: Oliver Morgan
- Grandsons: Thierry

Scarlett Morgan, played by Susie Amy, made her first appearance on 19 January 2018. Amy's casting was announced on 20 October 2017, with further details about her character, including her name, announced on 6 December 2017. Scarlett is Luke Morgan's (Gary Lucy) estranged wife, who left him because of his drinking problems. The character is first mentioned in October 2017 and it is revealed that Scarlett left Luke after he struggled with alcoholism and became erratic. Scarlett made her last appearance on 18 April 2018. In February 2022, it was confirmed that Amy would be reprising her role as Scarlett as part of an "explosive" guest return.

Luke prepares to marry Mandy Richardson (Sarah Jayne Dunn) and asks lawyer Sami Maalik (Rishi Nair) to track down Scarlett so they can arrange a divorce. Scarlett appears in the village in the days before Luke and Mandy's wedding. Luke tries to stall the wedding after learning about Scarlett's appearance. Scarlett tries to ruin the wedding but her and Luke's son, Oliver Morgan (Aedan Duckworth), arrives and reveals to Mandy that he is Luke's son and that Luke and Scarlett are married. After the wedding, Scarlett leaves but returns when Oliver runs away to the village. She is shocked to discover that Oliver wants to stay with Luke and leaves the village.

== Oliver Morgan ==
Oliver Morgan
- Hollyoaks character
- Portrayed by: Aedan Duckworth (2018–2020); Gabriel Clark (2020–2023)
- Duration: 2018–2023
- First appearance: Episode 4826; 22 January 2018
- Last appearance: Episode 6148; 5 July 2023
- Introduced by: Bryan Kirkwood
In-universe information
- Occupation: Burger chef
- Father: Luke Morgan
- Mother: Scarlett Morgan
- Stepmother: Mandy Richardson
- Half-brothers: DJ
- Sons: Thierry
- Grandfathers: Andy Morgan
- Grandmothers: Sue Morgan
- Uncles: Adam Morgan
- Aunts: Zara Morgan; Beth Morgan

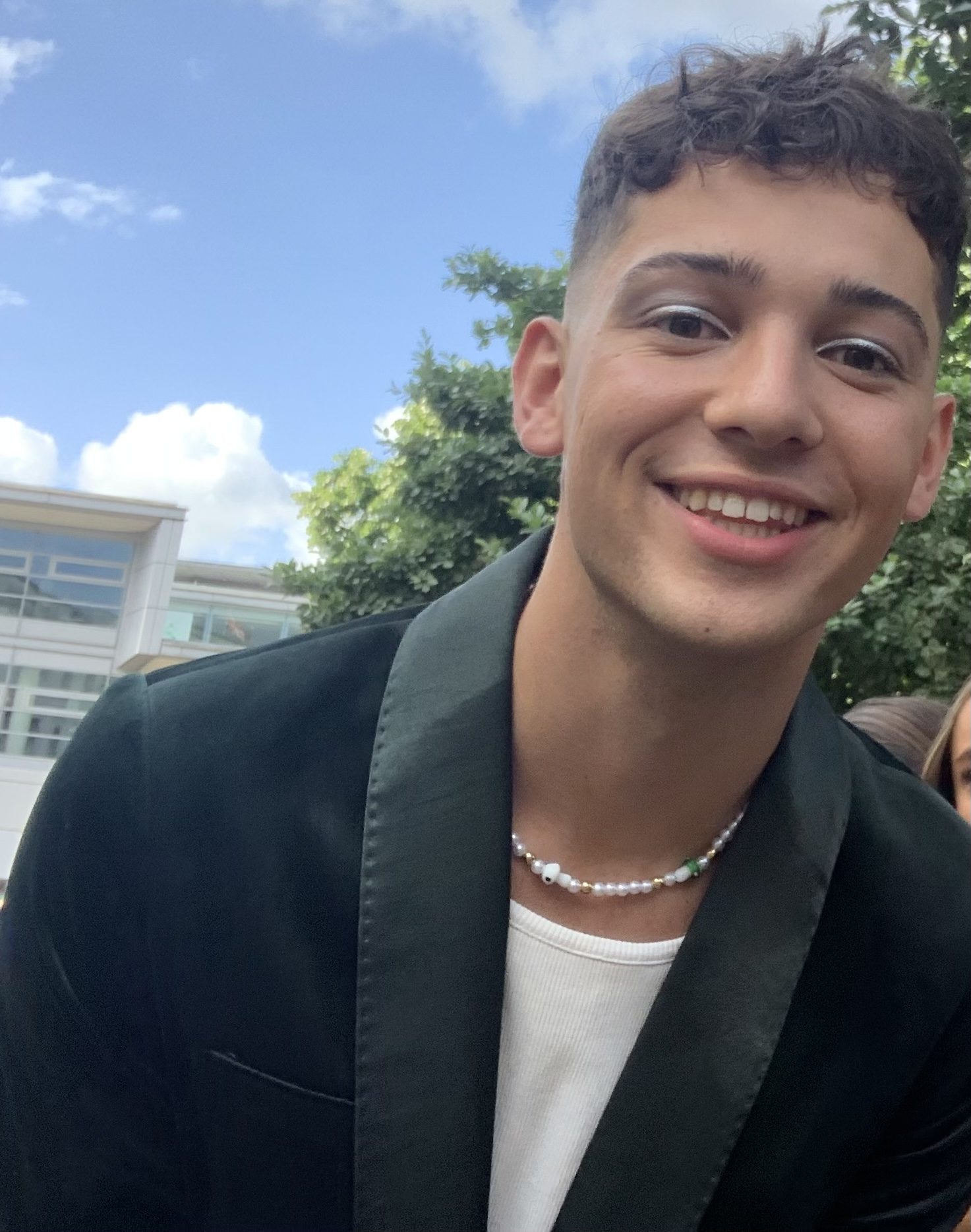
Gabriel Clark portrayed the role of Oliver from 2020 to 2023.

Oliver Morgan made his first screen appearance on 22 January 2018. The character had previously been mentioned on-screen, but Aedan Duckworth's casting in the role was announced on 6 December 2017. Oliver is Luke Morgan (Gary Lucy) and Scarlett Morgan's (Susie Amy) son. Details of why Oliver comes to the village were not immediately released, but Daniel Kilkely of Digital Spy reported that "with Oliver now a teenager, he's sure to want answers from his dad." Of his casting, Duckworth said: "I started two weeks ago and it was in at the deep end – I had to spend my whole second day crying! It has been fantastic working with Gary Lucy and Susie Amy and I am looking forward getting to work with more of the cast and settling in properly next year." Duckworth vacated the role in 2020 and the character was recast with Gabriel Clark, who debuted in November 2020.

It was announced on 25 March 2018 that Oliver would feature in a sexual abuse storyline with his football coach, Buster Smith (Nathan Sussex). The storyline, which was billed as "an emotional and challenging story", began in April when Oliver confides in Buster over his home life. Hollyoaks worked with the Survivors Manchester charity for the storyline. Charity founder Duncan Craig described the subject as "so topical and relevant" and "hugely important". He stated that the storyline would focus on details of grooming and Oliver's struggle to tell someone about the issue. Duckworth took support from the charity and Lucy while filming the storyline and felt honoured to be handed the story. Duckworth and executive producer Bryan Kirkwood hoped that the storyline would encourage others to seek support. Kirkwood also wanted to encourage parents to speak to their children about topics like this and commented, "We are in a unique position of being able to talk to a bright and engaged audience about important issues without lecturing them."

=== Reception ===
For his portrayl of Oliver, Duckworth was nominated for Best Soap Newcomer at the 2018 Digital Spy Reader Awards; he came in fourth place with 9.4% of the total votes. The following year, Duckworth received his first National Television Awards nomination in the Newcomer category for his portrayal of Oliver.

=== Storylines ===
Oliver first appears when he crashes his dad Luke Morgan's (Gary Lucy) wedding to Mandy Richardson (Sarah Jayne Dunn) and reveals that he is Luke's son and that Luke is still married to Scarlett Morgan (Susie Amy), who was Luke's previous wife and Oliver's mother. Oliver and Luke bond after the wedding. The following day, Oliver appears at Luke's house and asks to stay with him. Luke agrees and is surprised to discover that Oliver has run away from Scarlett. When Scarlett returns and tries to take Oliver back to their home, Oliver insists to Scarlett that he wants to remain with Luke so Scarlett tearfully leaves the village. Oliver joins the football academy run by Buster Smith (Nathan Sussex) a former football champion player from back in the day from when he was much younger back then. Over the next few weeks, Oliver becomes closer to Buster confiding in him over situations in his home life such as his discovery that his father had been raped when he was younger after being told this by friend and also a member of Buster's football academy Imran Maalik (Ijaz Rana). Oliver has also been confiding in Buster and putting all of his trust in him such as telling Buster about his biological dad and new stepmum Mandy always arguing day in and day out and his dad turning back to the drink again after being an alcoholic before.

It is revealed on-screen that Buster is a paedophile who groomed and sexually abused his son Damon Kinsella's (Jacob Roberts) best friend, Brody Hudson (Adam Woodward), when he was an underage teenager. After Oliver is injured while playing a game of football with Buster outside of the Bean Cafe, Buster takes him back to the changing rooms at the football academy and begins massaging his leg while also staring at Oliver lustfully. A few weeks later, when Oliver and Buster are alone together in the changing rooms at the football academy, Buster is telling Oliver about his potential when Oliver's leg injury comes back and Buster tells him to lie down on the bench so he can then properly examine it and shuts the door behind them. Oliver then runs out of the changing rooms scared and confused, and although it is not specified on screen, it is implied that Buster has touched Oliver inappropriately. Oliver becomes traumatised but because of Luke's continued drinking, he feels that he cannot tell anyone so quits the football team instead but is convinced to re-join the football team again by Luke. Buster begins manipulating Oliver by telling him that he must prove to him of how much that he truly wants to be back on the football team again.

Oliver meets autistic teenager Brooke Hathaway (Tylan Grant) and develops an instant attraction with the two hitting it off at the Bean. Brooke later comes to watch Oliver play but after he underperforms, Buster takes him to the changing rooms at the football academy to berate him for being distracted today. He puts his hand on Oliver's knee inappropriately, which is witnessed secretly by Brooke. Oliver feels uncomfortable with Buster doing this to him and he rushes out of the football academy to get away from Buster. Oliver and Mandy run into Brooke the next day with Nancy Osborne (Jessica Fox) and Mandy teases that Oliver likes Brooke. Brooke then responds that Oliver is gay, as they have misinterpreted what they saw between Buster and Oliver, with Brooke unaware that Buster is actually grooming Oliver. Oliver then shouts at Brooke causing them to have a breakdown after Oliver leaves. When he returns home, Mandy tries to get Oliver to open up to her but before he can say anything, they are interrupted by a drunken Luke. Oliver starts berating his father and stepmother before storming out of the house upset. Oliver then talks to Buster alone in the football academy changing rooms as he didn't know who else to turn to. Buster then manipulates the vulnerable teen by saying to Oliver that he can make him a star footballer with Buster's coaching skills as long as he does everything that he's told. He then places his hand on Oliver's knee inappropriately once again. He then asks Oliver if he understands or not. Oliver then tells him that he does understand before Buster shuts the door behind them to continue his abuse of Oliver. Buster gives Oliver a mobile phone and tells Oliver to text him at any time about anything. Buster then tells him not to tell anyone else about it and Oliver agrees.

As Buster's sexual abuse continues, Oliver confesses to Scott Drinkwell (Ross Adams) that he is confused about his sexuality. He tells Scott that he knows that he likes girls but he also thinks that he might be gay and has been aggressively trying to pursue Brooke in order to cover it up. Scott is sympathetic with him and encourages him to talk to Luke about it. Oliver is unable to go through with it and accidentally tells Luke that Scott has been harassing him instead. After Luke confronts Scott, Luke warns him to stay away from his teenage son for now on with him thinking that Scott is being inappropriate with him due to Oliver being underage. Oliver tries to apologise to Scott but when Scott tells him that he has to deal with his sexuality rather than ignore it though, Oliver is homophobic towards Scott and runs away. Buster lies to Oliver by telling him that Scott has agreed to let Oliver be the poster boy for the Bean. Buster takes several intimate photographs of Oliver when they're alone together at the football academy changing rooms, which he later confesses to Luke. As Luke is drunk at the time, Oliver makes him promise to wait until he is sober before confronting Buster. The next morning, Luke cannot remember what Oliver had said to him. Buster later convinces Oliver that telling Luke anything will put unnecessary pressure on his dad, so Oliver agrees to keep quiet but later steals a bottle of wine and begins drinking in secret. Brody later convinces Oliver to report Buster to the police and he is arrested. Buster pleads not guilty at the hearing. During Buster's trial, Oliver is ripped to pieces by Buster's defence team and because of this, he agrees that Brooke would not be able to cope giving evidence. Imran reveals that Buster attempted to sexually assault him in Barcelona, shocking everybody. Buster is found guilty and is sentenced to six years in prison. Oliver and Brooke begin dating after almost sharing a kiss. Brooke becomes pregnant and whilst Oliver is excited, Brooke does not feel ready so they arrange for the baby's adoption. Brooke later gives birth to a son, Thierry.

After confronting Buster, Ollie abruptly leaves the village, leaving a note for Luke and Cindy. Ollie returns, played by Gabriel Clark, suffering from a ketamine addiction and subsequently has sex with Juliet, resulting in him and Brooke ending their relationship. His addiction leads him to steal from his family and friends and eventually to the apparent death of Sid Sumner (Billy Price). Following Sid's death, Ollie becomes homeless and selle drugs for Victor Brothers (Benjamin O'Mahony). Ollie and Ste Hay (Kieron Richardson) work together to bring down Victor, resulting in a showdown between Ollie and Victor where Ste fakes his death and Victor is arrested. Ollie then becomes homeless again and goes missing. Luke finds him on his 18th birthday, living in a garden centre. In a special mental health episode, Ollie and Luke have a heart to heart which results in Ollie deciding to go to a rehab centre. On the scenes, Clark commented that he "felt really pleased when I read the script and saw how it was being approached. The format of a continuing drama means that we've been able to gradually, and responsibly, build to this story over months of episodes and it means so much to me to be able to tell it." At the end of the week, Ollie leaves the village for rehab. Clark confirmed his return to the show, saying "the next time you see Ollie after this week you're definitely in for a surprise!" He said he "would really like to explore Ollie's love life and also explore what direction he wants to take his future in."

Two years later, Clark confirmed that he would be leaving Hollyoaks, with his final scenes airing on 8 July 2022. Leaving the soap made him sad but he was excited to pursue new projects, specifically in theatre. He likened his own feelings to those of Ollie's, and explained: "I feel like Ollie does when he steps into that cab: optimistic, nervous, and excited – knowing I've made the right decision but not sure where the future is going to take me. But whatever happens, I'm going to embrace it like he would, with a big smile on my face, hope in my heart, and the love of all of those people from Hollyoaks. That will always be with me, wherever I go." Ollie returned briefly for Juliet's funeral after she dies of cancer. He visits her grave to say goodbye to her.

== Jay Johnson ==
Jay Johnson
- Hollyoaks character
- Portrayed by: Michael Dixon
- First appearance: Episode 4880; 30 March 2018
- Last appearance: Episode 5020; 15 October 2018
- Introduced by: Bryan Kirkwood
In-universe information
- Occupation: Gangster; Drug Dealer

Jay Johnson, portrayed by Michael Dixon, was a criminal associate of Glenn Donovan (Bob Cryer), who threatens to stop purchasing drugs from Glenn after his employee, Shane Sweeney (Michael Salami), confesses to the murders of Trigger (Adam Sina) and D.S. Geoff Thorpe (James Bradshaw). Glenn tries persuading Jay to stay and when Jay sees Glenn's partner, Grace Black (Tamara Wall), flirting with Farrah Maalik (Krupa Pattani), Jay agrees to continue business with Glenn on the condition that he can have sex with Grace. As they prepare to have sex, Glenn records them and blackmails Jay into returning to business with him; Jay lies to Glenn that Grace wanted to have sex with him. Jay later informs Glenn that someone has reported him to the police and when Glenn murders his son, Adam Donovan (Jimmy Essex, Jay congratulates him.

Glenn tells Grace that Jay killed Adam, so she tries to kill Jay. When Courtney Campbell (Amy Conachan) delivers Jay some impure drugs under Glenn's instruction, Jay threatens to harm her boyfriend, Jesse Donovan (Luke Jerdy). Jay later agrees to help Glenn hijack an ATM van, but when he spots Grace speaking with D.S. Roxy Cassidy (Lizzie Stavrou), he confronts her; she explains that Glenn has been emotionally abusing her and wants revenge, so he agrees to perform the robbery and kill Glenn. As Jay prepares to shoot Glenn, he is murdered by Glenn's son, Liam Donovan (Jude Monk McGowan).

== Buster Smith ==
Buster Smith
- Hollyoaks character
- Portrayed by: Nathan Sussex
- Duration: 2018–2021
- First appearance: Episode 4831; 29 January 2018
- Last appearance: Episode 5637; 20 July 2021
- Introduced by: Bryan Kirkwood
In-universe information
- Wife: Maggie Kinsella (backstory)
- Sons: Damon Kinsella

Buster Smith, played by Nathan Sussex, made his first screen appearance on 29 January 2018. The character and Sussex's casting details were announced on 23 January 2018. Buster is the father of Damon Kinsella (Jacob Roberts) and arrives following the death of his former wife and Damon's mother, Maggie Kinsella (Michelle Holmes). Buster is described as "quite a charming character", who gets along with everyone. Roberts said that Buster enjoys "a laugh and a joke". Roberts expressed his delight at the expansion of his on-screen family and praised Sussex, commenting, "He's already part of the Hollyoaks family!"

With a winning smile and a wardrobe full of designer clothes, Buster Smith is one flash character here to bring a touch of fame to Hollyoaks. Having travelled the world and lived the high life, Buster's a salt of the earth Salford lad, made good. With dazzling banter, he can charm even the coldest of customers.

— An excerpt from Buster's profile on the official Hollyoaks website.

Damon, Scott Drinkwell (Ross Adams) and Brody Hudson (Adam Woodward) call a number on Maggie's bucket list and are shocked when Buster answers and walks into The Dog in the Pond pub. Buster is estranged from Damon following Maggie throwing him out for adultery and then his decision to concentrate on his professional football career rather than his family. On Buster and Damon's relationship, Sussex said, "there is an instant connection there between father and son." Damon knows very little about his father and the lack of contact between them has made Damon believe that Buster does not care for him.

It was announced on 25 March 2018 that Buster would feature in a sexual abuse storyline with his football student, Oliver Morgan (Aedan Duckworth). The storyline, which is billed as "an emotional and challenging story", begins in April when Oliver confides in Buster over his home life. Hollyoaks worked with the Survivors Manchester charity for the storyline. Charity founder Duncan Craig described the subject as "so topical and relevant" and "hugely important". He stated that the storyline would focus on details of grooming and Oliver's struggle to tell someone about the issue. Executive producer Bryan Kirkwood hoped that the storyline would encourage others to seek support. He also wanted to encourage parents to speak to their children about topics like this and commented, "We are in a unique position of being able to talk to a bright and engaged audience about important issues without lecturing them."

Buster first arrives in the village shortly after the death of his ex-wife, Maggie, to see their son, Damon. Maggie had thrown Buster out after his numerous affairs and he missed out on most of Damon's life. Damon's girlfriend, Holly Cunningham (Amanda Clapham), convinces Damon to give his father a chance and they agree to re-build their father-son relationship. Damon's longtime best friend, Brody, is not happy to see Buster and it's clear that there is bad blood between them. Buster begins dating Marnie Nightingale (Lysette Anthony) and moves into the flat above The Dog in the Pond public house with her, her children Alfie (Richard Linnell) and Ellie (Sophie Porley), as well as Damon and Brody. Buster decides to set up his own football academy for teenagers. Many local kids, including Oliver and Imran Maalik (Ijaz Rana), sign up. Oliver confides in Buster about how difficult his home life is due to his father, Luke Morgan (Gary Lucy), having a drinking problem and constantly arguing with his wife, Mandy (Sarah Jayne Dunn). Buster tells Oliver he can trust him with anything. Brody confides in Oliver's mother, Scarlett Morgan (Susie Amy), that someone he trusted abused him when he was young and it is obvious he is referring to Buster. It becomes clear then that Buster is not just being friendly to Oliver — he is grooming him so he can sexually abuse him.

As part of his grooming, Buster gives Oliver special attention and makes him team captain. One day, Buster is giving Oliver a sports massage and sexually abuses him for the first time. Oliver is upset after the incident, but Buster convinces him that he misinterpreted what happened. Buster abuses Oliver again under the guise of a massage, which causes Oliver to quit the team. Buster convinces Oliver to rejoin the team and continues to abuse him. Buster has Oliver pose for photos without his clothes on. Luke discovers the photos and when he asks Oliver about them, he points the finger at Scott. Brody suspects Buster is the real culprit and confronts him about abusing him as a child. It comes out that Maggie found out about Buster abusing Brody and that is actually why she threw him out. Oliver tells the police it was actually Buster who abused him and he is arrested. In January 2019, Buster was found guilty, he was sentenced six years in prison for abusing Oliver. He appears again in September 2020, when Brody and Ollie visit him in the hopes of receiving an apology; however, Buster refuses to apologise and stands by his actions.

== Theo Jones ==
Theo Jones
- Hollyoaks character
- Portrayed by: Matt Kennard
- First appearance: Episode 4885; 13 April 2018
- Last appearance: Episode 4907; 15 May 2018
- Introduced by: Bryan Kirkwood
In-universe information
- Brothers: Milo Entwistle

Theo Jones, played by Matt Kennard, made his first on-screen appearance on 13 April 2018. The character was announced on 3 April 2018, while the casting details were confirmed on 6 April 2018. It was initially reported that Theo has a connection to established character, Milo Entwistle (Nathan Morris). On 10 April 2018, it was confirmed that Theo and Milo are brothers. Kennard describes Theo as a bad character, calling him "a bitter, seemingly irredeemable bully." He stated that Theo is a womaniser who only cares about himself. However, he explained that Theo's personality is due to recent events in his life.

Daniel Kilkelly of Digital Spy said that Milo would be "a little bit rattled" by Theo's arrival. He reported that despite Milo receiving a phone call from Theo and arranging to meet him, Theo would first appear when he meets Cindy Cunningham (Stephanie Waring) at The Loft nightclub. Kennard stated that Theo flirts with Cindy because he noticed her first, otherwise he suspected that he could have flirted with Cindy's daughter, Holly Cunningham (Amanda Clapham). Kennard admitted that Theo grows to enjoy Cindy's company. He added, "any beautiful woman offering something to Theo will make do in the short-term."

When Theo meets with Milo, he orders money from Milo in exchange for his silence about Milo killing Cindy's parents. Kennard explained that Theo is in need of money and decides to "callously take advantage of Milo's vulnerable situation". Theo decides to stay with Milo because he realises that Milo is "his best bet in the immediate circumstances". Milo is scared of Theo because he knows about his secret. On Theo's feelings towards Milo, Kennard explained, "Theo holds a raw and irrational hatred for Milo, and feels Milo owes him more than he can ever actually give." Theo made his last appearance on 15 May 2018.

== Harley Frater ==
Harley Frater, played by Mollie Lambert, made her first on screen appearance on 16 April 2018. The character and Lambert's casting details were announced on 10 April 2018. Harley is a homeless girl who is introduced as part of Peri Lomax's (Ruby O'Donnell) homelessness storyline. She is billed as courageous and daring and in "desperate need of some home comforts". Hollyoaks worked with homeless charities Centrepoint and The Whitechapel Centre for Harley and Peri's storyline. Lambert looked forward to joining the show and called it an honour to work with the charities. She hoped that the storyline would help to raise awareness for homelessness.

== Ron ==
Ron
- Hollyoaks character
- Portrayed by: Peter Ash
- First appearance: 20 April 2018
- Last appearance: 22 August 2018
- Introduced by: Bryan Kirkwood
In-universe information
- Occupation: Homeless

Ron, played by Peter Ash, is a homeless man who homeless Harley Frater (Mollie Lambert) occasionally has sex with so that she has a bed for the night. Following the death of Harley's friend, Dean (Alfie Kingsnorth), Harley contacts Ron; Harley's friend, Peri Lomax (Ruby O'Donnell), dislikes the situation and offers Harley the opportunity to come home with her instead. Ron tracks down Harley, but she rejects his offer to come back with him.

However, after Leela Lomax (Kirsty-Leigh Porter) accidentally ruins Harley's coat, she leaves the Lomax household and returns to Ron. When Harley later flees from him, Ron follows her back and confronts her and Peri; Breda McQueen (Moya Brady) interrupts them, allowing Peri and Harley to run away. Ron threatens Breda and demands money from her in exchange for staying away from Harley; Breda gives Ron the money, but when it becomes clear that he will not hold up his end of the deal, Breda sends her son, Sylver McQueen (David Tag), to threaten Ron and return Breda's money.

Reflecting on his stint on the soap, Ash told Inside Soap in 2019, "That was great fun, I had a really nice little part – even though I was playing a horrible person! My character was taking advantage of homeless girl Harley Frater and supplying her drugs, so he wasn't very nice. But the Hollyoaks team was really lovely. I worked a lot alongside Mollie Lambert, who played Harley, and she was absolutely cracking."

== Josh Bradley ==
Josh Bradley
- Hollyoaks character
- Portrayed by: Rupert Hill
- First appearance: 25 April 2018
- Last appearance: 22 June 2018
- Introduced by: Bryan Kirkwood
In-universe information
- Occupation: Police officer
- Father: Ben Bradley
- Stepmother: Sadie Bradley; Sienna Blake
- Sisters: Carly Bradley; Nico Blake (adoptive)
- Half-brothers: Ryan Bradley; Taylor Bradley

Josh Bradley, played by Rupert Hill, made his first on screen appearance on 25 April 2018. The character and casting was announced on 24 April 2018, but had been hinted at in previous episodes. Josh is the son of former character Ben Bradley (Ben Richards), and meets with Sienna Blake (Anna Passey) in The Hutch when she seeks his father's help in her ongoing stalker ordeal. Josh is filled with resentment towards Sienna, because of Ben being sent to jail after Sienna's daughter, Nico Blake (Persephone Swales-Dawson) killed Trevor Royle (Greg Wood). Josh made his last appearance on 22 June 2018.

When Sienna smells gas, Josh opens the windows and implores Sienna to take her young son Sebastian Blake out of the flat. He later phones the emergency services. After the gas issue is resolved, Josh tells Sienna that he still cannot stand the sight of her. Josh later informs Joel Dexter (Rory Douglas-Speed), Myra McQueen (Nicole Barber-Lane), Maxine Minniver (Nikki Sanderson) and Grace Black (Tamara Wall) that Sienna has died after being stabbed by Nico. Josh tells Myra and Joel that they plan to use Sienna's funeral to catch Nico. It is revealed that Sienna isn't dead and is working with Josh to catch Nico. Josh later arrests Sienna after she admits to killing Nico.

== Tori Devine-Banks ==
Tori Devine-Banks
- Hollyoaks character
- Portrayed by: Uncredited (2018); Harriet O’Shea (2025–present)
- Duration: 2018, 2025–present
- First appearance: Episode 4937; 20 June 2018
- Introduced by: Bryan Kirkwood (2018); Hannah Cheers (2025)
In-universe information
- Mother: Nico Blake
- Adoptive father: DI Alistair Banks
- Adoptive mother: Clare Devine
- Grandfathers: Dodger Savage; Fraser Black (adoptive)
- Grandmothers: Sienna Blake; Tracey Donovan (adoptive)
- Uncles: Sebastian Blake; Liam Donovan (adoptive); Adam Donovan (adoptive); Jesse Donovan (adoptive); Rex Gallagher (adoptive); Ro Hutchinson (adoptive)
- Aunts: Myra-Pocahontas Savage-McQueen; Sophie Blake; Grace Black (adoptive); Dee Dee Hutchinson (adoptive)
- First cousins: Rex Gallagher (adoptive); Curtis Royle (adoptive); Iona Campbell (adoptive)
- Other relatives: Martha Blake; Patrick Blake; Jeremy Blake; Anna Blake; Liberty Savage; Dilly Harcourt; Faith Hudson-Savage; Froggy Black (adoptive)

Tori Devine-Banks (also Victoria Blake) is the daughter of Nico Blake (Persephone Swales-Dawson). She makes her first appearance in episode 4937, originally broadcast on 20 June 2018. Nico plots murder on Peri Lomax (Ruby O'Donnell), making Nico's mother, Sienna Blake (Anna Passey), worry that Victoria's life could also be in danger. She asks Joel Dexter (Rory Douglas-Speed) to save Victoria; Nico is furious when she discovers this and attacks Sienna. As Nico attempts to kill her, Sienna kills her, leaving Victoria orphaned; she is then taken into care. Sarah Ellis from Inside Soap wrote that she believed that Victoria would be "much better off without a mum like Nico!"

The character will return to the series in 2025. Upon her return Tori will be under the guardianship of DI Alistair Banks (Drew Cain) and Clare Devine (Gemma Bissix). Bissix later confirmed that Clare adopted Tori and added that she has only been living with Clare for two years upon her return. She added that Clare behaves like "a normal mother" towards Tori.

== Breda McQueen ==
Breda McQueen
- Hollyoaks character
- Portrayed by: Moya Brady
- Duration: 2018–2020
- First appearance: 26 June 2018
- Last appearance: 7 January 2020
- Introduced by: Bryan Kirkwood
- Spin-off appearances: Hollyoaks Later (2020)
In-universe information
- Occupation: Nanny
- Family: McQueen
- Mother: Marguerite McQueen
- Brothers: Victor McQueen
- Sisters: Valene McQueen
- Husband: Vinnie Bletcher (backstory)
- Daughters: Goldie McQueen
- Adoptive sons: Sylver McQueen
- Grandsons: Prince McQueen; Hunter McQueen
- Granddaughters: Cher Winters (adoptive)
- Aunts: Marlena McQueen
- Nephews: Bart McQueen
- First cousins: Kathleen McQueen; Myra McQueen; Reenie McQueen
- Other relatives: Mercedes McQueen; Cleo McQueen; Max McQueen; Bobby Costello; John Paul McQueen; Matthew McQueen

Breda McQueen, played by Moya Brady, made her first on screen appearance on 26 June 2018. The character was known about in casting references for Sylver McQueen (David Tag), but the character's arrival to the village and casting wasn't announced until 22 June 2018. On 6 January 2020, Breda died in the E4 spinoff series Hollyoaks Later. She was responsible for the deaths of Russ Owen, Glenn Donovan, Carl Costello, Louis Loveday, Mac Nightingale and Harry Thompson.

Breda is a cousin of Myra McQueen (Nicole Barber-Lane) and the mother of Sylver and Goldie (Chelsee Healey). Breda arrives in the village following Sylver's release from prison, and insists that Goldie give him a place to stay. However, when Goldie refuses, Breda resorts to "crafty" measures. On her character, Brady commented that she was a "strong and colourful individual" and that she didn't have "a lot of fear for authority." Brady also said that "Breda comes from the firm but fair school of motherhood," and described her as a "tigress." With Sylver having been in prison, Breda kept tabs on him, but Brady said that Breda doesn't have a favourite child and that as her character becomes more settled in the village, her love for Goldie would shine through.

Arriving in Hollyoaks to stay with the McQueens', Breda began working as a nanny for Leela Lomax (Kirsty-Leigh Porter) – but secretly agreed to "two time" Leela by working for Jack Osborne (Jimmy McKenna) too. Jack tried to cover for Breda by pretending they were in a relationship – much to Leela's amusement. Leela figured it out and allowed Breda to be nanny to both her and Jack. Eventually, Breda's friendship with Jack would turn into a real relationship.

On Mercedes McQueen (Jennifer Metcalfe) and Russ Owen's (Stuart Manning) wedding day in November 2018, it was shockingly revealed that Breda was a serial killer. Breda discovered that Russ had been unfaithful with Goldie, resulting in a pregnancy, and had pressurised her into aborting their child. Enraged, Breda murdered Russ. She is then revealed to have killed Glenn Donovan (Bob Cryer) and Carl Costello (Paul Opacic) for being "sinners" and "dead beat dads". In January 2019 Breda took revenge on Louis Loveday (Karl Collins) for cheating with three women, Leela, Simone Loveday (Jacqueline Boatswain) and Simone's sister, Martine Deveraux (Kéllé Bryan) pushing some shelving onto him as he called for a taxi to leave town. Breda moved Louis to an old pig farm once owned by her parents making out she was caring for him and took him there to recover, Louis discovered Breda was responsible for the deaths of Carl, Glenn and Russ whilst writing a letter to Simone and attempted to escape but was thwarted when Breda returned to the farm. She puts him back into bed and believes him when he says it's Leela he wants to be with, Breda makes tea and as she strips the bed Louis switches the cups which Breda notices, just then Simone arrives at the farm calling for Breda, before Louis can react Breda smothers him keeping him from shouting to Simone. Breda goes to Simone and gets a lift to the village, meanwhile, Louis escapes and Breda finds him hiding in the barn. She says she's going to make some tea but then spots the letter confessing to the murders that Louis found. Louis begs for his life but Breda kills him by bludgeoning him with a telephone. She returns to Leela telling her to move on. Later at the farm Breda burns Louis' clothes and mobile phone in a metal canister. When she leaves a mysterious hooded figure takes Louis's phone and removes the sim card. The hooded figure is later revealed as Mac Nightingale (David Easter), who begins to blackmail Breda. He orders her to murder his son James Nightingale (Gregory Finnegan), much to her reluctance. Eventually, she slips poison into his coffee, and James collapses on a park bench. She later bakes a lasagne, which Mac eats in celebration, but is stunned to realise Breda has poisoned that, too. She reveals James will be fine, and she always intended to kill Mac, who in a weakened state tries to attack her but she kills him by hitting him with the lasagne dish. In July 2019, it is revealed that it was Breda who killed Vinnie, not Sylver, as he survived the fall, but Breda finished him off, and let Sylver take the blame. Later in the month, Breda planned to kill Tony Hutchinson (Nick Pickard) after he confessed his past mistakes to her but Breda did not kill him, after learning Harry Thompson (Parry Glasspool) was going on the run. Breda fatally stabs Harry in an alleyway believing he was a bad dad for abandoning his son Isaac. Harry then died as a result of his injuries. Tony later discovers that Breda killed his son and she stabs Tony in the stomach. It was later revealed that Breda was keeping Tony prisoner at the pig farm.

In October 2019, Breda's family begin to get suspicious of where she is going all the time. Goldie learns she's going to the pig farm and Breda lies that she is mentally ill. Breda pretends to have dementia, but when Goldie finds her at the pig farm again and finds Harry's wallet there, Breda confesses to killing Harry. She blames it on her "dementia" and Goldie agrees to keep it a secret. Breda's killing spree comes to an end when Sylver, Goldie and Mercedes and John Paul McQueen (James Sutton) all find out her serial killer secret. Mercedes finds Tony at the pig farm but Breda sneaks up and attacks her, after stabbing Tony again and locking Mercedes in the cage too, which she and Tony eventually escape from. After a heated confrontation in the house, Breda shoots Sylver with a bolt gun and sets the pig farm on fire. Mercedes stops Breda from killing her and Sylver as the house burns, the two of them fight, as Breda attacks Mercedes with a shard of glass Sylver uses his last ounce of strength to stab Breda in the head with two knitting needles, killing her instantly.

== Sylver McQueen ==
Sylver McQueen
- Hollyoaks character
- Portrayed by: David Tag
- Duration: 2018–2022, 2026
- First appearance: 27 June 2018
- Last appearance: 18 February 2026
- Introduced by: Bryan Kirkwood (2018); Hannah Cheers (2026)
- Spin-off appearances: Hollyoaks Later (2020)
In-universe information
- Other names: Peter Leilis
- Family: McQueen
- Father: Wes
- Mother: Harriet Leilis
- Adoptive father: Vinnie
- Adoptive mother: Breda McQueen
- Sisters: Goldie McQueen (adoptive)
- Wife: Mercedes McQueen (2019–2022)
- Daughters: Cher Winters
- Adoptive sons: Bobby Costello
- Nephews: Prince McQueen (adoptive); Hunter McQueen (adoptive)

Sylvester "Sylver" McQueen, played by David Tag, made his first on screen appearance on 27 June 2018. The character and Tag's casting details were announced on 22 May 2018. Tag previously appeared in the series as PCSO Rocco in May 2016. Sylver is a member of the established McQueen family and the half-brother of Goldie McQueen (Chelsee Healey). His backstory states that he was raised on a farm by their Catholic mother, Breda (Moya Brady), and his stepfather, Vinnie, who was abusive. He was sentenced to prison after murdering Vinnie. Sylver arrives after being released from prison and quickly clashes with Goldie. Justin Harp, reporting for Digital Spy, suggested that Sylver would have a love interest.

In a later interview, Tag said that his character was "calm in nature" until something "hits a button or triggers him off. Tag said that Sylver's time in prison has turned him into a "workout fanatic" and also made him deal quickly with any problems that he faces, saying that the "experiences have made him into quite a well-rounded person.

Sylver arrives in Hollyoaks upon his release from prison, having served eighteen years for killing his abusive stepfather, Vinnie. He is eager to reunite with his half-sister Goldie but she is reluctant to embrace because he killed her father. However she comes around after understanding that it was a case of self-defence. Sylver is shown to have a history with village resident Simone Loveday (Jacqueline Boatswain), who was the lawyer that failed to get Sylver off during his murder trial and Sylver still holds some resentment towards her. On 12 January 2022, Sylver died following an explosion in the Pateserie, Bobby being a huge factor of his death by not telling people where he was. On 20 January 2026 it was announced that Sylver would be making a one off special return in a McQueen "what if" sernario regarding the exit of John Paul McQueen.

== Kameela ==
Kameela
- Hollyoaks character
- Portrayed by: Anu Hasan
- Duration: 2018–2019, 2022
- First appearance: 29 June 2018
- Last appearance: 18 February 2022
In-universe information
- Sisters: Misbah Maalik; Hasina
- Nephews: Imran Maalik
- Nieces: Farrah Maalik; Yasmine Maalik

Kameela, played by Anu Hasan, made her first appearance on 29 June 2018. The character was announced on 17 June 2018. Kameela is billed as the "judgemental" sister of Misbah Maalik (Harvey Virdi) who is not afraid of "speaking her mind". Kameela arrives when she visits her family and after discovering that Misbah's underage son, Imran Maalik (Ijaz Rana), has bought alcohol, she criticises Misbah's liberalism in raising her children. Hasan pointed out that her character initially appears "extremely critical" of the family. Kameela appears again in the episode broadcast on 17 September 2018.

The character returns in March 2019 as part of a special episode focusing on radicalisation. The episode features a far-right group with an anti-Muslim agenda, and a discussion involving Kameela about the meaning of being a British Muslim. Hollyoaks worked with the charity Small Steps and the Home Office on the episode. Executive producer Bryan Kirkwood also expressed his delight about the episode. Upon her return, Kameela's characterisation has developed and she is friendlier towards the family. Hasan explained that the change in Kameela's personality occurs following a change in her personal life. The actress also commented, "Aunty Kameela still thinks she knows best and can be quite interfering and bossy, but she does it in a much nicer way."

== Kashif Maalik ==
Kashif Maalik
- Hollyoaks character
- Portrayed by: Nitin Patel
- Appears on: 2 July 2018
- Introduced by: Bryan Kirkwood
In-universe information
- Occupation: Accountant
- Father: Sayid Maalik
- Mother: Haseena Maalik
- Brothers: Dabir Maalik; Tariq Maalik
- Wife: Sheeba Desai (backstory); Misbah Maalik (backstory)
- Sons: Sami Maalik; Imran Maalik
- Daughters: Farrah Maalik; Yasmine Maalik

Kashif Maalik, played by Nitin Patel, appeared on 2 July 2018. Kashif is the husband of Misbah Maalik (Harvey Virdi) and the father of Sami Maalik (Rishi Nair), Farrah Maalik (Krupa Pattani), Yasmine Maalik (Haiesha Mistry) and Imran Maalik (Ijaz Rana). The character was referenced to by his family on multiple occasions since their arrival in 2017. In October 2017, details about the character were explored. It was established that Kashif had been charged with embezzlement and committed suicide while in prison. Nair explained that Sami believes that he is innocent, but Misbah disagrees and it creates tension between the pair. It is later revealed that James Nightingale (Gregory Finnegan) was the actual embezzler and framed Kashif.

On 29 June 2018, it was announced that Kashif would feature in a flashback episode focusing on James's backstory. The episode was previously announced on 20 June, but Kashif's appearance was not revealed until later.

In flashbacks, it is seen that Kashif was an accountant at the law firm of Forbes and Carney. He is friendly to James and helps him settle in on his first day. James embezzles money from the company under pressure from his father, Mac Nightingale (David Easter). Kashif overhears Mac belittling James and tries to comfort him. James tells Kashif to back off and has him sign a document in order to frame him for the embezzlement. Weeks later, the police come into the office and arrest Kashif.

== Donna-Marie Quinn ==
Donna-Marie Quinn
- Hollyoaks character
- Portrayed by: Lucy-Jo Hudson
- Duration: 2018–2023
- First appearance: 2 July 2018
- Last appearance: 15 September 2023
- Introduced by: Bryan Kirkwood
In-universe information
- Occupation: Prostitute
- Sons: Romeo Nightingale
- Daughters: Juliet Nightingale

Donna-Marie Quinn, played by Lucy-Jo Hudson, made her first on screen appearance on 2 July 2018. Hudson's casting details were announced on 5 May 2018, when it was revealed that she had been cast in a "decent part", and her character was announced on 22 May 2018. Donna-Marie is billed as a "reckless woman" with a distressing backstory, she has worked as prostitute and has issues with drug addiction. She is introduced with her teenage son, Romeo Quinn (Owen Warner). The character first appeared in flashbacks; seventeen years earlier, she was paid by Mac Nightingale (David Easter) to have sex with his sixteen-year-old son James Nightingale (Gregory Finnegan), resulting in the birth of Romeo. Hudson filmed an exit from the series in January 2019 and Donna-Marie departs the series in the episode originally broadcast on 26 April 2019. In October 2019, Hudson was spotted by paparazzi returning to the set of Hollyoaks, sparking rumours that she would reprise the role. This was confirmed by a show trailer released on 2 January 2020 and it was revealed that Hudson would appear in a stint as Donna-Marie reunites with her daughter, Juliet Quinn (Niamh Blackshaw). She returned on 16 January 2020.

After her character's backstory was revealed, Hudson confirmed that Donna-Marie and Romeo would move to Hollyoaks village after Romeo decides to search for his father. Laura-Jayne Tyler of Inside Soap predicted that Donna-Marie would create "trouble" for the Nightingale family. Hudson described Donna-Marie as "nasty" and said that "there's not a nice bit in this woman". However, she enjoyed portraying this as it is not her usual character type. She added that she found it challenging.

Donna-Marie is a drug-addicted prostitute who raised her children, Romeo and Juliet, in an unstable home. In flashbacks it is revealed, she was once paid by Mac Nightingale to have sex with his gay son, James, on his sixteenth birthday in order to "turn him straight." James got her pregnant and his mother Marnie (Lysette Anthony) paid her to have an abortion. Donna-Marie did not go through with the abortion and gave birth to Romeo. Years later, Donna-Marie blackmailed Mac and Marnie that she would tell James about Romeo unless they paid her £100,000, which they did. In the present day, Donna-Marie has been kicked out of her flat. Donna-Marie comes face-to-face with the Nightingales again. James tears into Donna-Marie for being a junkie, causing her to seek out drugs and overdose. Mac lets Donna-Marie move into Cindy Cunningham's (Stephanie Waring) house along with Romeo and Juliet. Mac and Donna-Marie switch out Cindy's bipolar medication and trick her into signing over her house to Mac. Cindy is later sectioned. When Mac threatens to throw Donna-Marie out of the house, she reveals he is Juliet's father. After Mac and Donna-Marie's misdeeds are revealed, she flees town. Some time later, James tracks Donna-Marie down and tells her that Romeo has been charged with Mac's murder, unaware that Breda McQueen (Moya Brady) is the real culprit. Donna-Marie agrees to confess to murdering Mac after James promises her she will get bail and he will give her money to start a new life. After she confesses, Donna-Marie is furious to learn James lied and she will not be granted bail. Donna-Marie is then taken away to prison.

In May 2021, scenes depict Juliet receiving texts from an unknown number. She confesses to friend Sid Sumner (Billy Price) that the texts are from Donna-Marie, but states that she wants nothing to do with her. On 25 May 2021, a Hollyoaks trailer showed Donna-Marie's return to the village.

== Romeo Nightingale ==
Romeo Nightingale
- Hollyoaks character
- Portrayed by: Owen Warner; Jude Forsay (flashback)
- Duration: 2018–2024
- First appearance: 2 July 2018
- Last appearance: 11 March 2024
- Introduced by: Bryan Kirkwood
In-universe information
- Other names: Romeo Quinn
- Father: James Nightingale
- Mother: Donna-Marie Quinn
- Stepfather: Ste Hay
- Half-sisters: Juliet Nightingale
- Grandfathers: Mac Nightingale
- Grandmothers: Marnie Nightingale
- Uncles: Alfie Nightingale; Nathan Nightingale
- Aunts: Ellie Nightingale; Juliet Nightingale

Romeo Nightingale (also Quinn), played by Owen Warner, made his first on-screen appearance on 2 July 2018. The character and Warner's casting details were announced on 22 May 2018. Romeo is the son of Donna-Marie Quinn (Lucy-Jo Hudson) and uses petty crime to finance their way of life. Romeo works with Prince McQueen (Malique Thompson-Dwyer) to host "summer rave parties". Justin Harp of Digital Spy predicted that Romeo and Prince's parties would not go well. In the character's first appearance, further details about the character's backstory were revealed. It was revealed that Romeo is the product of paid sex between Donna-Marie and a sixteen-year-old James Nightingale (Gregory Finnegan). Jude Forsey portrays Romeo in a flashback appearance. For his portrayal of Romeo, Warner won the accolade for Best Soap Newcomer at the 2018 Digital Spy Reader Awards.

Romeo was raised by his drug-addicted prostitute mother, Donna-Marie. Romeo was conceived when Donna-Marie was paid by Mac Nightingale (David Easter) to sleep with his gay sixteen-year-old son, James, to "make him straight." Romeo grew up in unsafe, unstable environment and often had to shield himself and his half-sister, Juliet (Niamh Blackshaw), from Donna-Marie's clients. Romeo first appears in a flashback as a young child telling Donna-Marie he wishes he had a father. Romeo arrives in town to meet James, but then decides against it. Romeo meets Lily McQueen (Lauren McQueen) and is instantly attracted to her. Romeo goes into business promoting illegal raves with Lily's husband, Prince.

Romeo finds out James is having an affair with Harry Thompson (Parry Glasspool) and tries to blackmail Harry over it, which leads to him and James finally meeting properly. Romeo agrees to help James ruin Harry's wedding to Ste Hay (Kieron Richardson). James is heartbroken when Harry goes through with the wedding and, in a moment of vulnerability, he comes onto Romeo, who finally has to tell him he is his father. Romeo is devastated when James rejects him. Romeo declares his love for Lily, who admits she has feelings too, but she ultimately decides to stay with Prince. Romeo discovers that Prince has testicular cancer, but is refusing to tell anyone. This damages Lily and Prince's marriage and she sleeps with Romeo. Lily agrees to run away with Romeo, but then she finds out about Prince's condition and she is disgusted to learn Romeo knew about it all along.

Romeo, Donna-Marie, and Romeo's half-sister, Juliet, are invited by Mac to move into Cindy Savage's (Stephanie Waring) house. Romeo is appalled when he discovers that Donna-Marie and Mac have tampered with Cindy's bipolar disorder medication. After Mac ejects Romeo from the house, James offers to let Romeo move in with him and they start building a relationship. After finding out that James broke up with Harry to focus on him, he gives them his blessing to be together. With Prince having left town, Lily and Romeo finally become a proper couple. Prince confronts them about their affair and Lily decides she cannot be with either of them.

Mac is murdered and Romeo becomes a prime suspect. The police discover a vial of poison in Romeo's jacket, which was planted by Mac's murderer, Breda McQueen (Moya Brady). James tells Romeo he has to leave the country. Lily agrees to come with Romeo, but changes her mind after she realises she wants to be with Prince. Lily tragically dies from sepsis, devastating Romeo. Romeo is locked up for Mac's murder, but is later released when Donna-Marie is tricked by James into confessing.

Romeo tries to comfort James when he found out that Harry was murdered, but James hits Romeo. Things gets worse when James began abusing Romeo, and Romeo moved out and secretly stayed in the Maalik's empty household. He was found by Peri Lomax (Ruby O'Donnell), who threatened to tell his grandmother, Marnie Nightingale (Lysette Anthony), but Romeo confess to Peri that James hit him, and the reason why he stayed at the Maalik's.

Peri visits Romeo the next day and told him about the day she found out that her 'parents' are her grandparents, and advices Romeo to keep talking to James. Marnie later finds Romeo, when Peri told Marnie what had happened. Marnie reasons with Romeo that James had regretted for what he did and Marnie takes Romeo home, only to find James about to attack Juliet. Romeo comforts James when he, Juliet and Marnie attended to Harry's funeral.

When Juliet starts hanging out with Sid Sumner (Billy Price), the son of the Far-Right Group leader, Stuart Sumner (Chris Simmons), Romeo tells him to stay away. At Christmas Romeo and Peri set their friends Yasmine Maalik (Haiesha Mistry) and Tom Cunningham (Ellis Hollins) on a date and they both went to a Christmas party together. In 2020, Romeo meets Cher Winters (Bethannie Hare) and instantly became smitten with her. But he is shock when he learn that she's Sylver McQueen's (David Tag) long-lost daughter. He asked Cher out on a date, but she reject him, in front of Tom and Yazz. Romeo continues to pursue Cher and tries to impress her, much dismay to Sylver. Romeo gives Cher his number, but she gives it back to him, rejecting him once again.

Romeo tells Cher that he needs another job, so Cher's stepmother Mercedes McQueen (Jennifer Metcalfe) offers him a trial for a part-time job. However, Cher's aunt Goldie McQueen (Chelsee Healey) is suspicious of him and decides to challenge Romeo. Romeo takes on Goldie's challenge and completes it in the nick of time and gets offered a part-time job at The Dog. Later, Goldie sees that Romeo and Cher really like each other and recruits her fiancé Joel Dexter (Rory Douglas-Speed) to help her play matchmaker. Cher and Romeo later realise that Joel and Goldie have tried to set them up and Cher insists that her and Romeo are just friends. Upon hearing this, Goldie vows to get Romeo and Cher together. The next day, Romeo invites Cher to Imran Maalik's (Ijaz Rana) party with him. Romeo is delighted when Cher shows up and the two of them grow closer.

Warner announced his departure as Romeo in January 2024 with his final scenes airing in upcoming episodes.

== Phoenix Hathaway ==
Phoenix Hathaway (formerly Brooke Hathaway), played by Tylan Grant, first appeared on 10 July 2018. The character and Grant's casting details were announced on 23 April 2018. Brooke is an autistic teenager who is fostered by the Osborne family and is the first fictional autistic character to be a regular character in a soap opera; Grant is also the first BAME actor to portray an autistic character in a television series. Grant told the Loose Women panel that they are different from Brooke in real life, as they have different forms of autism. They added how "exciting" it was to represent autism. Kirkwood stated that Brooke would be introduced with a secret, and it was later revealed that Brooke is the child of Fran, who murdered Becca Dean (Ali Bastian) in 2007. In July 2021, scenes of Brooke realising they are non-binary aired; actor Grant said that the storyline meant a lot to them due to being non-binary in real life. Grant also stated that they hope Brooke can act as representation for an underrepresented group of people.

For their portrayal, Grant was nominated for Best Soap Newcomer at the 2018 Digital Spy Reader Awards; they came in eighth place with 3.9% of the total votes. In 2019, they received a nomination for Best Newcomer at the British Soap Awards, as well as a nomination for Best Young Actor at the Inside Soap Awards.

== Asha Kaur ==
Asha Kaur
- Hollyoaks character
- Portrayed by: Rukku Nahar
- First appearance: 30 July 2018
- Last appearance: 3 October 2018
- Introduced by: Bryan Kirkwood
In-universe information
- Sisters: Neeta Kaur

Asha Kaur, played by Rukku Nahar, made her first on screen appearance on 30 July 2018. The character and Nahar's casting details were announced on 17 July 2018 in the show's annual Summer trailer. Asha is the sister of the deceased Neeta Kaur (Amrit Maghera) who arrives to visit Neeta's partner, Hunter McQueen (Theo Graham). Nahar explained that Asha is emotionally to her sister. She explained that Asha is "slightly more naive when it comes to love, and is very impulsive and spontaneous." Sophie Dainty (Digital Spy) predicted that Asha's introduction would have "a huge impact on Hunter".

Further details about Asha's introduction were released on 27 July 2018. It was revealed that Asha would first appear when Hunter visits Neeta's murderer, Mac Nightingale (David Easter), in his care home. When Hunter sees Asha, he is shocked and believes that it is Neeta, leaving a note for her to contact him. However, when he returns home, he finds Asha and realises that it was her at the care home. Nahar explained that Asha would help Hunter through his battle with anxiety and that they would be support each other with their grief for Neeta. She added that they would "make life a lot more exciting for one another."

Asha was created following Graham's decision to quit the soap. Nahar was contracted for two months. Graham was surprised to be told that Asha would become Hunter's love interest and aid his departure. He was pleased that the characters could leave together happily. Graham expected that Asha and Hunter's relationship would work as they had good chemistry. He believed that Hunter's relationship with Asha is better for him than his relationship with Neeta. The actor commented, "I feel like he's found a balance and they could make a good go of it." The characters depart in the episode broadcast on 3 October 2018 after moving to Brighton, Asha's hometown.

== Martine Deveraux ==
Martine Deveraux
- Hollyoaks character
- Portrayed by: Kéllé Bryan
- Duration: 2018–2022
- First appearance: 8 October 2018
- Last appearance: 6 June 2022
- Introduced by: Bryan Kirkwood
- Spin-off appearances: Hollyoaks Later (2020)
In-universe information
- Other names: Martine Loveday; Martine Westwood
- Occupation: Air hostess
- Father: Walter Deveraux
- Mother: Gloria Deveraux
- Sisters: Simone Loveday; Melanie Deveraux
- Husband: Louis Loveday (2018–2019); Felix Westwood (2021–2022)
- Sons: Mitchell Deveraux; Toby Faroe
- Daughters: Celeste Faroe
- Stepsons: DeMarcus Westwood
- Uncles: Wilfred Deveraux
- Nephews: Zack Loveday
- Nieces: Lisa Loveday

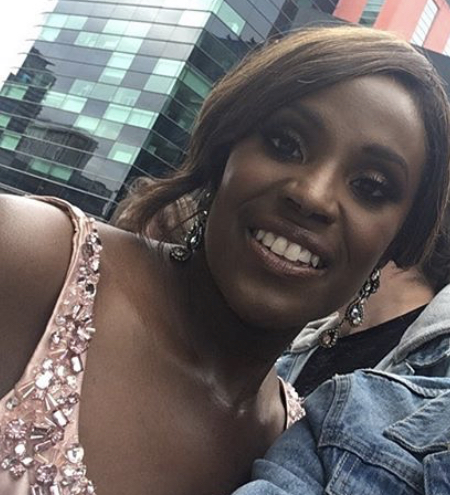
Kéllé Bryan portrays the role of Martine.

Martine Westwood (also Loveday and Deveraux), played by Kéllé Bryan, made her first on screen appearance on 8 October 2018 and her last appearance on 3 June 2022. The character and Bryan's casting details were announced on 20 September 2018. Martine is introduced as the sister of established character Simone Loveday (Jacqueline Boatswain). Executive producer Bryan Kirkwood said that there is "bristling, joyful tension" between the sisters, which he found a joy to watch. Bryan stated that Martine "says and does all of the things I would never dare to do".

Martine arrives following the return of Simone's former husband, Louis Loveday (Karl Collins), and shares a "whopping secret" with him and his partner, Leela Lomax (Kirsty-Leigh Porter). Daniel Kilkelly of Digital Spy reported that this would be "the beginning of the drama to come". Kirkwood confirmed that the secret would have a big effect on Simone and Louis. On Bryan's casting, Kirkwood commented, "She is a massive injection of energy into the cast and into the Loveday family." Bryan looked forward to joining the Hollyoaks cast and found playing Martine enjoyable. She added that she had been handed "diverse and thought-provoking" stories, which she likes and looks forward to filming.

In April 2021, Martine was the star of an episode that focused on the unconscious biases that she faces as a Black woman in the United Kingdom. Speaking to the Daily Mirror, Bryan expressed her gratuity to Hollyoaks for dealing with the issue appropriately and accurately. Whilst reading the episode plans, Bryan said that she connected with the writing so much that it "ignited in [her] the pain and the hatred for biases". The feelings of frustration led to her going "off-piste" and contributing to the episode herself. Bryan, a regular panellist on the ITV talk show Loose Women, talked about the episode on the show. She was asked by panellist Jane Moore if the episode was difficult to film, which she responded by saying that it was. Bryan felt she had to "park every other area of [her] life" in order to focus on the episode. She explained that the episode does not focus on people either being racist or not being racist, but the unconscious biases that lie between those mindsets. She was asked about her involvement in the episode, where she explained that executive producer Bryan Kirkwood asked for advice for the episode. The pair agreed that they did not want the episode to be subtle, and wanted to "tell the story very categorically". They felt that if they were bold with the storytelling, it would lead viewers to question their own biases and potentially "initiate social change".

== Father Marcus ==
Father Marcus
- Hollyoaks character
- Portrayed by: Lee Lomas
- Duration: 2018–2019
- First appearance: 8 October 2018
- Last appearance: 17 January 2019
- Introduced by: Bryan Kirkwood
In-universe information
- Occupation: Priest

Father Marcus, played by Lee Lomas, was a priest and a friend of Joel Dexter (Rory Douglas-Speed). Joel calls Father Marcus for help towards his wedding to Cleo McQueen (Nadine Mulkerrin) and asks if he will marry them. Cleo's relatives, Goldie McQueen (Chelsee Healey) and Nana McQueen (Diane Langton), overhear Father Marcus and challenge him, so he reveals that Joel and Cleo are planning to wed in secret. The wedding is cancelled when Cleo suffers a heart attack and Father Marcus comforts Joel. He reveals that he accidentally told Pete Buchanan (Kai Owen), the man who abused Cleo, about their wedding, unaware of his identity.

After Joel and Cleo end their relationship, Father Marcus invites Joel to rejoin the priesthood. Father Marcus later helps out at a soup kitchen for the homeless with Joel. After hearing Myra McQueen (Nicole Barber-Lane) being uncertain about holding her wedding ceremony at The Dog in the Pond public house, he tells her that God will love her no matter where the ceremony is held.

== Laurie Shelby ==
Laurie Shelby
- Hollyoaks character
- Portrayed by: Kyle Pryor
- Duration: 2018–2019
- First appearance: 8 November 2018
- Last appearance: 8 August 2019
- Introduced by: Bryan Kirkwood
In-universe information
- Occupation: Deputy head teacher
- Wife: Sinead O'Connor (until 2019)
- Stepdaughters: Hannah Hay-O'Connor

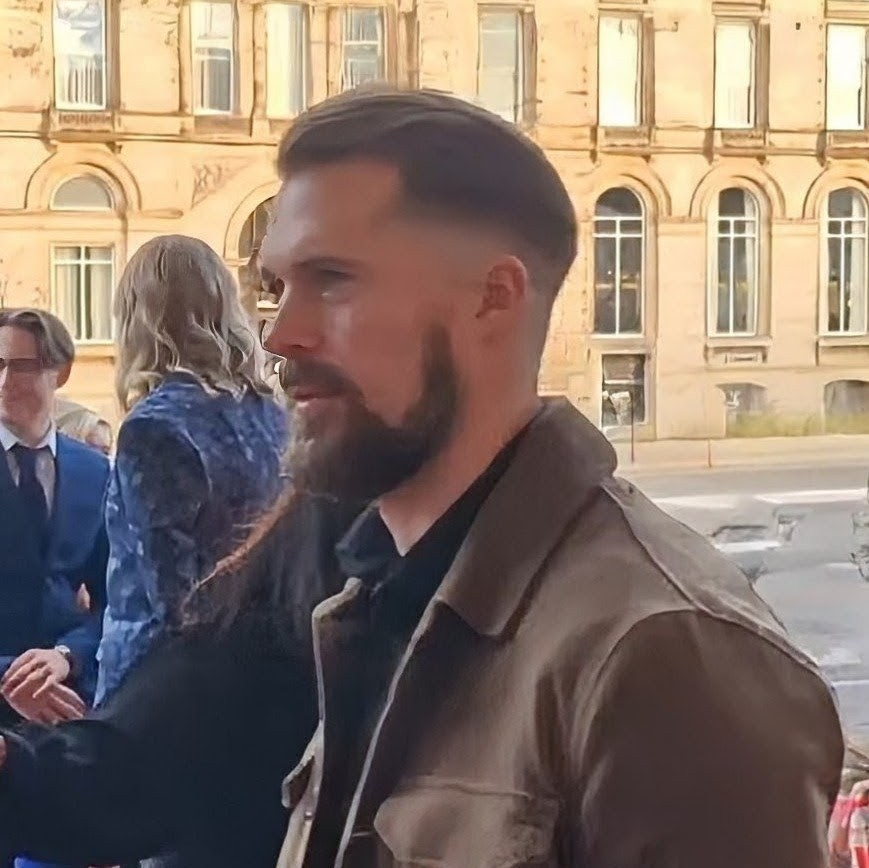
Kyle Pryor (pictured in 2025) played Laurie

Laurie Shelby, played by Kyle Pryor, made his first on screen appearance on 8 November 2018. Pryor's casting details were announced on 7 August 2018, when it was also revealed that his character would have a connection with returning character Sinead O'Connor (Stephanie Davis). The character and further details about the role were announced on 17 September 2018 in an interview with executive producer Bryan Kirkwood. Laurie is introduced as Sinead's husband and the new deputy head teacher of Hollyoaks High School. Pryor, a British-born New Zealand actor, looked forward to working in the United Kingdom and on the soap. Kirkwood praised Pryor's acting, describing it as "remarkable". Pryor confirmed that Laurie would be involved in an issue-based storyline, which would be one of two of the show's big storylines of 2019. He described it as "a really huge, real-life story". On 30 November 2018, it was announced that Laurie would feature in a sexual assault storyline exploring the MeToo movement. On-screen, the character meets with a woman who he sexually assaulted and has paid to sign a non-disclosure agreement, ensuring that the truth is not revealed. One month later, it was reported that Laurie's storyline would involve his colleague, Sienna Blake (Anna Passey), when he holds onto her waist for an uncomfortable amount of time. Sienna feels "unsettled" afterwards and confronts Laurie. Laurie was killed off after receiving a head injury from a police van crash. Laurie's final scenes aired on 8 August 2019.

== Juliet Nightingale ==
Juliet Nightingale (also Quinn), played by Niamh Blackshaw, made her first appearance on 21 November 2018. Juliet is the half-sister of Romeo (Owen Warner) and the daughter of Donna-Marie (Lucy-Jo Hudson), and was brought into the soap as part of the decision to expand the Quinn family. Juliet is initially portrayed as an aggressive, harsh character, but throughout her tenure, her vulnerable and emotional personality has been explored.

Juliet's storylines in the programme have included bullying Brooke Hathaway (Tylan Grant), her relationship with Sid Sumner (Billy Price) which led to the realisation that she is a lesbian, being groomed into selling drugs and having an attraction to friend Peri Lomax (Ruby O'Donnell). For her portrayal of Juliet, Blackshaw was nominated for Best Newcomer at the 2019 Inside Soap Awards.

== Jonny Baxter ==
Jonny Baxter
- Hollyoaks character
- Portrayed by: Ray Quinn
- Duration: 2018–2019
- First appearance: 26 November 2018
- Last appearance: 19 November 2019
- Introduced by: Bryan Kirkwood
In-universe information
- Other names: Gavin Jackson
- Occupation: Regional coffee shop manager

Jonny Baxter, portrayed by Ray Quinn, made his first appearance on 26 November 2018. The character and Quinn's casting details were announced on 19 November 2018. Jonny is introduced as a "mysterious stranger" who befriends established character Ste Hay (Kieron Richardson) following the death of his sister. He is the new owner of local coffee shop, Esther's Magic Bean, who hires Ste to work at the shop. Quinn described Jonny as a "complex character" who is involved in "challenging" plots. The actor expressed his delight at joining the soap and working with Richardson. His final scenes aired on 19 November 2019.

It was confirmed, days later, that Jonny and Ste would be the focus on a radicalisation and far-right extremism storyline. The story sees Jonny target and groom Ste after discovering his hatred for the Maalik family, who are Muslim. Quinn explained that Jonny is sent by the radicalisation group to recruit people. He added that Ste is an ideal person to recruit since he is "very vulnerable and low on his self-esteem". Jonny then cares for Ste "emotionally and financially", growing his self-confidence with an underlying reason. Executive producer Bryan Kirkwood explained that he decided to tackle the issue after discovering how radicalisation groups work. He added that the story is "a modern story about protecting young people online". Richardson was pleased to be undertaking the storyline alongside Quinn. Quinn, Richardson and Hollyoaks storyliners and researchers worked alongside advisors and charities when creating and developing the storyline. One advisor, Jamie Bartlett, believed that it was important that extremism was explored so that the public knew how extremists operate. The charity EXIT UK agreed that it was good to highlight the taboo topic and offered support and guidance to the cast and crew.

== DS Yates ==
DS Yates
- Hollyoaks character
- Portrayed by: Dean Smith
- Duration: 2018–2019
- First appearance: 21 December 2018
- Last appearance: 29 May 2019
- Introduced by: Bryan Kirkwood
In-universe information
- Occupation: Detective Sergeant

DS Yates, played by Dean Smith, was a detective sergeant who arrests Goldie McQueen (Chelsee Healey) when she violates her bail conditions by getting into a fight with her cousin, Mercedes McQueen (Jennifer Metcalfe). After receiving a note that confesses to other murders, Yates releases Goldie and holds a press conference; during the press conference, he claims to be close to catching the killer, but later confides in former police officer, Jack Osborne (Jimmy McKenna), that he is struggling. Yates later questions Breda McQueen (Moya Brady) after Louis Loveday (Karl Collins) goes missing. After Maxine Minniver (Nikki Sanderson) collapses due to drinking vodka laced with chemicals, Yates interviews multiple people in connection with the case; he discovers that Liam Donovan (Jude Monk McGowan) is responsible, but accepts a bribe from him. Lisa Loveday (Rachel Adedeji) reports Mercedes to Yates for drug possession; he lets her off with a caution after seeing Liam and receiving another bribe. He later brings Ste Hay (Kieron Richardson) in for questioning after Terry Hay (Stuart Wolfenden) reports him for assaulting him. He issues a caution to Imran Maalik (Ijaz Rana) after Ste reports him for assault.

After Cindy Cunningham (Stephanie Waring) is framed for breaking into Mac Nightingale's (David Easter) house, he arrests her for burglary. He arrests Breda after she is reported for stealing from Price Slice. Yates questions Jonny Baxter (Ray Quinn) and Stuart Sumner (Chris Simmons) after Shahid Shirani (Alex Williams) is assaulted. However Ste backs up their version of events. Yates informs Cindy, Marnie Nightingale (Lysette Anthony) and Juliet Quinn (Niamh Blackshaw) that Mac had been murdered. He later interview Romeo Quinn (Owen Warner) in connection with the murder, but lets him go when the CPS decide there is not enough evidence. After doing a search on Romeo, he finds a vial of poison that Breda accidentally planted on him. After gathering enough evidence, he charges Romeo with Mac's murder. After Grace Black (Tamara Wall) is run over, Yates arrives to question Harry Thompson (Parry Glasspool), as his car was used; the next day he arrests and questions Harry over the crime. After Farrah Maalik (Krupa Pattani) reports Liam for knowing something about the crash, Yates brings him in. He agrees to get rid of the evidence surrounding Farrah's call if Liam pays him £30,000. After Yates hears Romeo telling James Nightingale (Gregory Finnegan) that he wasn't with Harry on the night of the crash, he brings Harry in for further questioning.

== Walter Deveraux ==
Walter Deveraux
- Hollyoaks character
- Portrayed by: Trevor A. Toussaint
- Duration: 2018–2022
- First appearance: 31 December 2018
- Last appearance: 23 November 2022
- Introduced by: Bryan Kirkwood
- Spin-off appearances: Hollyoaks Later (2020)
In-universe information
- Occupation: Priest
- Brothers: Wilfred Deveraux
- Wife: Gloria Deveraux (backstory)
- Daughters: Simone Loveday; Martine Deveraux; Melanie Deveraux
- Grandsons: Zack Loveday; Mitchell Deveraux; Toby Faroe
- Granddaughters: Lisa Loveday; Celeste Faroe

Walter Deveraux, portrayed by Trevor A. Toussaint, made his first appearance on 31 December 2018. The character and Toussaint's casting details were announced on 16 December 2018. Walter is introduced as the father of established characters Simone Loveday (Jacqueline Boatswain) and Martine Deveraux (Kéllé Bryan). He is billed as "stern and deeply religious". Toussaint described Walter as self-righteous, explaining that he thinks that he is "the man who does no wrong". Martine is not pleased with Walter's arrival, which creates tension in the family immediately. On his casting, Toussaint commented, "Since joining Hollyoaks, it's been a whirlwind. My feet have hardly touched the ground".

When he finds a picture of his grandson, Mitchell (Imran Adams) and Scott Drinkwell (Ross Adams), Mitchell comes out as gay, he reveals his brother, Wilfred, was gay and that killed him and expresses he cannot allow Mitchell to be gay despite Martine and Mitchell trying to reason with him. He berates Martine when she tries to stop Walter taking Mitchell to church to repent which sparks Mitchell to accept his sexuality and give his grandfather the harsh truth that he wants everyone to be like him and if not they have to go. He then kicks Mitchell out, telling him he is no longer welcome in the family home. In November 2022, in previously unannounced scenes, Toussaint made his final appearance as Walter. Of his time on the soap, Hollyoaks said: "Thank you for bringing us Walter! So many fantastic moments, we really are going to miss you!"

== Other characters ==
Character	Episode(s)	Original broadcast date(s)	Actor	Details
Vince	4820	5 January	Joe Tucker	A prospective client of lawyers James Nightingale (Gregory Finnegan) and Sami Maalik (Rishi Nair). Vince favours James until Sami speaks with him, but after Sami is called away, Vince sees James' on-off lover, Harry Thompson (Parry Glasspool), reject James. Vince offers James his business if James can arrange for him to have sex with Harry; James agrees, but when Harry takes Vince to a private room, they are interrupted by Harry's father, Tony Hutchinson (Nick Pickard).
Liz	4827, 4983, 5042–5043	16 January−15 November (4 episodes)	Balvinder Sopal	Also credited as "Social Worker". A social worker who observes Courtney Campbell (Amy Conachan) looking after her daughter, Iona. Despite offering assurances that she is only there to help, when she leaves Courtney worries that she is planning to take Iona away from her. After Courtney is arrested for drug dealing, Liz removes Iona from Courtney's care and gives custody to Courtney's grandmother, Granny Campbell (Jenny Lee). Liz later meets with Courtney and Jesse Donovan (Luke Jerdy) after Courtney's drug charges are dropped, to discuss Iona's care; she is impressed by the couple and grants them custody of Iona.
Beryl	4828	17 January	Amy Drake	A woman who claims to know Luke Morgan's (Gary Lucy) wife, Scarlett Morgan (Susie Amy). Luke and Darren Osborne (Ashley Taylor Dawson), discover that she is lying to them in the hope of getting some money; when they expose her, Beryl leaves.
Doctor Kirby	4847	13 February	Rachael McGuinness	An oncologist who informs Sienna Blake (Anna Passey) and Joel Dexter (Rory Douglas-Speed) that Sienna is in remission after battling cervical cancer. Alfie Nightingale (Richard Linnell) later sees Doctor Kirby with another patient, whom he mistakes for his dead girlfriend, Jade Albright (Kassius Nelson).
Penny	4853–4854	20–21 February (2 episodes)	Natalie Grady	A woman who Adam Donovan (Jimmy Essex) sees getting into a car with his father, Glenn Donovan (Bob Cryer). Adam confronts Glenn about this, but he claims that Penny is a contractor. It emerges that Penny is the judge at Glenn's son, Jesse Donovan's (Luke Jerdy), trial; Penny throws the case out of court and Adam confronts her about her about her connection to Glenn. Penny admits that Glenn threatened to kill her husband if Jesse was not found innocent.
Crystal	4861	5 March	Frog Stone	An education officer who informs Maxine Minniver (Nikki Sanderson) about the education options for her daughter, Minnie Minniver (Eva Lorente).
Vicar	4862	6 March	Stewart Marquis	A vicar who marries Prince McQueen (Malique Thompson-Dwyer) and Lily Drinkwell (Lauren McQueen).
Connor	4866, 4880–4881, 4915	12 March–21 May (4 episodes)	Eddy Massarella	A man who follows Sienna Blake (Anna Passey). Connor breaks into her flat, but flees when Sienna sees him; he drops his phone as he exits. Connor is later arrested, but released due to unsubstantial evidence. Joel Dexter (Rory Douglas-Speed) sees him leaving and confronts him; Connor refuses to speak until Joel pays him £1,000; when Joel meets up with Connor and punches him in frustration, Connor assaults him and takes the money. At Sienna's funeral, Connor appears, pretending to Sienna's dead daughter, Nico Blake (Persephone Swales-Dawson); he is apprehended by police and questioned, before being released.
Doctor	4867	13 March	Asha Kingsley	A doctor who treats Sienna Blake (Anna Passey) after she is hit by a car. She informs Sienna that she has two broken ribs and there is a shadow on her scan, so they need to perform a biopsy.
Lucca	4881	2 April	Misha Timmins	The leader of a baby group that Sienna Blake (Anna Passey) attends with her son, Sebastian Blake (Oakley and Ocean). Lucca asks Sienna about her twins, unaware that Sebastian's sister, Sophie Blake (Lottie and Laylie), has been kidnapped, leading to Sienna to storm out the session.
Male Voice	4884–4931, 4948–4962, 4985–5001	5 April−18 September (33 episodes)	Harvey Robinson	A disembodied voice that Alfie Nightingale (Richard Linnell) begins hearing after developing schizoaffective disorder. The voice isolates Alfie from his friends and family, changes his behaviour and regularly berates him. It convinces him that a meteor will hit the village and that he can revive his dead girlfriend, Jade Albright (Kassius Nelson), through an alternative dimension. When this fails, but Alfie sees Sienna Blake (Anna Passey), who was thought to be dead, the voice convinces him that he is able to bring people back from the dead. The voice later convinces Alfie that he has a new theory of gravity and warns Alfie that his family are at risk, so he locks them in the house. To prove his theory, Alfie tries to jump off a high archway in the village, but is admitted to a hospital. The voice makes Alfie untrusting of his doctor and family, but Alfie stops hearing it after he starts taking medication for the schizoaffective disorder. When Alfie stops taking his medication, the voice returns and tells Alfie to report his sister, Ellie Nightingale (Sophie Porley), for an assault on their father, Mac Nightingale (David Easter). The voice then tells Alfie to move in with his mother, Cindy Savage (Stephanie Waring), before Alfie recommences taking his medication.
Amelia Gething	4885	9 April	Herself	A YouTuber and food vlogger who visits The Hutch restaurant to review the establishment. Amelia annoys Diane Hutchinson (Alex Fletcher) for asking for food that is not on the menu. She later sees Diane shouting at her daughter, Dee Dee Hutchinson (Lacey Findlow).
Ms Lewis	4888–4918, 4957–4958, 5001–5024	12 April–19 October (9 episodes)	Charlotte Gascoyne	A neurological specialist who treats Dee Dee Hutchinson (Lacey Findlow) for autoimmune encephalitis. She informs Dee Dee's parents, Diane Hutchinson (Alex Fletcher), Tony Hutchinson (Nick Pickard) and Tegan Lomax (Jessica Ellis), that Dee Dee's treatment has not worked. When Dee Dee's second round of medication fails, Ms Lewis advises Diane and Tegan that Dee Dee should undergo chemotherapy. Dee Dee is placed in a medical coma and as Ms Lewis prepares to wake her up, she informs Tony and Diane that due to her weakened immune system, Dee Dee has an infection. However, the following day, Ms Lewis tells Dee Dee's family that her antibiotics have worked and that she will make a full recovery.
Dean	4893	19 April	Alfie Kingsnorth	A homeless teenager who befriends Peri Lomax (Ruby O'Donnell) when she is begging. He introduces Peri to his friend, Harley Frater (Mollie Lambert), and they help her. When they discover why Peri is homeless, they disown her, but later, they reunite with Peri. Dean has a cough and one morning, Peri discovers that Dean is dead.
Receptionist	4893	19 April	Jess Schofield	A receptionist at a bed and breakfast that Peri Lomax (Ruby O'Donnell) stays at after being thrown out of her home by her mother, Leela Lomax (Kirsty-Leigh Porter). When she finds out that Peri no longer has the money to pay for the room, she throws her out onto the streets.
Janet	4893	19 April	Jodie Barchha Lang	A worker at a hostel where Peri Lomax (Ruby O'Donnell) stays for a night. Much to Peri's surprise, Janet tells her that she won't be able to have her own room, and must instead share with other homeless people staying there for the night.
Businessman	4893	19 April	Simeon Truby	A businessman who offers to help Peri Lomax (Ruby O'Donnell) when she is living on the streets. He offers to take Peri to his car, but is stopped by Dean (Alfie Kingsnorth) who believes that the businessman is planning to take advantage of Peri.
Homeless Woman	4893	19 April	Tara Daniels	A homeless woman who shouts at Peri Lomax (Ruby O'Donnell) for sleeping in her friend's bed in the hostel. When it becomes clear to her that Peri is not moving, she threatens Peri to stay quiet for the night.
Homeless Man	4893	19 April	Michael Ledwich	A homeless man who steals the tent that homeless Peri Lomax (Ruby O'Donnell), Harley Frater (Mollie Lambert) and Dean (Alfie Kingsnorth) are sleeping in. When Dean tries getting the tent back, the homeless man punches him, causing the trio to leave.
D.S. Stanton	4894	20 April	Marc Ralph	A detective sergeant who talks to Peri Lomax (Ruby O'Donnell) and Harley Frater (Mollie Lambert) following the death of their homeless friend, Dean (Alfie Kingsnorth). D.S. Stanton later returns a credit card belonging to Peri's mother, Leela Lomax (Kirsty-Leigh Porter), after finding it on Dean's body. While at the house, he sees a picture of Peri and tells Leela and her partner, Louis Loveday (Karl Collins), that he saw Peri; he escorts the couple to a place where homeless people gather, but they fail to see Peri.
Janine Harrington	4902–4914	2–18 May (3 episodes)	Rebecca Eastham	A woman who meets Alfie Nightingale (Richard Linnell), who is suffering from undiagnosed schizoaffective disorder, in a club while he is on a date with Yasmine Maalik (Haiesha Mistry). After Yasmin abruptly leaves due to Alfie's behaviour, he takes Janine outside the club and has sex with her. Alfie later sees Janine again and spontaneously proposes to her, but she rejects him.
Education Welfare Officer	4906	8 May	Shari Fox	An education welfare officer who visits Misbah Maalik (Harvey Virdi) after Imran Maalik (Ijaz Rana) plays truant from school for several weeks. As a result of Imran playing truant and Misbah not responding to their correspondence, the education welfare officer fines her.
Alan Carr	4908	10 May	Himself	Carr makes a cameo appearance when he's walking his dogs, and observes Yasmine Maalik (Haiesha Mistry) having an argument with Tony (Nick Pickard) and Diane Hutchinson (Alex Fletcher).
Doctor	4912	16 May	Johanne Murdock	A doctor who treats Sienna Blake (Anna Passey) after she is stabbed by her daughter, Nico Blake (Persephone Swales-Dawson). She later informs Sienna's friends and family that she has died, although this is later revealed to be untrue.
P.C. Fields	4915	21 May	Joe Warner	A police constable who supervises Sally St. Claire (Annie Wallace) and Sebastian Blake (Oakley and Ocean) during the funeral of Sebastian's mother, Sienna Blake (Anna Passey). When she realises that Sebastian is unwell, Sally tries taking him to hospital, but P.C. Fields stops them until he is told that Sienna's daughter and murderer, Nico Blake (Persephone Swales-Dawson), has been apprehended at the funeral.
Jane Fisher	4924–4925	1–4 June (2 episodes)	Emma Rydal	A social worker who Sally St. Claire (Annie Wallace) arranges a meeting with after she suspects that Misbah Maalik (Harvey Virdi) is abusing Imran Maalik (Ijaz Rana). Jane visits the Maaliks the following day, where Misbah admits that she had hit Imran. After Imran's testimony, Jane allows him to stay in the custody of Misbah.
Doctor Tate	4927	6 June	Daniel Hawksford	A doctor who treats Hunter McQueen (Theo Graham) following a collapse after he drinks too much alcohol and combines laughing gas with his anxiety medication.
Doctor Foggarty	4928–4948	7 June−5 July (4 episodes)	Lu Corfield	A doctor who treats Alfie Nightingale (Richard Linnell) for schizoaffective disorder after he attempts to jump off of an archway. Due to his schizoaffective disorder, Doctor Foggarty recommends that Alfie stay in the hospital. She later transfers Alfie to a psychiatric ward for further treatment.
Kelvin	4929	8 June	Paul Longley	A former boyfriend of Liberty Savage (Jessamy Stoddart) who bundles her into a car and demands that she return his hard drives to him, but Liberty denies knowledge of them. Milo Entwistle (Nathan Morris) reports Kelvin to the police, so Kelvin informs them about the stolen hard drives. Kelvin later spots Milo with the hard drives and questions him, while Liberty's father, Dirk Savage (David Kennedy), removes the tyres from Kelvin's car, in retaliation for his treatment of Liberty.
Sergeant Mike Fletcher	4934, 4976	15 June−24 August (2 episodes)	Simon Naylor	A desk sergeant who handles Maxine Minniver (Nikki Sanderson) when she comes in to complain about D.S. Roxy Cassidy (Lizzie Stavrou). When Maxine is later arrested after destroying the wake at Adam Donovan's (Jimmy Essex) funeral, he joins D.S. Cassidy in interviewing Maxine. Sergeant Fletcher later confronts Romeo Quinn (Owen Warner) about an illegal rave he has thrown. Despite Romeo using his own knowledge of the law to argue with him, the rave is shut down.
Sean McCardle	4935	18 June	Scott Anson	A football scouting agent who observes Oliver Morgan (Aedan Duckworth) and tells him that he shall check on his progress.
Sonographer	4937	20 June	Kate Victors	A sonographer who performs an ultrasound on Nico Blake (Persephone Swales-Dawson).
Mrs Hartley	4942	27 June	Vanessa Hehir	The former French teacher of Damon Kinsella (Jacob Roberts) and Brody Hudson (Adam Woodward) who arrives after being contacted by Milo Entwistle (Nathan Morris), who was posing as Damon. She scolds Damon for the messages he sent her and tells his girlfriend, Holly Cunningham (Amanda Clapham), about them. When she sees Brody, she tries to kiss him, but he turns her down because he has a long-standing promise with Damon.
Bryce	4945	2 July	Adam Jackson Smith	A client of James Nightingale (Gregory Finnegan) who appears in a flashback to James' early career. Bryce is embezzling funds from a company he works for and James promises to get him found innocent on the condition that Bryce teaches him how to successfully embezzle funds.
Danny	4945	2 July	Frankie Roome	A classmate of James Nightingale (David Perkins) who appears in a flashback to James' childhood when James tries to kiss Danny. When James' father, Mac Nightingale (David Easter), threatens to report Danny to the headmistress for spreading rumours about James' sexuality, Danny confirms that James tried kissing him.
Doctor Bolton	4947	4 July	Christopher Jordan	A doctor who informs Ellie Nightingale (Sophie Porley) that she is pregnant. He later advises Glenn Donovan (Bob Cryer) to tell his partner, Grace Black (Tamara Wall), about his condition.
Nurse	4948	5 July	Kate Hampson	A nurse who performs an ultrasound on Ellie Nightingale (Sophie Porley) and informs her about the possibility of an abortion.
Doctor Spellman	4949–4950	6–9 July (2 episodes)	Sarah Groarke	A doctor who Marnie Nightingale (Lysette Anthony) consults for a second opinion after her son, Alfie Nightingale (Richard Linnell), is diagnosed with schizoaffective disorder. Marnie is annoyed when Doctor Spellman agrees with Doctor Foggarty's (Lu Corfield) diagnosis.
Edna	4954	13 July	Barbara Drennan	A food reviewer for the Cheshire Foodie who visits The Hutch restaurant on the request of Mandy Richardson (Sarah Jayne Dunn). However, Mandy struggles to impress Edna, but she is won around after Luke Morgan (Gary Lucy) manages to make her laugh. After sampling some of The Hutch's new menu, Edna agrees to feature the restaurant in the magazine.
Gillian	4956, 5005	17 July−24 September (2 episodes)	Gemma Harvey	A social worker who is assigned to Brooke Hathaway's (Tylan Grant) care plan. She assess whether Nancy Osborne (Jessica Fox) and Darren Osborne (Ashley Taylor Dawson) are suitable foster carers for Brooke. Due to Nancy's multiple sclerosis, she initially rules that Nancy would be unsuitable, but after an impassioned speech by Darren, she agrees to interview them to see whether they are suitable candidates. When Gillian conducts the interview, she is impressed by the couple and agrees to let them care for Brooke.
Phoenix	4959	20 July	Shireen Ashton	A stripper at the stag party of Damon Kinsella (Jacob Roberts). After she sees that Damon's friend, Brody Hudson (Adam Woodward), is upset, she comforts him and they have sex.
Christopher	4961, 4983	24 July−23 August (2 episodes)	Jonathan Milshaw	A married man who has occasional sex with prostitute Harry Thompson (Parry Glasspool). Christopher notices Harry in the village and despite Harry trying to get him to stay away from him, they eventually have sex. Christopher books Harry for more sex, but after Christopher comments on his attitude, Harry leaves without having sex with him.
Security Guard	4971	7 August	Kel Lupton	A prison security guard who hands Harry Thompson (Parry Glasspool) a note from James Nightingale (Gregory Finnegan).
Ronaldio	4975	13 August	Linal Haft	A man who Nana McQueen (Diane Langton) meets while on holiday in Magaluf. Nana arranges to meet him after talking on a dating app, but she rejects him when they meet due to his age and not looking like his profile picture. However, she later warms to him, and leaves with him.
DJ James Hype	4985	27 August	Himself	A DJ at a rave arranged by Prince McQueen (Malique Thompson-Dwyer) and Romeo Quinn (Owen Warner).
Officer Alison Heath	4991–4993	4–6 September (2 episodes)	Laurietta Essien	A police officer who interviews Oliver Morgan (Aedan Duckworth) about his sexual abuse report. Oliver tells her that Scott Drinkwell (Ross Adams) is his absuer, so she interviews Scott; Oliver later admits that Buster Smith (Nathan Sussex) is his abuser. Alison interviews Buster and arrests him after discovering evidence relating to the charges.
Pharmacist	5000	17 September	Stephen Marzella	A pharmacist who Yasmine Maalik (Haiesha Mistry) goes to see to redeem Misbah Maalik's (Harvey Virdi) anxiety medication prescription. As the pharmacist knows Misbah, he calls her instead of redeeming the prescription.
Doctor Cadman	5018–5019	11–12 October (2 episodes)	Sally Walsh	A doctor who treats Cleo McQueen (Nadine Mulkerrin) after being admitted for bulimia nervosa following a heart attack. She informs her family about her condition and tells Cleo's aunt, Myra McQueen (Nicole Barber-Lane), that Cleo's liver was punctured during CPR, meaning she needs surgery.
D.S. Callard	5023, 5036–5046	18 October−20 November (4 episodes)	Neil Grainger	A police officer who questions Kim Butterfield (Daisy Wood-Davis) after she is reported for the murder of Glenn Donovan (Bob Cryer) by his son, Liam Donovan (Jude Monk McGowan). After having the vial of poison reanalysed, D.S. Callard informs Liam that Kiam is not connected to the death. He later questions Mercedes McQueen (Jennifer Metcalfe) about the murder of her fiancé, Russ Owen (Stuart Manning), but releases her after Breda McQueen (Moya Brady) gives Mercedes a false alibi. D.S. Callard brings evidence from the crime scene to Mercedes and she claims that it belongs to Goldie McQueen (Chelsee Healey).
Rick Astley	5023	18 October	Himself	Astley is at a bus stop that Kim Butterfield (Daisy Wood-Davis) arrives at after confessing to the murder of Glenn Donovan (Bob Cryer). Astley's appearance was nominated for "Most Bizarre Soap Storyline" at the 2018 Digital Spy Reader Awards.
Susanna Reid	5025–5029	22–26 October (3 episodes)	Herself	Reid, Morgan, Bruce and Kirkwood all report on Storm Belinda, a storm which impacts the village. Reid and Morgan also report on the cleanup operation and the death of Tegan Lomax (Jessica Ellis), while Kirkwood displays images of the storm's wreckage in her report. Bruce does not appear and makes a voiceover appearance.
Piers Morgan	5025–5029	22–26 October (3 episodes)	Himself	Reid, Morgan, Bruce and Kirkwood all report on Storm Belinda, a storm which impacts the village. Reid and Morgan also report on the cleanup operation and the death of Tegan Lomax (Jessica Ellis), while Kirkwood displays images of the storm's wreckage in her report. Bruce does not appear and makes a voiceover appearance.
Ken Bruce	5025–5029	22–26 October (3 episodes)	Himself	Reid, Morgan, Bruce and Kirkwood all report on Storm Belinda, a storm which impacts the village. Reid and Morgan also report on the cleanup operation and the death of Tegan Lomax (Jessica Ellis), while Kirkwood displays images of the storm's wreckage in her report. Bruce does not appear and makes a voiceover appearance.
Carol Kirkwood	5026–5028	23–25 October (2 episodes)	Herself	Reid, Morgan, Bruce and Kirkwood all report on Storm Belinda, a storm which impacts the village. Reid and Morgan also report on the cleanup operation and the death of Tegan Lomax (Jessica Ellis), while Kirkwood displays images of the storm's wreckage in her report. Bruce does not appear and makes a voiceover appearance.
Doctor Slavin	5028–5029, 5047–5062	25 October−12 December (5 episodes)	Rebecca Bainbridge	A doctor and colleague of Misbah Maalik (Harvey Virdi) who treats Tegan Lomax (Jessica Ellis) after she is crushed by a tree. Doctor Slavin has to stop Misbah from continuing to treat Tegan as she is suspended. The doctor tries to save Tegan's life, but she dies; she later tells Tegan's family that the procedure that Misbah performed on Tegan caused her death. Doctor Slavin later consults Prince McQueen (Malique Thompson-Dwyer) when he undergoes testing for testicular cancer; Prince struggles with the testing and leaves. She later confirms to Prince that it is likely that he has cancer and that he will need a testicle removed.
Arlo Watson	5032, 5075–5079	31 October 2018– 10 January 2019 (5 episodes)	Maxim De Villiers	A professional footballer, trained by Buster Smith (Nathan Sussex), who supports him after he is accused of child sexual abuse. Before Buster's trial, Arlo approaches Buster's victim, Oliver Morgan (Aedan Duckworth), and attempts to convince him not to testify. Oliver initially takes up his offer, but is disappointed when Arlo explains that he wants Buster to be found not guilty. During the trial, Arlo approaches Buster's son, Damon Kinsella (Jacob Roberts), and hands him a note from Buster.
Clerk	5032	31 October	Moshana Khan	The clerk and judge at Buster Smith's (Nathan Sussex) plea hearing.
Judge	5032	31 October	Giles Ford	The clerk and judge at Buster Smith's (Nathan Sussex) plea hearing.
Doctor Rainford	5050–5051	26–27 November (2 episodes)	Mary Ryder	A doctor who conducts Misbah Maalik's (Harvey Virdi) misconduct hearing following the death of Tegan Lomax (Jessica Ellis); she asks Misbah about her previous conflicts with Tegan, but ultimately rules that there was no misconduct. After Sinead Shelby (Stephanie Davis) confronts Misbah during a job interview, Doctor Rainford places Misbah on official leave, due to the poor publicity that the hospital is receiving.
Officer Garston	5054	30 November	Chris Jack	A police officer who questions Imran Maalik (Ijaz Rana) after he confesses to assaulting Misbah Maalik (Harvey Virdi), Yasmine Maalik (Haiesha Mistry) and Ste Hay (Kieron Richardson). After taking Imran's statement and talking to the CPS, Officer Garston informs the Maalik family that Imran will be sent to a rehabilitation centre.
Georgia	5054–5055, 5195	30 November−3 December 21 June (3 episodes)	Devora Wilde	A former co-worker of Laurie Shelby (Kyle Pryor) who accuses him of sexually assaulting her. Laurie initially meets her again to get her to sign a non-disclosure agreement, but he doesn't have the money to pay her. After getting her the money, they meet again and she signs the agreement. However, before she leaves, she calls him a predator and dangerous. Later, Georgia is contacted by Sami Maalik (Rishi Nair) and Liberty Savage (Jessamy Stoddart), after Laurie rapes Sinead Shelby (Stephanie Davis). Georgia agrees to bring a sexual assault charge against Laurie, but he later sees her in the village and she is intimidated into leaving.
Keith	5056	4 December	Andrew Pollard	A family mediation officer for Nancy Osborne (Jessica Fox) and Darren Osborne (Ashley Taylor Dawson) who assesses who should gain full custody of their children. After hearing Darren, Nancy and Mandy Morgan (Sarah Jayne Dunn) arguing over their respective relationships, he decides that their case should be heard by a family court.
Jamie Johnson	5061–5063	11–13 December (3 episodes)	Laura Ainsworth	The sister of Jay Johnson (Michael Dixon) who contacts Liam Donovan (Jude Monk McGowan) after he tries to sell her some vodka. After agreeing a deal, they have sex, but when Jamie discovers that the vodka is dodgy, and Liam refuses to give her a refund, she kidnaps his brother, Jesse Donovan (Luke Jerdy). Liam's sister, Grace Black (Tamara Wall), and girlfriend, Lisa Loveday (Rachel Adedeji), find enough money to pay Jamie back, Liam gives her the money and she leaves.
Andrew	5064	14 December	Tom McGarva	An officer assigned to Brody Hudson (Adam Woodward) after he makes sexual abuse allegations against Buster Smith (Nathan Sussex).
Doctor Schneider	5065, 5067	17–19 December (2 episodes)	Anne Hornby	A Hollyoaks High School governor who meets with headteacher Sally St. Claire (Annie Wallace), deputy headteacher Laurie Shelby (Kyle Pryor) and his wife, Sinead Shelby (Stephanie Davis), to discuss the failings of the school's nativity performance. Sinead suggests that teachers get involved, which Doctor Schneider likes; she then casts Laurie and Sinead in the play.
Doctor Yang	5066, 5096, 5146–5147, 5149	18 December 2018– 4 February 2019 15-18 April 2019 (5 episodes)	Christina Tam	A doctor who confirms to Mandy Morgan (Sarah Jayne Dunn) and Darren Osborne (Ashley Taylor Dawson) that Mandy's unborn child has spina bifida. She later confirms to the pair that Mandy could have an operation to fix the condition. When Mandy goes into premature labour, Doctor Yang performs a cesarean section to deliver DJ.
Wes	5069	21 December	Scott Dyet	The father of Sylver McQueen (David Tag) who appears in a flashback to Sylver's childhood. He is murdered by Breda McQueen (Moya Brady) after she witnesses him being a poor father.
Deborah	5072	31 December	Gemma Paige North	A woman who Jonny Baxter (Ray Quinn) arranges to meet with Ste Hay (Kieron Richardson) to cater her wedding. Ste impresses her with the food, but due to miscalculations, he allows her to agree to a deal where he does not make a profit. Jonny later speaks to Deborah and arranges a better deal.
