= David Tag =

English actor

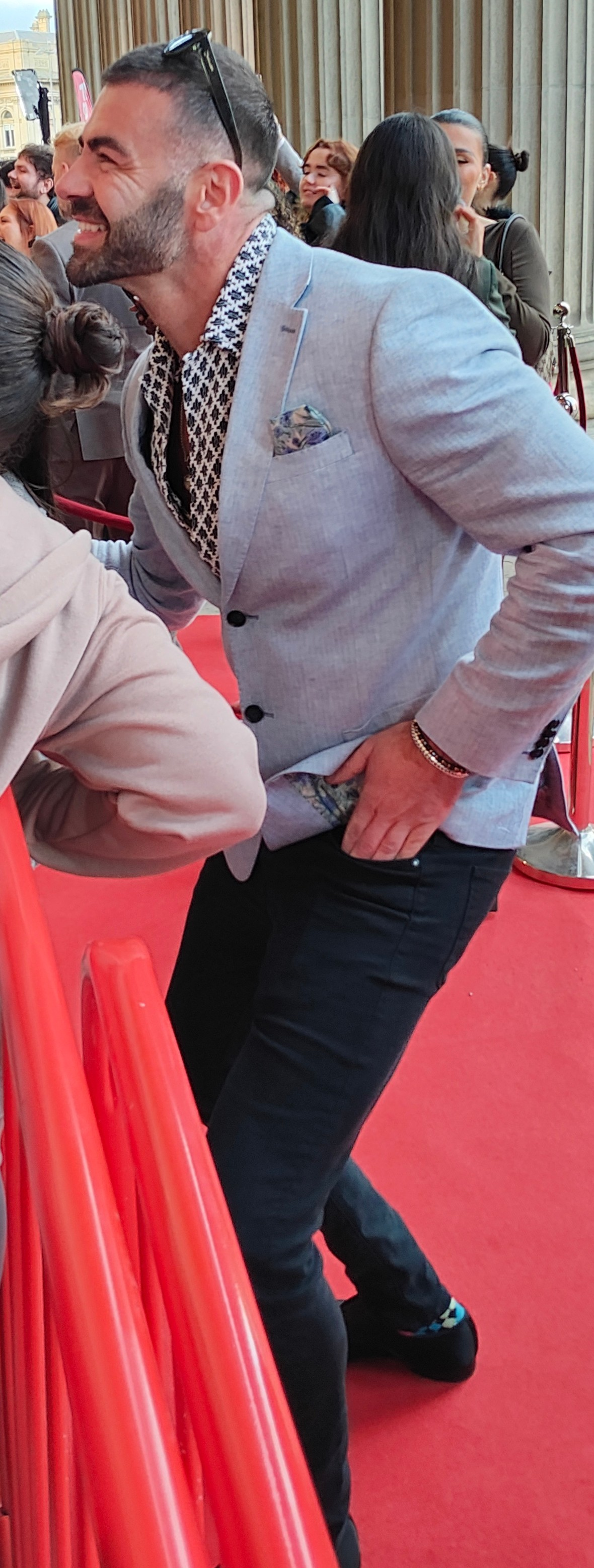
- Tag in 2025
- Born: David Mabibolla Taghinejad; Stockport, Greater Manchester, England
- Education: Manchester School of Acting University of Salford
- Occupation: Actor
- Years active: 2016–present
- Television: Hollyoaks
- Children: 2

David Mabibolla Taghinejad, known professionally as David Tag, is an English actor. He is known for portraying the role of Sylver McQueen in the Channel 4 soap opera Hollyoaks from June 2018 until January 2022 before then returning for three further episodes in 2026.

== Career ==
Tag studied at the Manchester School of Acting between 2012 and 2017, during which time he made his acting debut in an episode of the Channel 4 soap opera Hollyoaks as PSCO Rocco. After graduating in 2017, he appeared as Darryl in an episode of the ITV soap opera Emmerdale, a customer in the Woolpack.

In 2018, Tag returned to Hollyoaks and was cast in the regular role of Sylver McQueen. He was introduced as the brother of established character Goldie McQueen (Chelsee Healey) and the son of Breda McQueen (Moya Brady). The character's storylines in the soap included the discovery that he was adopted and that his adoptive mother Breda was a serial killer who had killed his biological father and his stepfather, which ultimately resulted in Sylver killing her in self defence, his marriage to Mercedes McQueen (Jennifer Metcalfe) and the revelation that he was the father of Cher Winters (Bethannie Hare). Tag left the soap in January 2022, and the character was killed off after being left to die by his stepson Bobby Costello (Jayden Fox).

In 2020, Tag portrayed Thomas in the LGBTQ+ themed short film S.A.M. alongside Sam Retford and George Webster. In 2021, he appeared alongside Retford again in the short film White Wedding in which he played the role of a vampire prince. From December 2021 to January 2022, he played the Ringleader in the pantomime Goldilocks and the Three Bears at St Helens Theatre Royal and is set to reprise the role at Epstein Theatre between December 2022 and January 2023. In 2022, he starred as Ted in the short film Hello, Death and as Mr J. in the documentary Dark Phones. He also appeared in an episode of Meet the Richardsons and was a contestant on Pointless Celebrities alongside fellow Hollyoaks actress Jazmine Franks.

== Personal life ==
Since 2019, Tag has been in a relationship with beauty therapist Abi Harrison. They announced the birth of their son in June 2021. In April 2023, the couple announced they were expecting a second child.

== Filmography ==
=== Film ===
Year	Title	Role	Notes	Ref.
2020	S.A.M.	Thomas	Short film	
2021	White Wedding	Vampire Prince	Short film	
2022	Hello, Death	Ted	Short film	
2023	I'm Interesting I Swear	Brock	Short film	
2025	Departures	Jake	Film	

=== Television ===
Year	Title	Role	Notes	Ref.
2016	Hollyoaks	PSCO Rocco	1 episode	
2017	Emmerdale	Darryl	1 episode	
2018–2022, 2026	Hollyoaks	Sylver McQueen	309 episodes	
2022	Dark Phones	Mr. J	Documentary	
2022	Meet the Richardsons	Personal trainer	Guest role; 1 episode	
2022	Expend	Hero	Advertisement	
2022	Pointless Celebrities	Himself	Contestant; with Jazmine Franks	
2023	Significant Other	Dan	Guest role; 1 episode	
2025	Operation Dark Phone	Live Long	Series regular	
2025	Elementals	Ronny/Iron Ron		

== Stage ==
Year	Title	Role	Venue	Ref.
2021–2022	Goldilocks and the Three Bears	Ringmaster	St Helens Theatre Royal	
2022–2023	Goldilocks and the Three Bears	Ringmaster	Epstein Theatre	
