= Aedan Duckworth =

English actor and model

- Born: Aedan Joseph Duckworth; 10 February 2001 (age 25); Liverpool, England
- Occupations: Actor, model
- Years active: 2016–present

Aedan Joseph Duckworth (born 10 February 2001) is an English actor and model, best known for his portrayal of Oliver Morgan in the British soap opera Hollyoaks.

== Early life ==
Aedan Joseph Duckworth was born on 10 February 2001. He attended Parklands High School, Chorley.

== Career ==
=== 2016–present: Career beginnings and Hollyoaks ===
In 2016, Duckworth began his career as a television actor, with a portrayal on The Five, in which he appeared for eight episodes. A year later, he then joined the cast of Hollyoaks in autumn 2017, as character Oliver Morgan. For his portrayal of Oliver, Duckworth was nominated for Best Soap Newcomer at the 2018 Digital Spy Reader Awards; he came in fourth place with 9.4% of the total votes. The following year, Duckworth received his first National Television Awards nomination in the Newcomer category for his portrayal of Oliver. In 2020, however, it was announced that Duckworth would be leaving the soap, with the character of Oliver being recast to Gabriel Clark.

Duckworth is set to appear in the feature film Jackie the Stripper, alongside Katie Price and Patsy Kensit.

In November 2025, it was announced that a web series of ten ten-minute episodes, titled Armour, was in production; Duckworth stars as Mason Wharton in the series.

== Filmography ==
Key
†	Denotes films that have not yet been released

Film
Year	Title	Role	Notes
TBA	Jackie the Stripper †	TBA	Currently in post-production

Television
Year	Title	Role	Notes
2016	The Five	Young Mark	8 episodes
2017	Love, Lies and Records	Jaden	1 episode
2018–2020	Hollyoaks	Oliver Morgan	192 episodes
2023	Doctors	Tim Walker	1 episode; Series 24 Episode 111: "A Little Death"

Web series
Year	Title	Role	Notes
TBA	Armour	Mason Wharton	Currently in production
