= Tip Toe (TV series) =

British television series

- Genre: Drama; Dark comedy; Psychological thriller
- Created by: Russell T Davies
- Written by: Russell T Davies
- Directed by: Peter Hoar
- Starring: Alan Cumming; David Morrissey
- Music by: Sam Watts
- Country of origin: United Kingdom
- Original language: English
- No. of episodes: 5

Production
- Executive producers: Russell T Davies; Nicola Shindler; Alan Cumming; Peter Hoar
- Producer: Phil Collinson
- Cinematography: Matt Gray
- Editors: Tim Hodges; Joe Hodges
- Running time: 43-47 minutes
- Production companies: Quay Street Productions; ITV Studios

Original release
- Network: Channel 4
- Release: 31 May – 9 June 2026

Tip Toe is a 2026 British television psychological thriller miniseries for Channel 4, written by Russell T Davies and starring Alan Cumming and David Morrissey.

== Premise ==
Tip Toe is a miniseries starring two next-door neighbours in Manchester — Leo Struthers, the gay owner of the Canal Street bar Spit and Polish, and his long-standing neighbour Clive Goss, an electrician. The show explores the effects of anti-LGBTQ rhetoric on social media, leading the neighbours to gradually become deadly enemies. Events unfold involving Clive's son George and online conspiracy theories, before the series reaches its conclusion.

== Cast ==
- Alan Cumming as Leo Struthers. Born in Scotland, Leo runs a bar called Spit and Polish on Manchester's Canal Street
- David Morrissey as Clive Goss, Leo's next-door neighbour and an electrician
- Elizabeth Berrington as Stephanie Dale, Leo's supportive straight friend
- Denise Welch as Diane
- Pooky Quesnel as Marie Goss, Clive's wife
- Jackson Connor as George Goss, Clive and Marie's 16-year-old son
- Joseph Evans as Saul Goss, Clive and Marie's 25-year-old son
- Iz Hesketh as Zee Malone
- Luyanda Unati Lewis-Nyawo as Judy Khumalo
- Gabriel Clark as Mikey Driscoll
- Shakeel Kimotho as Hanna Ayomide
- Paul Rhys as Melba
- Charlie Condou as Curtis Baxter
- Jolyon Benson as Frederic Hopper

== Episodes ==
No.	Title	Directed by	Written by	Original release date	Viewers (millions)
1	"Episode 1"	Peter Hoar	Russell T Davies	31 May 2026	2.35
In a flashforward, a crowd of people gather to see Leo hanged from a streetlamp. Ten days earlier, Leo has just had a one-night stand with a man. The man steals his laptop, and Leo runs outside to chase him, but fails and also locks himself out of his house dressed only in pants and a t-shirt. This forces him to knock on his neighbour Clive's door, where he asks if he can call his best friend, Stephanie, who has a spare key. Clive agrees, but later suggests that Leo give him a key for emergencies, and Leo hires him to help at his bar. One of Leo's employees, Zee, has been sleeping at the bar since her home has become unsafe since coming out as transgender, so Leo and the other employees help her pack and move. Leo and his friend Melba discuss the situation, with Melba frustrated at Leo's denial of the danger their community is in, in the present day. Leo discovers George, Clive's teenage son, on his dating app.
2	"Episode 2"	Peter Hoar	Russell T Davies	1 June 2026 (Note: Episode 2 was released on the Channel 4 streaming service alongside episode 1 on 31 May.)	N/A
In a flashforward, George watches silently from his room as Leo is hanged outside. Clive shows increasing discomfort around Leo and his employees, two of whom are transgender. Leo also hires Clive's eldest son, Saul, to work at the bar. Leo and George communicate through the app, with Leo giving George advice and hiding his sexuality from Clive.
3	"Episode 3"	Peter Hoar	Russell T Davies	7 June 2026	N/A
In a flashforward, police arrest Clive for Leo's murder. In the present, Clive has a struggling marriage with Marie and a strained relationship with his sons, especially George. Clive and Leo return home to find George hiding in Leo's flat, with Clive assaulting Leo and accusing him of luring his son over. Leo threatens to call the police, which Stephanie encourages, but Leo ultimately chooses not to out of fear for his safety. George runs away, but Saul finds him and convinces him to return home. Marie is worried George will be charged with burglary, whilst Clive accuses Leo of being a predator. Clive breaks into Leo's house and finds Saul's OnlyFans account as well as the message exchanges between him and George, which he documents. Leo returns home to find him there.
4	"Episode 4"	Peter Hoar	Russell T Davies	8 June 2026 (Note: Episodes 4 and 5 were released on the Channel 4 streaming service alongside episode 3 on 7 June.)	N/A
In a flashforward, Stephanie and Zee attempt to protect Leo's house from an angry mob. Two days earlier, Leo calls the police on Clive, but tells them it was a mistake after Clive threatens to frame him for paedophilia. Clive and Leo attempt to have a conversation, which devolves into an argument as Clive accuses Leo of infecting George, and ends up leaving in a rage. Stephanie begs Leo to move, but he believes it will all calm down soon. Saul becomes worried about his dad after realising he has found his account. Zee contacts George and he helps her choose her new name, and the pair go to the Northern Quarter together. Clive goes to Leo's bar and ends up helping them when a man assaults the DJ. Leo admits that he has been HIV positive for thirty-two years, but Clive dismisses HIV as fake. In a conversation with Stephanie, Leo expresses concern about Clive.
5	"Episode 5"	Peter Hoar	Russell T Davies	9 June 2026	N/A
Leo and Stephanie argue about the best way to help George, with Stephanie believing Marie would be supportive. Saul sees the photo of George wearing makeup and partying with Zee and her friends, he expresses support but warns George about his friends possible reactions. The Gosses host a football livestream during which George is violently hazed. Zee is unable to delete the photo, and goes to George's house, but he rejects her help. Clive sees Zee, and Leo agrees to help her by talking to Clive. The confrontation soon devolves into violence, with the Gosses' friends exposing both Saul's account and George's photos to their parents. Upon seeing Zee with George, Clive attacks Leo and accuses him of taking advantage of George. George refutes this, stating Leo has HIV. After the video of Clive helping Leo during the fight is exposed, Clive whips the crowd into a frenzy and take Leo outside to hang him with electricity cable. Saul desperately attempts to prevent them, but is unsuccessful, as he is being restrained by his friends. Marie, in her room with music at a high volume, isn’t aware of what’s going on until it’s too late. Ultimately, Clive and his accomplices are arrested for murder, George becomes a drug-addict, Saul gets married and lives happily, Zee chooses the name Sarah and becomes a teacher, and the bar is turned into a pizzeria. Two years prior, Stephanie and Leo discuss his divorce, and the effects that coming out has had on their lives. Leo expresses a belief that something big will happen.

== Production ==
The series was commissioned by Channel 4 in February 2025. It is written by Russell T Davies and produced by Nicola Shindler for Quay Street Productions with Phil Collinson as a series producer, and Peter Hoar as series director. Davies, Hoar and Alan Cumming are executive producers. Cumming also leads the cast with David Morrissey. The wider cast includes Elizabeth Berrington, Denise Welch and Pooky Quesnel, amongst others.

Filming began in Manchester in September 2025.

== Broadcast ==
The first episode was broadcast on Channel 4 on 31 May 2026. Episodes 1 and 2 were released on the streaming on demand service also called Channel 4 on that day. Episode 2 aired on 1 June, and episodes 3, 4, and 5 aired across consecutive days on 7–9 June. The three episodes were released on streaming on 7 June.

=== International airings ===
In Australia it is available on Binge. In New Zealand it is available on TVNZ+. In the United States the series was acquired by Starz, which aired on 2 October 2026. It premiered in Spain on HBO Max on 16 July 2026.

== Reception ==
The series received a positive reception from both the public and reviewers, garnering four stars or above from publications such as The Guardian, The Independent, and the Financial Times. There has been criticism of its handling of gender-critical feminism and downplaying the impact of that on trans rights.

On review aggregator website Rotten Tomatoes, the series holds an approval rating of 96% based on 26 reviews, with an average rating of 8.6/10.
