= Gabriel Clark (actor) =

British actor

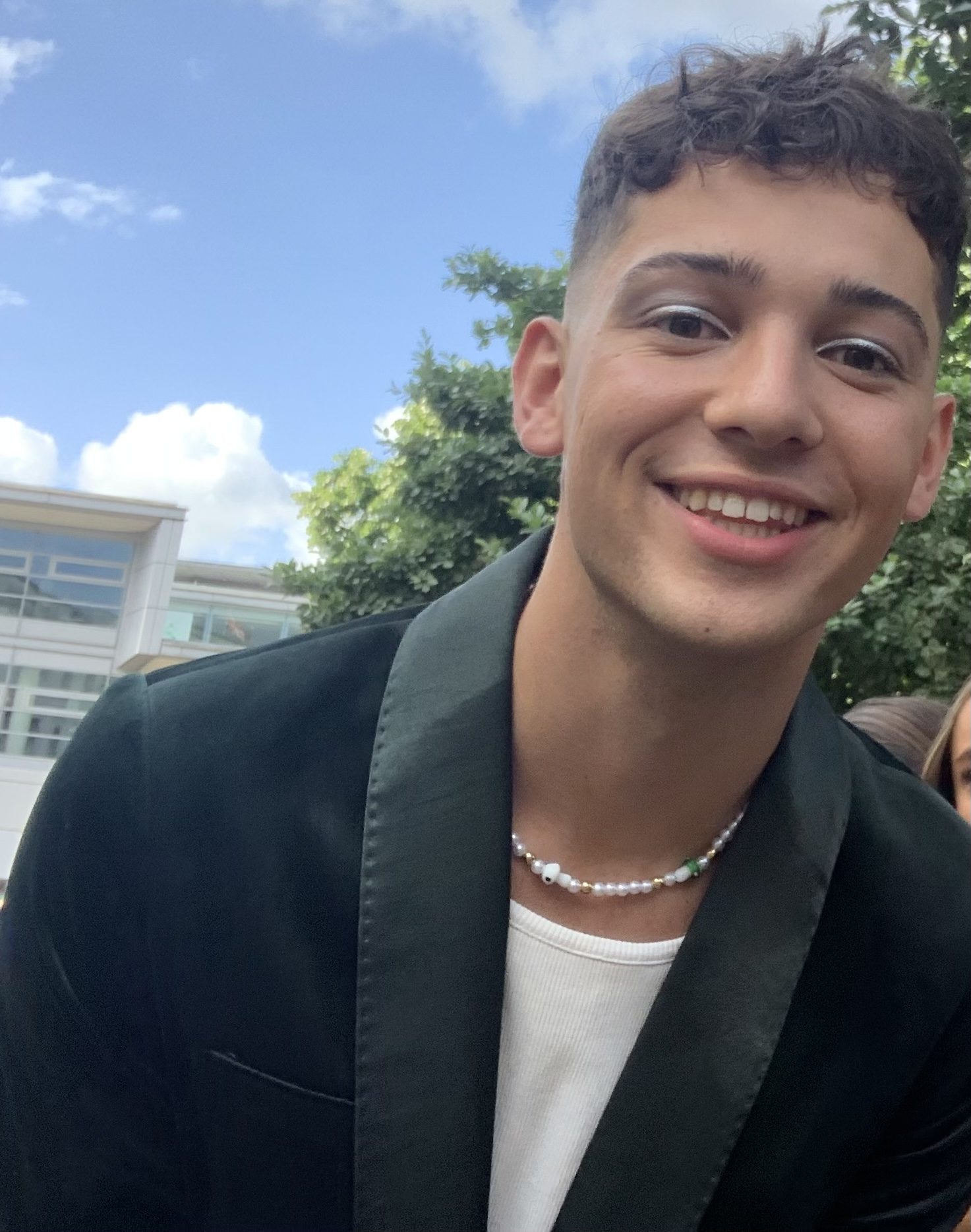
- Clark in 2022
- Born: Gabriel William Clark; November 1998 (age 27–28); Bolton, Greater Manchester, England
- Occupations: Actor, director, writer
- Years active: 2014–present

Gabriel Clark (born 1998) is an English actor, theatre director and writer from Bolton. Clark trained as an actor in the Greater Manchester theatre, the Royal Exchange and graduated from University of Manchester. Clark began his career securing small roles in BBC television series. He then secured roles in British soap operas, later playing the role of Oliver Morgan in Hollyoaks. He left the series in 2022 to concentrate on his theatre career. He became a writer and director for the theatre company Switch MCR, while continuing to pursue his acting career. In 2026, Clark appeared as Mikey Driscoll in the drama series, Tip Toe.

== Early life ==
Clark was born in Bolton, Greater Manchester and grew up in the town's Harwood suburb. He is of British-Sardinian heritage. Clark's father is a guitarist and his mother is an opera singer. During his younger years spent time backstage at his mother's shows, which he credited as introducing him to showbusiness. Clark attended Hardy Mill primary school where he participated in drama classes. He then attended Turton School where he took on lead roles in their amateur productions.

He became interested in theatre and regularly attended the Octagon Theatre in Bolton. He later became an employee at the theatre, working as an usher for five years. Clark then studied English Literature and Drama at University of Manchester, where he graduated with First Class BA (Hons). He also trained at the Royal Exchange Theatre Young Company. Clark did not attend drama school but cited these accomplishments as his training for the acting industry.

== Career ==
Clark began his career appearing the theatre productions and securing small roles in BBC shows, including Grim Up North and 4 O'Clock Club. In 2019, Clark played the role of Chris Neeson in the British soap opera, Hollyoaks. His character was portrayed as a witness in the trial. That year he also secured another soap opera guest role in Coronation Street. In 2020, Clark joined the regular cast of Hollyoaks, playing the role of Oliver Morgan. The character had been recast to Clark following the departure of Aedan Duckworth. Clark described securing a regular television role as a "very surreal" experience. Clark was in his third year of University when he secured the role and completed his course alongside full-time filming commitments to Hollyoaks.

In June 2022, Clark announced his departure from Hollyoaks and had filmed his final scenes as Oliver. Clark decided to return to theatre work and secured a director role on a play. Oliver's departure storyline featured him moving to Canada to become a football coach. In 2023, Clark reprised the role of Oliver for one episode.

Clark co-founded the Manchester based theatre company, Switch_MCR and assumed the role of Artistic Director. He went onto produce, direct and perform in various plays for the company. Clark co-wrote and directed the play, The Other Side, which debuted at 53two. The play received the 2022 Offie for Independent Theatre. In 2023, Clark took on a role of Wilfred in the Octagon Theatre production of Spring and Port Wine.

In 2024, Clark appeared in The Stuff of Legend, the 25th Anniversary special of Big Finish Doctor Who audio dramas full-cast live recording event at Cadogan Hall in London. Later that year he helped form a performance company branded "Sixth House" via Manchester's Lowry. In 2025, they staged their first production titled Lives. That year, he played AJ in Hive North's production of Jock Night, which toured at the Hope Mill Theatre and Seven Dials Playhouse. He then filmed the role of a detective constable, Lucas in a film titled, The Power of Authority. Clark was also cast in the Russell T Davies penned television series, Tip Toe. He took on the role of barman, Mikey Driscoll who works in a nightclub. The series debuted on Channel 4 in 2026 and Clark described his character as "very cheeky", "flirty" and unbothered "about the consequences or retribution".

In 2026, Clark played the main role in Hive North's revival production of The Night Larry Kramer Kissed Me, which saw him return to the Hope Mill Theatre and Seven Dials Playhouse. Alongside the show Clark interviewed activists and LGBT+ figures, including activists from ACT UP, and Russell T Davies. Clark was nominated for Best Solo Performance at the Fringe Theatre Awards for the show, with critics noting an "outstanding performance from Gabriel Clark."

== Personal life ==
Clark is openly gay. He came out aged 20 and has spoken about the importance of being open about his sexuality, after growing up not seeing gay actors on screen. He has also been vocal about his support for Trans rights and Palestine.

While Clark had shared anecdotes in interviews, such coming out to his mother with a photograph of a man he was dating, he never actively shared information regarding his relationship status, until confirming he is dating the model Joefrey Klein in November 2026.

== Filmography ==
Television

Year	Title	Role	Notes
2014	4 O'Clock Club	Prefect	Guest role
2017	Grim Up North	Jake	Guest role
2019	Coronation Street	Sam	Guest role
2019	Hollyoaks	Chris Neeson	Guest role
2020–2023	Hollyoaks	Oliver Morgan	Regular role
2022	Hollyoaks: Ollie's Diaries	Oliver Morgan	Regular role
2026	Tip Toe	Mikey Driscoll	Regular role

Film

Year	Title	Role	Notes
TBA	The Power of Authority	Lucas Young	Film role
TBA	Monsters	Thomas	Film role

Theatre

Year	Title	Role	Notes
2022	The Other Side	Director	Switch_MCR
2023	Spring and Port Wine	Wilfred Crompton	Octagon Theatre
2025	LIVES	Multiple	Lowry Theatre, Sixth House Theatre
2025	Jock Night	AJ	Hope Mill Theatre, Seven Dials Playhouse
2026	The Night Larry Kramer Kissed Me	Performer	Hope Mill Theatre, Seven Dials Playhouse

Audio

Year	Title	Role	Notes
2024	Doctor Who: The Stuff of Legend	Multiple	Big Finish
