= Cher Winters =

Fictional character from Hollyoaks

- Hollyoaks character
- Portrayed by: Bethannie Hare
- Duration: 2020–2022
- First appearance: Episode 5415; 1 June 2020
- Last appearance: Episode 5779; 3 February 2022
- Introduced by: Bryan Kirkwood
In-universe information
- Other names: Cher McQueen
- Occupation: Barmaid
- Family: McQueen
- Father: Sylver McQueen
- Mother: Kelly Winters
- Stepmother: Mercedes McQueen
- Half-brothers: Jake Winters; Bobby Costello (adoptive)
- Half-sisters: Liza Winters
- Aunts: Goldie McQueen (adoptive)
- First cousins: Prince McQueen (adoptive)

Cher McQueen (also Winters) is a fictional character from the Channel 4 soap opera Hollyoaks, played by Bethannie Hare. Cher is introduced as the estranged daughter of Sylver McQueen (David Tag) and is welcomed into the established McQueen family unit. Hare described her character as someone with attitude and strong family values, likening Cher to other McQueens on the soap. Portraying the role of Cher is Hare's first professional acting role and she admitted that she was initially nervous to join the cast of Hollyoaks, but accredited her co-stars with easing her nerves. She made her debut appearance as Cher on 1 June 2020. Her storylines in the seriew have included the revelation that she killed her younger sister, her tumultuous relationship with her stepmother Mercedes McQueen (Jennifer Metcalfe), her romantic relationship with Romeo Nightingale (Owen Warner), learning that Romeo and Mercedes have been having an affair, a suicide attempt due to feeling isolated, and dealing with the death of her father Sylver in an explosion.

Cher is introduced as having a secret, which is later revealed to be her accidentally having killed her half-sister Liza. Hare expressed shock at the secret but felt that knowing more about Cher's backstory allowed her to feel connected to her character. After Mercedes exposes Cher's secret to everybody in the village, Cher begins taking revenge on her in a long-running storyline that sees her "embrace her dark side". Some of her actions include framing Mercedes for taking drugs, pouring baby oil on the floor for her to trip over, leaking a sex tape she features, sending her anonymous online hate comments, tricking her into believing she is pregnant and framing her for kidnap. Stephen Patterson of the Metro felt that Cher "made one heck of an entrance" and she was subsequently nominated for Best Newcomer at the I Talk Telly Awards. Patterson described Cher as cruel following her actions to Mercedes, but praised both Hare and the character following Cher's suicide attempt. Hare has defended her character, stating that she is not evil and is instead lonely.

On 3 February 2022, Cher departs the village in Hare's final scenes, which were previously unannounced. Cher's exit sees her decide to mend her relationship with her mother, Kelly Winters (Jenny Wickham), due to the impact that Sylver's death had on her. Hare had planned to appear on the soap for two years from the beginning of her tenure and she told the producers in advance so that they could prepare her character's exit, which she felt was apt for Cher. She was proud of the journey that her character had been on in her two years on Hollyoaks and stated that her favourite storyline to film was Cher's suicide attempt, which she worked with the Samaritans on. Patterson wrote that she would be missed and felt that she "became part of the show's very fabric" in her time on the soap.

== Casting ==
The character and Bethannie Hare's casting details were announced on 12 April 2020. Hare was with her mother when she learned that she had received the part, and exclaimed aloud: "oh my God I've got a part in Hollyoaks!" She admitted that she was nervous to join Hollyoaks, but the support from the cast members helped to ease her nerves. She described the cast as a family and stated that she learns new things from her co-stars daily. In a video for the Hollyoaks social media channels, Hare stated that the response to her casting announcement was positive, which made her excited to film upcoming storylines. Prior to her arrival, there was a scene that implies that Sylver had only had sex with Mercedes McQueen (Jennifer Metcalfe). This led viewers to assume that Cher could be Mercedes' daughter. Justin Harp of Digital Spy explained that Sylver also had sex with a prison guard and that she is Cher's mother. A month into Hare's time on the soap, filming was suspended due to the impact of the COVID-19 pandemic on television. In an interview with Duncan Lindsay for the Metro newsletter, she stated that she felt lucky to have secured the role of Cher, particularly due to the impact of the pandemic.

== Development ==
=== Characterisation ===
Cher is introduced as the long-lost daughter of Sylver McQueen (David Tag). Chris Edwards from Digital Spy stated that Cher is an aspiring hairdresser and beautician and that her arrival would bring fun and energy into the fictional village. He billed her as a fun and energetic character with strong family values. Edwards also confirmed that Cher's motive for moving to the village was to find out more about her father, since the only piece of information she knows prior to meeting him is that he is a convicted murderer. On her character, Hare stated that Cher has an attitude, but is also caring, family-orientated and that she will always be there for somebody if they need her, comparing her to the other McQueen family members, a family she was excited to join.

James Sutton, who portrays John Paul McQueen, described Cher as gobby, confident and outgoing. He stated that she "even dresses like a McQueen", and likened her to Mercedes. Tag expressed his joy at the creation of Cher, as it could add longevity to his own character. He described Cher as "beautiful, ballsy, bolshy and a bit of a diva", labelling her a "classic McQueen" and joking that he would not want to get on the wrong side of Cher. He added that there is depth to the character, since "there is a vulnerability" inside of her.

=== Introduction and secret ===
Cher arrives in Hollyoaks village to find her biological father, Sylver. She crashes his vow renewal with wife Mercedes and blurts out in front of the guests that she is Sylver's daughter. He initially does not believe Cher and agrees to pay her to leave. Cher's mother Kelly (Jenny Wickham) later arrives and disowns her, leaving her in the care of Sylver and Mercedes. Kelly implies that Cher is harbouring a secret that led to the breakdown of their relationship. Speaking to Daniel Kilkelly of Digital Spy about the secret, Hare stated that despite Cher's sassy attitude, she keeps a lot to herself and keeps a front up, and noted that she especially does it with Sylver and love interest Romeo Nightingale (Owen Warner). She said that Cher is holding onto the secret in fear that if people discover the truth, they may dislike her. Hare did not reveal what the secret was but hinted that it may be revealed in forthcoming scenes, which would cause people to treat Cher differently. Hare added that the secret is always in the back of Cher's mind, making her feel unsafe and as though she cannot form close relationships with others. When asked if she knew of the long-term plans for her character, Hare replied that she knows a little bit, but that she discovers the majority of character information in each script she receives. She added that she was nervous but excited for her storylines, stating: "I just want to make sure I do a good job for all the viewers and everyone at Hollyoaks".

In scenes aired in October 2020, it was revealed that Cher had accidentally killed her half-sister Liza prior to her arrival in the village. Hare was shocked to discover her secret but found that the tragedy of her backstory allowed her to feel connected to her character, feeling lucky to be involved in the storyline. Hare confirmed that Cher killing Liza was an accident and hoped that the viewers would sympathise with Cher. The McQueen family are blackmailed and the anonymous blackmailer threatens to reveal Cher's secret to the village if they do not pay a large sum of money. Not wanting to pay the money, Mercedes reveals the secret herself. Mercedes' actions leave Cher in "utter shock" and she "totally loses it". The reveal of her secret leaves Cher distraught and leads her to turn to alcohol, with Hare stating that Cher spends all day and night drinking. The actress explained that Cher does not drink in a self pitying way, but that she "feels like she deserves to be damaged and deserves to pay for everything that has happened". When Cher is in a vulnerable state, she comes into contact with Silas Blissett (Jeff Rawle), the blackmailer. Since Cher does not know who Silas is, Hare states that she does not know the amount of danger she's in. Hare admitted that due to her age and not regularly watching Hollyoaks during his tenure, she was not aware of Silas and who he was. To prepare for filming the scenes, she watched old footage, which she found chilling. She expressed her excitement at being able to work with Rawle, since she recognised him from the Harry Potter film series. She stated that since Silas hates young women being "scantily clad and drinking heavily", Cher will be on his radar.

=== Relationship with Romeo Nightingale ===
Prior to her arrival, Tag hinted that Cher may form a romantic relationship with Romeo. He stated that Cher "catches the eye of local lad Romeo" and joked that Romeo should watch out due to Sylver being protective of his daughter. Upon her arrival, she flirts with Romeo to gain access to her estranged father's wedding reception. After the pair continue to interact, Goldie McQueen (Chelsee Healey) and Joel Dexter (Rory Douglas-Speed) set the pair up on a date. However, Cher treats him as a friend, which leaves him feeling secretly disappointed. Hare told Kilkelly that the pair like each other, but that they are too stubborn to admit it. She explained that Cher is embarrassed when Goldie tries to ask her about her romantic feelings, since she is her adoptive aunt, and hence does not want to tell her how she feels about Romeo. Hare went on to say that her character wants to play hard to get because she " loves the chase". Cher does not want to let Romeo in since she is worried that he will discover she killed Liza. Despite this, Hare opined that they are a good match. She commented: "You've got Romeo with his poetry and then Cher loves her magazines! They'd work well together, even though they're complete opposites". She said that due to having a similar upbringing, this similarity could bring them together and added that she enjoys working with Warner. The pair plan an illegal rave together, and Hare hinted that the outcome of the event would be that it might be what they need to finally bring them together. After Romeo reveals to Mercedes and Sylver that she took their credit card, she lashes out at him, comparing his lack of support to the death of his ex-girlfriend Lily McQueen (Lauren McQueen). She then attempts to apologise, but Mercedes suggests that she should win Romeo back through "the power of seduction". However, Romeo becomes unsure about their relationship as he begins to develop feelings for someone else. This person is revealed to be Mercedes, who he has sex with. Hare said that when the secret comes out, Cher realises she has lost the person she loves most to the person she is most jealous of, which makes her feel "as if she'll never be good enough".

=== Targeting Mercedes McQueen and online trolling ===
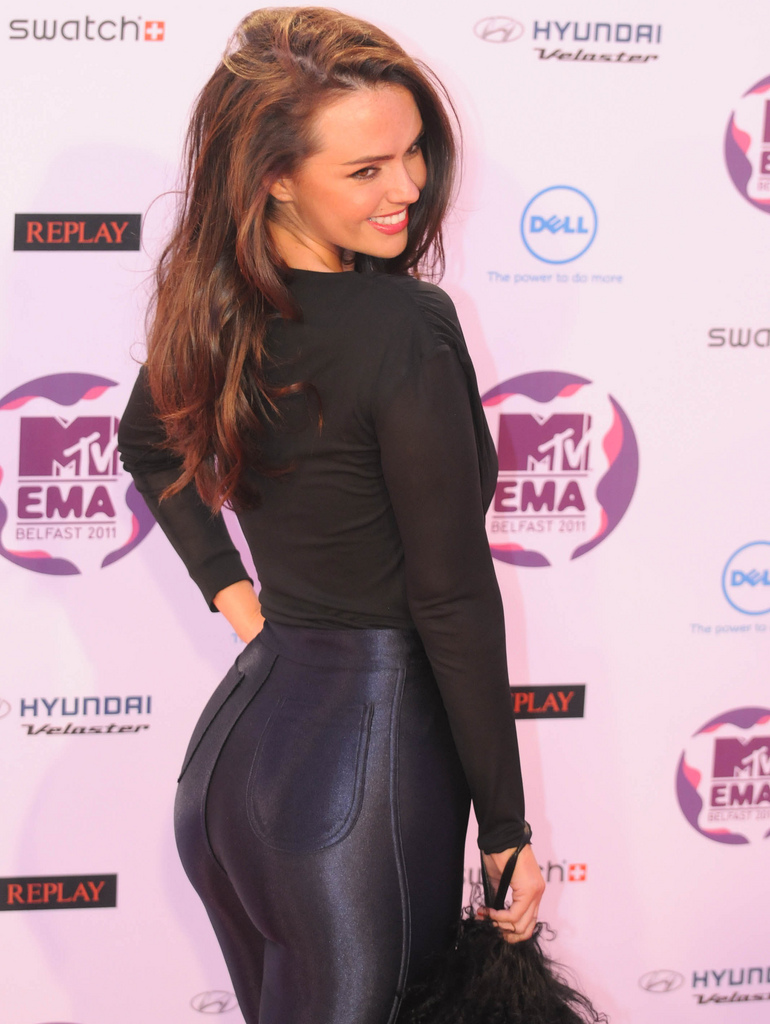
Jennifer Metcalfe portrays Mercedes McQueen, Cher's stepmother and rival.

After Mercedes announces that Cher killed her half-sister, tension begins to rise between the pair. Hare stated that viewers should not underestimate Cher and that a tougher side to her will emerge, which she felt would surprise viewers. Hare expressed her joy at Cher's personality being explored, since she felt it made her role more exciting to play. She also hinted that Cher has a "journey to go on". A revenge plot was later announced, in which Cher has "fully embraced her dark side".

After Mercedes takes the attention away from Cher's birthday, Hare states that Cher is upset because it is the first birthday she has been able to spend with Sylver. She states that Cher wants to spend her day with Sylver and does not care about anyone else being there. When he leaves to be with Mercedes, she describes it as "a punch in the face" for Cher and it makes her realise that Mercedes will always come first to him. After she learns that Mercedes is a recovering drug addict, Cher sources cocaine from a friend of Oliver Morgan's (Gabriel Clark) and plants it in Mercedes' bag to destroy her relationship with Sylver. When Mercedes discovers that Cher planted the drugs in her bag, she excuses it since she feels bad for ruining her birthday party. Mercedes states that it is not as bad as physically hurting her, but warns Cher that if she strikes again, she will not be as understanding. Sylver arranges another party for Cher, which "much to Cher's fury", Mercedes also becomes the centre of attention at. This leaves her furious with her stepmother, "driving her to do something so reckless that it puts [Mercedes] in serious danger". Cher pours baby oil across the floor which Mercedes slips over, as Cher is "watching in the wings with a gleeful smile". She then takes the credit card belonging to Mercedes' pub and goes shopping with it.

Cher continues her revenge plan by burning Mercedes with a pair of hair straighteners and purposely leaking a video of Mercedes having sex. Hare doubted that Cher had planned to burn her with the straighteners and that it instead happened in a "moment of explosion". She stated: "She's young, she's 19, she's gone through a lot and all of this has been building." Despite her behaviour, Hare stated that she does not view Cher as a villain. She admitted that Cher's actions are not right, but felt that there are reasons behind her behaviour. Cher feels betrayed by Mercedes revealing her secret regarding Liza and has not been able to look at Mercedes the same way since. Cher also wants to form a close bond with Sylver, but since Mercedes gets in the way, Cher wants her gone. Hare was asked by Kilkelly (Digital Spy) if Cher harboured the potential to kill Mercedes, drawing on her experience with killing Liza. She replied that she does not see Cher as a killer, due to being a family-focused person. Although she stated Cher has a vendetta against her, Hare did not think she was capable of killing her.

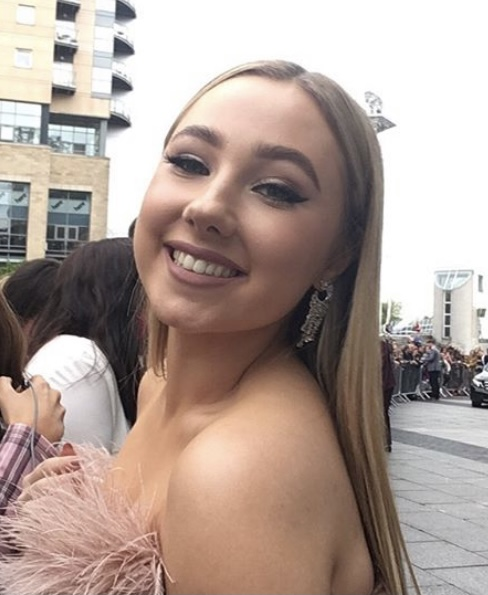
Peri Lomax (Ruby O'Donnell) eventually exposes Cher's actions.

After trolling Mercedes online, Cher makes an anti-trolling video to appear supportive of her. However, her post leads real trolls to target Cher instead. She then makes another video to address the hate she is receiving. The producers of Hollyoaks confirmed that these scenes had formed the start of a "trolling ordeal" for Cher. Mercedes attempts to comfort Cher and put the trolling to a stop with an online post, but she unknowingly makes it worse for Cher, with online trolls comparing their appearances in favour of Mercedes'. In retaliation to her being trolled even more, Cher commits her "most vile act yet". She orders numerous baby products in Mercedes' name after learning that Mercedes suffered from a stillbirth years ago, then persuades Sylver to make Mercedes a cot. Cher spies an opportunity for revenge and performs "her most twisted act to date" by dressing up as Mercedes and destroying the cot on camera.

Cher's online comments repeatedly mention a birthmark on her body, which leads her to feel insecure. She sources bleaching cream and applies it to the birthmark, which she has an adverse reaction to. Romeo pleads with nurse Peri Lomax (Ruby O'Donnell) to get Cher medication for the burns, who agrees due to dating his sister Juliet (Niamh Blackshaw). In her final act of vengeance against Mercedes, Cher kidnaps a newborn Eva Hutchinson and plants her with Mercedes. Peri discovers what she has done and threatens to expose her, but Cher insists that she will expose Peri for getting medication if she does. Mercedes checks herself into a rehabilitation centre due to believing she is mentally unwell, but upon her release, Peri accidentally exposes Cher to her. On the secret coming out, Hare told Inside Soap that it is the worst moment of Cher's life since she fears she could lose her newly found family. The reason for all of her actions is wanting to be close to Sylver and she becomes petrified by the thought of losing him due to a plan she never intended to become so dark. Mercedes confronts her, but after realising that all of Cher's actions stem from not having a family growing up, she agrees to forgive Cher.

=== Suicide attempt, grief and departure ===
In September 2021, Hollyoaks announced that Cher would be the focus of an issue-based storyline involving a suicide attempt. Metro described the scenes as Cher hitting "rock bottom". After being rejected by both Sylver and Romeo for her actions, she tries to flirt with Warren Fox (Jamie Lomas) as an attempt for attention. He rejects her and she runs away in the rain; she posts a status online stating that she wishes she had somebody to talk to. Bobby Costello (Jayden Fox) sees the post and shows Sylver, who rushes to find Cher. He sees her standing over the local dock, but before Sylver can reach her, Cher jumps in. She is admitted to hospital where Sylver leaves her; doctor Misbah Maalik (Harvey Virdi) gets her to accept help. Hare spoke to the Samaritans and people who had attempted suicide prior to filming the storyline, as she wanted the scenes to be honest and accurate. She felt pressure to portray the topic accurately and was proud with the outcome, feeling that if she had helped at least one person, that would be amazing. In January 2022, it was confirmed that Cher and members of her family would be involved in a stunt that would see at least one death. When the Salon de Thé explodes, Cher becomes trapped under the rubble and Mercedes, who is also in the building, struggles to retrieve her from underneath. Sylver finds the pair and helps to save them, but later returns inside to save Bobby, where Sylver dies. After his death, Cher comforts everybody in the family and Hare noted that by distracting herself with others, Cher does not allow herself time to grieve. The grief also leads her to "get caught up in certain situations that she ends up regretting", including kissing a married Tom Cunningham (Ellis Hollins).

After attending Sylver's funeral, Cher announces her surprise decision to mend her relationship with her mother due to realising that life is too short to not have close family relationships. She leaves the village and this marked Hare's previously unannounced exit from Hollyoaks. Hare was emotional to leave the soap but knew from the moment she was cast as Cher that she wanted to stay on the series for around two years, a decision she told the producers in advance. She appreciated the way her exit was written, feeling that Cher's decision was apt due to her character growth over her time in the village. Hare was asked if she would have preferred for Cher to die in the stunt, but she felt that the canon ending was better due to the viewers being able to see her growth after her father's death. Hare's favourite storyline in her time on the series was Cher's suicide attempt; she felt that it was a turning point for Cher and allowed the viewers to "understand why she was doing what she was doing, and they realised that her mental health wasn't great". She hoped that following her exit, viewers would remember the evolved Cher rather than earlier versions, such as being there for her family and holding the McQueens together. On Cher's journey, Hare said: "she's s a young girl who has just completely grown. It's so sad what happened at the end [with Sylver's death], but you see how far she's come, and what an amazing person [she is] – with all the stuff she’s gone through in her life, and she’s still being there for everyone else."

== Reception ==
Stephen Patterson of the Metro wrote that Cher's introduction on the series was a "proper McQueen welcome" and that she had "made one heck of an entrance". For her portrayal of Cher, Hare was nominated for Best Soap Newcomer at the 2020 I Talk Telly Awards. On Cher's secret being revealed, Hare anticipated that the audience would start to hate Cher for being a killer, but stated that the reaction has been nice. She expressed her gratitude that people can see that Cher did not intend to murder Liza and was thankful that "the guilt is coming across" to the viewers. After Cher's actions to Mercedes, she was described as "cruel" by Patterson. Eden-Olivia Lord, writing for Closer, was grateful when "Cher's evil ways" were exposed to Mercedes.

Hare noted that the reaction to Cher during the gaslighting storyline was negative and that she was seen as the villain of the soap. However, as the storyline progressed, fans noticed Cher's poor mental health and the reasons for her behaviour, which she accredited to making fans eventually love Cher. Patterson described Cher's suicide attempt as "emotional" and branded Hare's performance as "superb" for her part in the storyline. Following the news of Hare's departure, Patterson labelled her one of the "finest" characters and felt that in her time on Hollyoaks, she "became part of the show's very fabric".

== See also ==
- List of soap opera villains
