= Departures (2025 film) =

2025 film by Neil Ely and Lloyd Eyre-Morgan

- Theatrical poster
- Directed by: Neil Ely; Lloyd Eyre-Morgan
- Written by: Lloyd Eyre-Morgan
- Produced by: Neil Ely; Lloyd Eyre-Morgan; Paul Mortlock
- Starring: Lloyd Eyre-Morgan; David Tag; Liam Boyle
- Cinematography: Paul Mortlock
- Music by: Stephanie Singer
- Production company: Punk Spirit Productions
- Distributed by: Peccadillo Pictures (United Kingdom); Strand Releasing (United States)
- Release date: 2025
- Running time: 82 minutes
- Country: United Kingdom
- Language: English

Departures is a 2025 British LGBT romantic comedy-drama, directed by Neil Ely and Lloyd Eyre-Morgan, who also wrote and starred in the film.

== Plot ==
Benji meets Jake at an airport gate and they begin a relationship which unfolds through trips, intimacy, and complex power dynamics.

== Cast ==
- Lloyd Eyre-Morgan as Benji
  - Olly Rhodes and Young Benji
- David Tag as Jake
  - Jacob Partali as Young Jake
- Liam Boyle as Kieran
- Ali Afzal as Robby
- Tyler Conti as Ryan
- Anthony Crank as Dom Top
- Kimberly Hart-Simpson as Vanessa
- Jake Haymes as Tommy
- Kerry Howard as Jackie
- Saira Choudhry as Olivia
- Phil James as Tony
- Kelsea Knox as Abby
- Andrew Purcell as Adam
- Lorraine Stanley as Janet
- Olivier Sublet as Noah
- Christopher Thompson as John Paul
- Georgia Rae Thompson as Zoe

== Release ==
The film premiered at the Manchester Film Festival in 2025 and was later picked up by Peccadillo Pictures in the United Kingdom and Strand Releasing in the United States for a 2026 theatrical release.

== Reception ==
The Guardian said the film "remains a highly thoughtful exploration of love and identity, and an excellent showcase for northern talents on film."
