= Misha Timmins =

- Born: 19 June 1987 (age 39)

Comedy career
- Years active: 2005–present
- Medium: Television, film

Misha Timmins (born 19 June 1987) is an English actress.

== Biography ==
Misha Timmins, from Worsley, attended Bridgewater School and went onto study Musical Theatre at Pendleton College, Salford. Her first big break was in comedy drama series, The A to Z of Everything in 2005. She was also a cheerleader for Sale Sharks and Warrington Wolves.

Since 2013, Timmins regularly appears as Cindy in the BBC One sitcom, Still Open All Hours. In 2014, Timmins took on the role of Fat Brenda's daughter in Steve McDonald and Lloyd Mullaney's online Coronation Street spinoff, Streetcar Stories.

== Filmography ==
| Year | Title | Role | Notes |
|---|---|---|---|
| 2005 | The A to Z of Everything | Gina | |
| 2011 | Candy Cabs | Kendra | 2 episodes |
| 2011 | Shameless | Vicky Brixton | 1 episode |
| 2013 | Way To Go | Claudia | Episode: 'The Be All & End All' |
| 2013 | Doctors | Beckie Fielding | Episode: 'Coping' |
| 2013-2016 | Still Open All Hours | Cindy | |
| 2015 | My House Party | Rita | |
