= Moya Brady =

English actress (born 1962)

- Born: 8 September 1962 (age 64); Manchester, Lancashire, England
- Occupation: Actress
- Years active: 1986–present
- Television: The Bill (1995, 2002–2003); Shameless (2005, 2013); Hollyoaks (2018–2020)

Moya Brady (born 8 September 1962) is an English actress. Her roles include Breda McQueen on the Channel 4 soap opera Hollyoaks from 2018 to 2020.

Brady grew up in the seaside town of Blackpool, Lancashire, England. She has appeared in a wide variety of roles in film, television and the theatre, including a role as F.D.O. Roberta Cryer in the police drama series, The Bill and Harry Hill's TV Burp. Brady's 2009 films include The Imaginarium of Doctor Parnassus and The Soloist. She appeared in the Doctor Who episode "Love & Monsters" as Bridget in 2006. In 2021, she played the role of Millie in Russell T Davies’ Channel 4 series It's a Sin.

Brady is a long-term close friend of her former The Bill co-star Connie Hyde, who played Roberta Cryer's nemesis PC Cathy Bradford.

== Selected credits ==
- Road (1987) as Clare
- Little Dorrit (1988) as the Fiddler's Daughter
- Life Is Sweet (1990) as Paula
- Making Out (1989–1991) as Klepto
- Men Behaving Badly (1992) as Dorothy's friend
- Wide-Eyed and Legless (1993) as Sheila
- The NeverEnding Story III (1994) as Urgl
- The Bill (1995) as Stacey McNab – Guest; 1 episode
- Mary Reilly (1996) as Young Woman
- Peak Practice (2000) as Madeline Castle
- Gimme Gimme Gimme (2000) as Maddie
- The Emperor's New Clothes (2001) as Woman
- The Bill (2002–2003) as Roberta Cryer – Series regular; 71 episodes
- Shameless (2005) as Cassie Western
- My Hero (2000) as Avril
- Pride & Prejudice (2005) as Lambton Maid
- Doctor Who (2006) episode: "Love & Monsters" as Bridget – Guest; 1 episode
- Mayo (2006) as Miriam Thorne
- Scoop (2006) as Screamer
- The Chase (2006) as Cindy
- Casualty (2006) as Liz Criddick
- Doctors (2000 and 2006) as Eileen Groves and Maggie Wolfe
- M.I. High (2007) as the Guinea pig – Guest; 1 episode
- The Soloist (2009) as Barely Dressed Woman
- The Imaginarium of Doctor Parnassus (2009) as Auntie Flo
- Shameless (2013) as Remona
- Josh (2016) episode: "Planks & Pranks" as Sophie's Mother
- Hollyoaks (2018–2020) as Breda McQueen – Series regular; 161 episodes
- Hollyoaks Later (2020) as Breda McQueen – 2020 special
- It’s A Sin (2021) as Millie
