= Juliet Nightingale =

Fictional character from Hollyoaks

- Hollyoaks character
- Portrayed by: Niamh Blackshaw
- Duration: 2018–2023
- First appearance: Episode 5032; 21 November 2018
- Last appearance: Episode 6161; 24 July 2023
- Introduced by: Bryan Kirkwood
In-universe information
- Other names: Juliet Quinn
- Occupation: Drug dealer; Waitress; Cook
- Father: Mac Nightingale
- Mother: Donna-Marie Quinn
- Stepmother: Marnie Nightingale
- Half-brothers: Romeo Nightingale; James Nightingale; Nathan Nightingale; Alfie Nightingale
- Half-sisters: Ellie Nightingale
- Nephews: Romeo Nightingale

Juliet Nightingale (also Quinn) is a fictional character from the British Channel 4 soap opera Hollyoaks, played by Niamh Blackshaw. Hollyoaks announced the character and Blackshaw's casting on 4 September 2018, with the character making her first appearance as Juliet on 21 November 2018. Juliet was introduced as the half-sister of Romeo Nightingale (Owen Warner) and the daughter of Donna-Marie Quinn (Lucy-Jo Hudson) and was brought into the soap as part of the decision to expand their family. Juliet is later revealed to be Mac Nightingale's (David Easter) daughter. The shock twist links her to the established Nightingale family, especially Marnie (Lysette Anthony), who she forms a close bond with. Juliet is initially shown to be an aggressive and harsh character, with an initial storyline seeing her bully Brooke Hathaway (Tylan Grant) due to seeing them as an easy target. However, throughout her tenure, her vulnerable and emotional personality has been explored.

Later storylines see Juliet form a relationship with Sid Sumner (Billy Price), as well as getting groomed into a county lines drug trafficking ring. A flashforward scene aired at the end of 2019 sees Juliet admitting her love for Peri Lomax (Ruby O'Donnell) and kissing her. The scene formed the start of a sexuality arc that was previously unannounced. The storyline sees her questioning and eventually accepting being a lesbian, before admitting her feelings for Peri and the pair getting together. Both actresses have praised their onscreen relationship and enjoyed working together. After Juliet's release from prison following her involvement in the drug ring, Blackshaw hoped that she would settle in the village and form a meaningful relationship with Peri. However, the pair are stalked, manipulated and spied on by Timmy Simons (Sam Tutty), as well as being involved in an explosion that leads to Juliet and Peri's engagement.

2022 saw the character have an affair with Nadira Valli (Ashling O'Shea) before reconciling with Peri, as well as being diagnosed with lymphoma, a type of blood cancer. It was eventually confirmed that Juliet's cancer would result in her death after Blackshaw had made the decision to leave after five years as a mainstay on Hollyoaks. Juliet's final scenes aired on 8 June 2023. For her portrayal of Juliet, Blackshaw was nominated for Best Newcomer at the 2019 Inside Soap Awards and later the British Soap Award for Best Leading Performer in 2023. Viewers of the series showed a positive reception to Juliet's relationship with Peri, with many rooting for them to stay together throughout their tumultuous storylines. They have also been given the portmanteau "Jeri" by viewers.

== Casting and characterisation ==
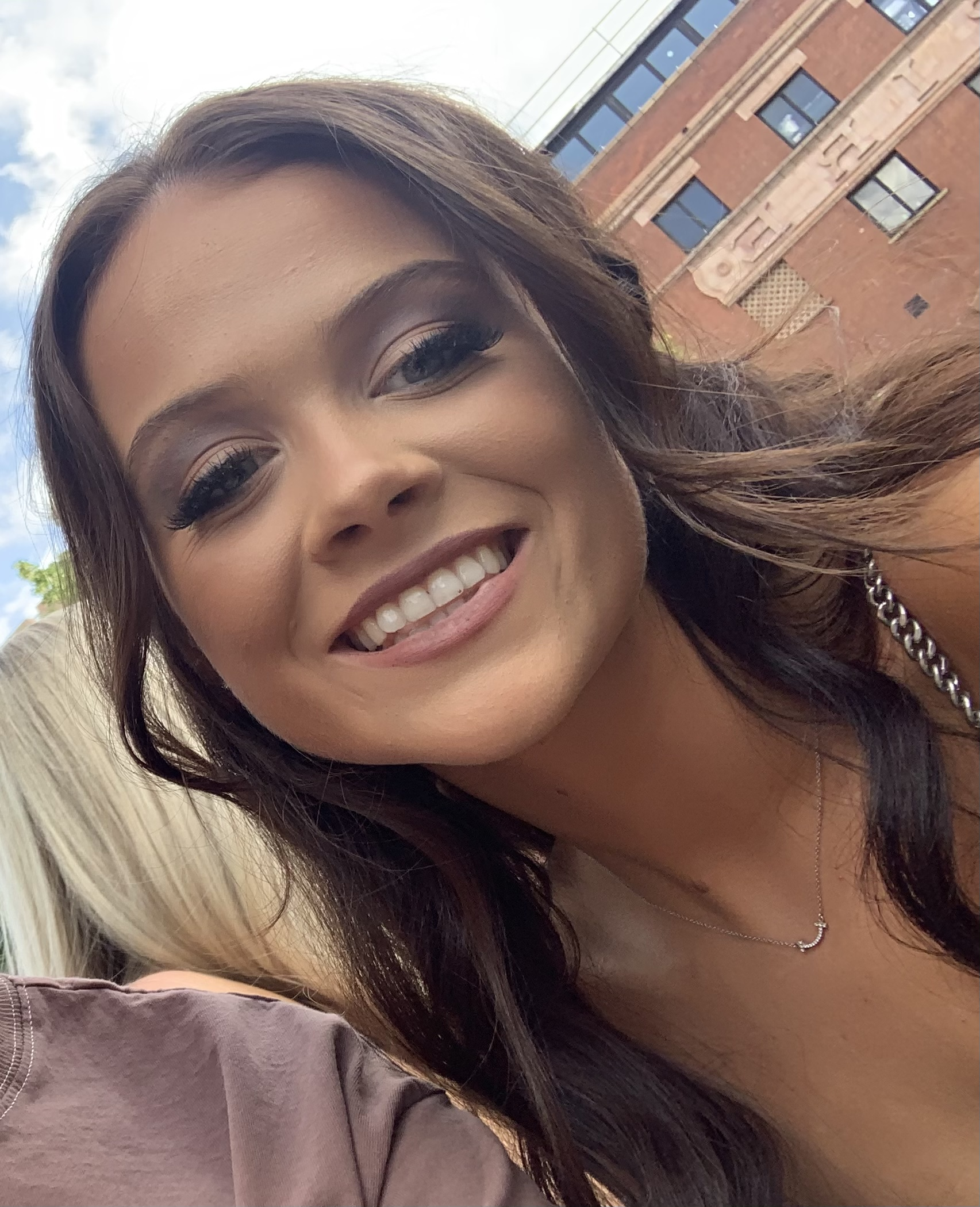
Blackshaw enjoyed portraying both an aggressive and caring side to Juliet.

The character and Niamh Blackshaw's casting details were announced on 4 September 2018. The reasoning behind Juliet's introduction was due to a decision to expand the existing Quinn family. Juliet is introduced as a new Year 11 student at Hollyoaks High School, placing her in direct scenes with established characters Imran Maalik (Ijaz Rana), Oliver Morgan (Aedan Duckworth) and Brooke Hathaway (Tylan Grant). She was billed as a "damaged and vulnerable young girl who lashes out at the world by bullying others". Blackshaw expressed her excitement at joining the cast and said that she was extremely grateful to receive the role.

Prior to her debut appearance, Blackshaw said that Juliet will bring drama and that she will have a big presence on the soap. She explained that Juliet's mother, Donna-Marie Quinn (Lucy-Jo Hudson), "has always taught her to be the one on top, in order to survive". Juliet has little interest in school since she "doesn't see how it's going to help her get to where she wants to be in life". Therefore, rather than being studious, Juliet chooses to procrastinate and disrupt "in as many ways as she can think of" to entertain herself and her behaviour has effects on other students. Blackshaw admitted that "Juliet has a lot to learn, and she's going to make a lot of mistakes before she starts settling down". After Juliet's character is explored further, Blackshaw stated that she loves portraying her vulnerable side alongside her aggressive ways, and said that Juliet's aggressive behaviour is "just a façade".

When asked what her favourite thing about Juliet is, Blackshaw replied that it is Juliet's ability to say things that nobody else feels they can. She described her as "fierce" and "feisty" and noted that she is not afraid to call people out. She admitted that her character can sometimes go too far with people, but opined that Juliet using her attitude in the right way is a good thing. She felt that Juliet always means well, and despite doing bad things, she always does them with good intentions. Blackshaw has expressed her deep love for her character, owing her feelings to having played her for several years. She felt that due to wearing Juliet's costuming more than her own personal styling, it had led her to understand her character well.

== Development ==
=== Family issues and fixation on Darren Osborne ===
In January 2019, Juliet was revealed to be the daughter of Mac Nightingale (David Easter), linking her to the established Nightingale family. Juliet forms bonds with Marnie (Lysette Anthony) and James (Gregory Finnegan). However, when it is revealed that James framed Donna-Marie for Mac's murder and that everyone in the family knew but her, she loses her trust in them, especially Romeo. Blackshaw explained that his betrayal hurt her the most, saying: "He's been her rock and now she's been betrayed by him as well. It's like the final loss in her life, and it just drives her down a dark path, because she's got no-one left." Juliet makes plans to leave the village. Explaining her character's reasoning, Blackshaw stated: "Juliet is really angry, upset and very unforgiving. She's not happy at all! She doesn't like that she's been lied to by the people that she thought cared about her". Juliet also feels confusion regarding love interest Sid Sumner (Billy Price), and with the culmination of feelings, Juliet decides that she "just wants to get out, hoping it will solve a few problems."

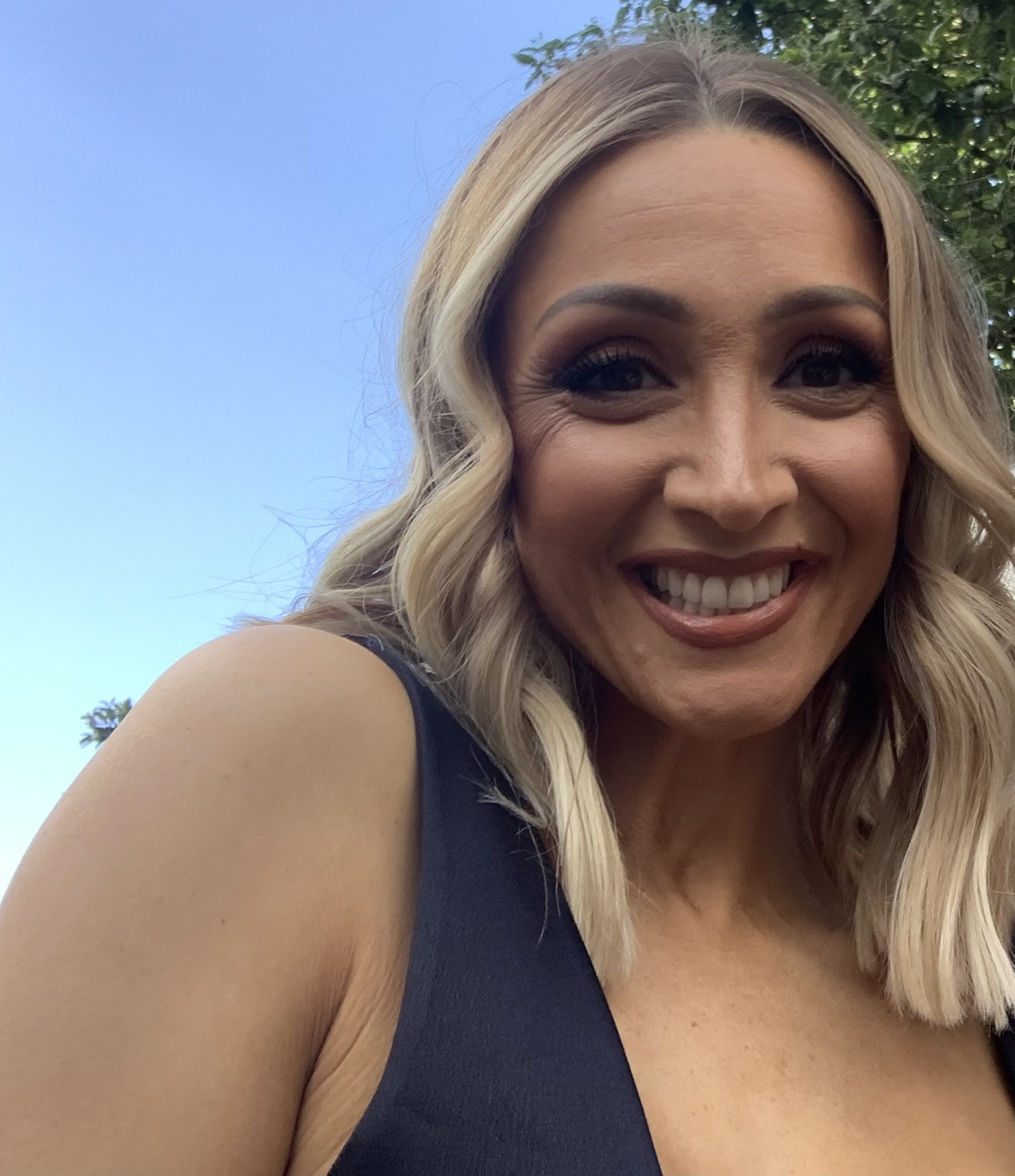
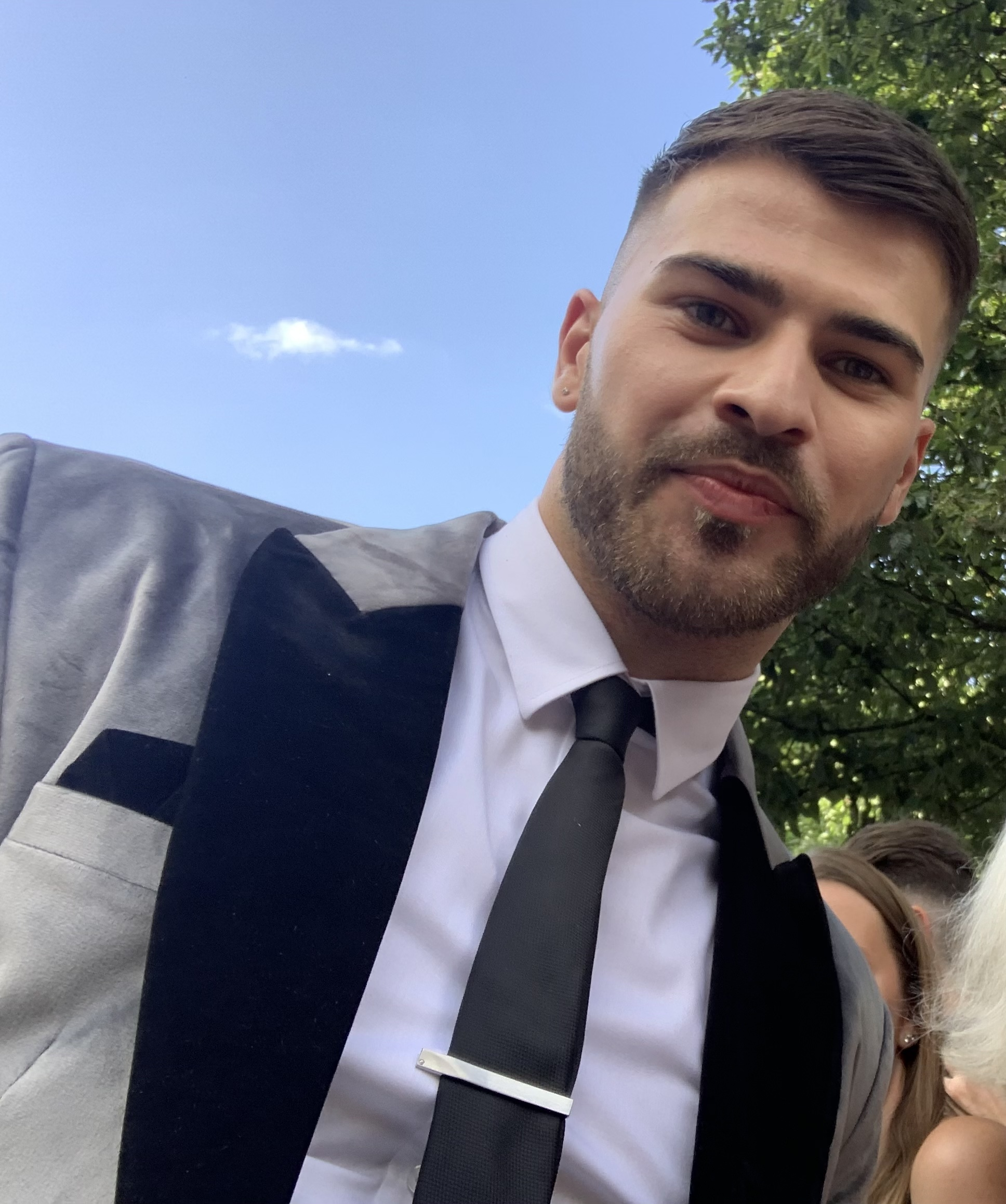
Lucy-Jo Hudson and Owen Warner portrayed Juliet's mother and half-brother, respectively.

After she decides to stay, Blackshaw stated that Juliet's relationship with her family would remain complicated. She said that Juliet loves Romeo "more than anything" but noted that their relationship changes as the pair get older, due to Juliet realising that Romeo is busy living his own life, which isolates Juliet and makes her feel lonely. Blackshaw also stated that despite Juliet loving Donna-Marie, she "finds it hard to cope with her when she puts her addictions above her children". Despite Donna-Marie constantly letting Juliet down, Blackshaw said that Juliet "never loses hope that one day her mum will stop taking drugs, get a job and look after her".

After the events of her troubled family life, Juliet is seen to form an "inappropriate fixation" on Darren. She forms a crush on him, believing that he feels the same way. Dawson, who portrays Darren, stated Darren "genuinely thinks he's helping" by becoming involved with Juliet, since the two bond over both having family issues. He also stated that Juliet had the potential to ruin Darren's life with accusations, since she is "a messed up little kid" with "all the power". Blackshaw agreed with his comments, adding that the reasoning behind Juliet's obsession with Darren is due to not having a primary caregiver whilst growing up. She explained that this meant that when Darren gives Juliet advice and cheers her up, she "latches" onto him. She also commented: "Darren is the first guy outside of her family that’s put himself out there and made himself available to her emotionally so she has latched on to that and taken it the wrong way completely. She genuinely thinks he likes her back, she really does. It just shows how naive she is and she genuinely has no doubt. His reaction is such a shock. I don't even think Mandy's on her mind."

=== Bullying Brooke Hathaway and friendship with Sid Sumner ===
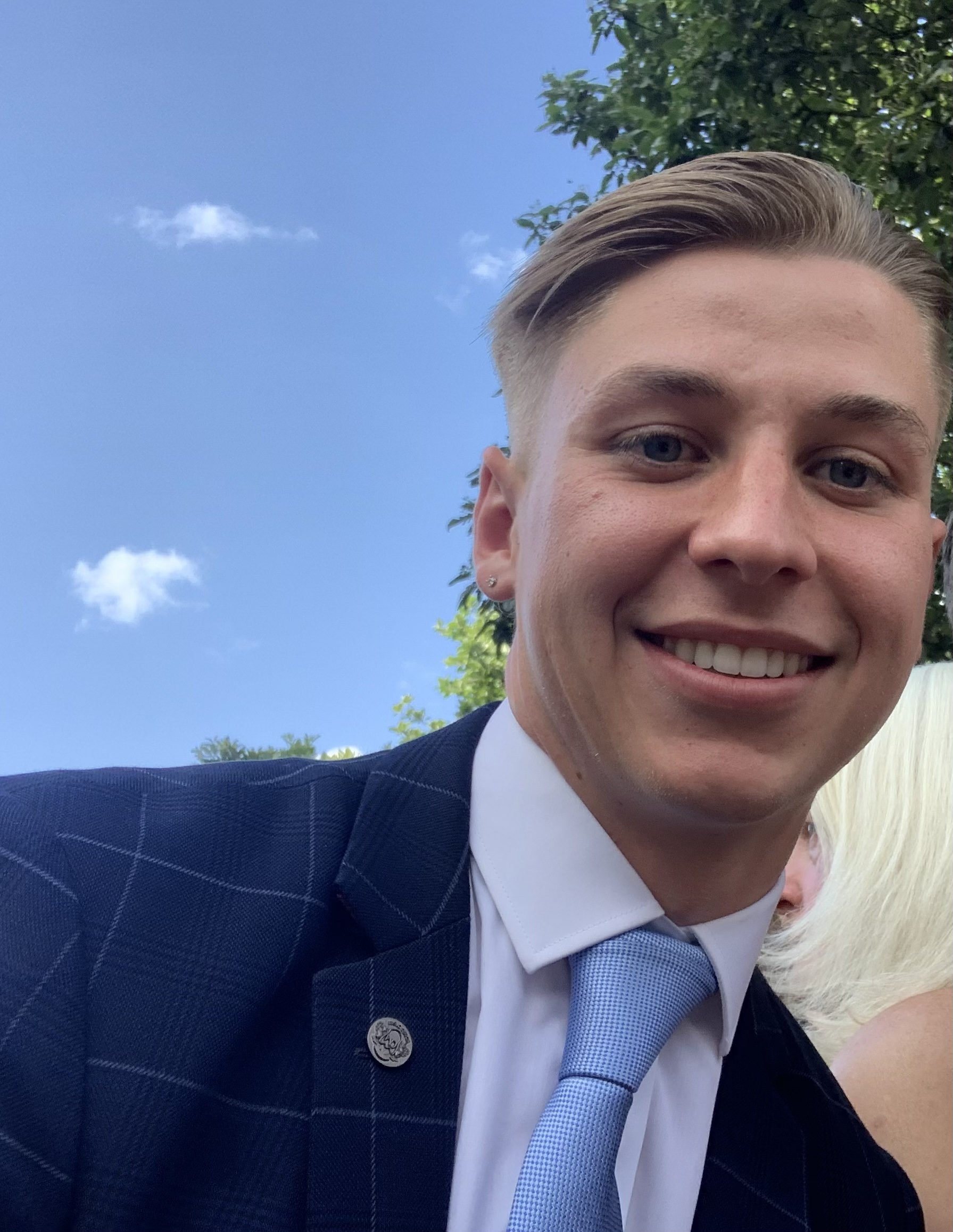
Sid Sumner (Billy Price) goes from Juliet's boyfriend to her platonic soulmate.

When Juliet joins Hollyoaks High, she is in the same year group as Imran, Oliver and Brooke. Blackshaw stated that upon their initial interactions with each other, they do not like each other due to Juliet's "attempt to prove that she's tough and not to be messed with", which leads to people disliking her. Juliet begins to target Brooke, who is autistic, in a bullying storyline. Brooke is an easy target for Juliet and Juliet uses any opportunity she has to put Brooke down. Blackshaw explained that Juliet's intention is not to hurt Brooke, but to make herself feel better due to her issues at home. The actress added that Juliet does like Brooke as a friend, but that she does not know how to treat Brooke due to not having had friends before her arrival in Hollyoaks. Imran and Oliver see the way that Juliet bullies Brooke and do not want to be associated with her until she redeems herself. Blackshaw stated that due to be being bullied herself, it was therapeutic to switch the narrative and play a bully. She also noted that it was important for Hollyoaks to show the vulnerability of autistic people and praised co-star Grant for their part in the storyline. Blackshaw promised that Juliet would learn from her mistakes, grow and "develop a sense of right and wrong", adding that viewers would sympathise with her character to an extent. The storyline climaxes when the teenagers go to a festival together. Juliet's intention is to drink alcohol and have fun in the crowd, but Brooke does not enjoy the festival as much as her. Juliet bullies Brooke into joining her fun and the scenes see Brooke collapse due to sensory overload. On the scenes, Blackshaw opined that her character is "used to being mean and spiteful to everyone" and is "messing up all the time and she keeps going back to the Juliet she was before, which means bullying the easiest target she can find."

Juliet's first romantic connection is with classmate Sid, with whom she begins a relationship with. However, when Juliet does not feel ready to have sex with him, he labels her frigid. This leads to Juliet questioning their relationship, as well as her sexuality in general, and the pair break up. Sid confesses that he still loves her and she confides in him about realising that she is a lesbian. Blackshaw noted that at that point, their dynamic changed from a romantic one to that of a friendship. She stated that Juliet and Sid have a really good friendship and are "soul mates rather than lovers", with no romance between them. Blackshaw added that their breakup was inevitable as "it's very rare that the first person you love is the person you end up with", and that rather than people continuing to ship them together, they should be happy because Juliet is finding a new love, even if it is not in the format they expected. When the pair became involved in a county lines drug trafficking storyline, Blackshaw stated that without Sid supporting her, Juliet would "crumble", adding: "it's only because the two of them work as a team that they're able to go to a local party, and they manage to do what is asked of them." When asked who cares for Juliet the most, she replied that Sid does. She explained that despite having other connections, Sid would "probably die for her". When Sid fakes his death in order to free Juliet from prison, Blackshaw explained that Juliet is devastated to hear of his death, labelling Sid her platonic soulmate. Since the last time Juliet saw Sid was when Jordan had been stabbed, Blackshaw said it made Juliet think "When was the last time I gave him a hug?". When he is revealed to be alive, Blackshaw commented that her character is more angry than relieved and would be thinking: "How flipping dare he! Why would he put me through that absolute trauma of that, and not tell me? Why was I not the number one person that knew?!" Blackshaw agreed with her character and said that Juliet should have been told that it was fake.

=== County lines drug-trafficking and imprisonment ===
In November 2019, it was announced that Juliet would be involved in a long-running county lines drug-trafficking storyline, alongside Sid and his cousin Jordan Price (Connor Calland). Blackshaw stated that the reason she thinks Jordan begins to target Juliet is due to being confident, witty, experienced and informed due to her childhood, while also being "very easy to manipulate". As the storyline intensifies, Juliet is forced to distance herself from the Nightingale family to focus on selling the drugs. Juliet "thinks she's in control, but she's not – she's very vulnerable and naïve". During the storyline, Juliet is arrested when she is found to have drugs in her possession. Blackshaw stated that her arrest is the turning point for Juliet, where she begins to "ask questions" and "make some decisions" about whether she wants to continue delivering drugs. Due to growing up around risks, Juliet is not worried about going to prison, as she "knows she will be able to get through it", but that the arrest does leave Juliet "feeling awful" and wanting to quit the drug delivering, unbeknownst to Juliet how deep into the operation she is.

When asked about her feelings on Juliet's style, Blackshaw joked that she often would look at Juliet's clothing in distaste, but explained that she is "finding herself". As part of the county lines storyline, Juliet was given a makeover. In the first two years of her tenure on Hollyoaks, Juliet was known to keep her light brown hair in a tight high side ponytail, which made Blackshaw feel like a young teen. In an episode broadcast on 31 December 2019, it showed Juliet a year in advance with dark brown loose hair, wearing street style clothing. On making the decision, Blackshaw did not mind dying her hair darker and was glad to get rid of the side ponytail. She was excited for herself and her character to have a change. She noted that the dark, loose hair would make Juliet look older and that people would treat her differently, as a reflection of the storyline. After the style change, Blackshaw described that Juliet's style as "really cool" and expressed her gratitude that she gets to wear tracksuits and jumpers. Despite liking the change, she noted that filming with loose hair is difficult when it is windy.

Drug lord Victor Brothers (Benjamin O'Mahony) orders Juliet to find new recruits for to sell drugs, and she blackmails Ella Richardson (Erin Palmer) into joining the organisation. As she becomes more desperate to leave the drug business, she plans to record Victor confessing to his crimes. However, the plan takes a "very dark turn" when Victor attacks Juliet after he discovers she is recording. He then informs Juliet that he will kill somebody that she loves. She decides to hand herself over to the police and is jailed. Blackshaw stated that once Juliet is in prison, "reality kicked in that she might not get out" this time. She explained that when Juliet handed herself in, she knew what was going to happen, but believed that they would be more lenient with her since she is young. She is freed over three months later, after evidence is gathered that she was groomed. Blackshaw labelled her character a victim and voiced her wishes for Juliet to have happiness. She explained that Juliet has "been through so much bad stuff" and deserves to have happiness. However, she noted that since it is a soap, it will be "a rocky road". She expressed her excitement at Juliet getting to "grow some more and have some adventures".

=== Sexuality and relationship with Peri Lomax ===
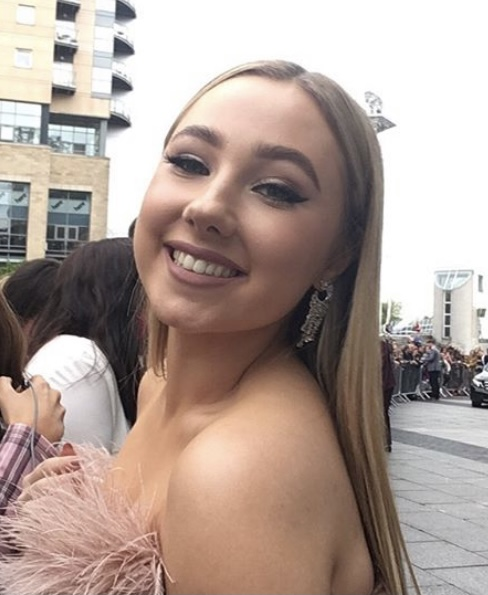
Ruby O'Donnell portrayed Juliet's love interest, Peri Lomax.

Another exploration of Juliet's character that was featured in the New Year's Eve "flashforward" was her sexuality, when scenes showed her confessing her love for Peri Lomax (Ruby O'Donnell) and kissing her. Duncan Lindsay of Metro confirmed that the scene would be explored further in a year-long arc that would show her switching from her feelings from Sid to Peri. Blackshaw stated that it was a surprise for both her and viewers, as prior to the scene airing, it had never been suggested that Juliet liked women romantically. She was told about the storyline "a few months" prior, and was glad that it was not "sprung" onto her so that she could prepare accordingly for the storyline. She added that she has numerous non-heterosexual friends and that it is "great to represent the LGBTQ+ community." Four months later, scenes were aired showing Juliet coming out to Sid as a lesbian.

In December 2019, it was confirmed that a relationship would develop between Juliet and Peri. Blackshaw stated that at the point of filming their first romantic scene together, she did not know the exact details of how the pair got together, but she knew that a relationship would eventually develop. She added that she loved working with O'Donnell, who portrays Peri, and that the pair enjoy filming together. O'Donnell echoed Blackshaw's comments, stating that she "loves" their storyline and that the pair had "both already seen loads of fan accounts for Peri and Juliet". After the pair were involved in a second kissing scene, Digital Spy confirmed that their relationship will continue to develop. The couple have since been referred to by the portmanteau 'Jeri'. Following Juliet's release from prison, Blackshaw stated that "it's the biggest relief in the world" for her character to be reunited with Peri. She joked that the pair "can't even walk casually" when they see each other and run to one another. She added: "it's been a long, long wait, and when it happens, it was just a million times better than what she imagined it would be". Blackshaw explained that having Peri waiting for her helped to "motivate her and push her through" and was a beneficial aspect for her character. She also voiced her excitement at Juliet starting her "first proper relationship" and hoped that their relationship would be long-running.

=== Being stalked and attacked by Timmy Simons ===
Following the release of Hollyoaks' spring 2021 trailer, a scene depicted newly introduced character Fergus Collins (Robert Beck) spying on Juliet and Peri with a camera planted in their bedroom. Digital Spy confirmed that he is a villain and wrote that the couple may be in danger. Scenes later explore Fergus' side business, an operation he names Bluebird, which involves the installation of cameras disguised as alarms in women's bedrooms in order to film them for Fergus' live-streaming website. People pay to watch the women being filmed without their permission and he employs Timmy Simons (Sam Tutty) to help him with the technological aspect of the business. Whilst working for Bluebird, Timmy forms an obsession with Peri and believes that Juliet is not worthy of being her girlfriend. He first comes in between the couple by sending an anonymous necklace to Peri, which irks Juliet and "causes a rift" between them.

Peri later receives an expensive hamper from Timmy, her anonymous stalker. When Juliet sees the hamper, she assumes the gift is for Marnie after she has tripped and been admitted to hospital. Peri goes along with her assumption but Juliet learns the hamper is another gift and the pair argue. After Timmy watches the pair make up after their argument via the cameras, he clones Peri's phone to further manipulate the couple, who are unaware that their "every move is being watched". After Juliet realises that Timmy may be stalking Peri, she confronts him and he reacts by pushing her down a flight of steps, with Juliet "left to die". After her recovery, Juliet finds Peri being held hostage by Timmy and saves her. The couple struggle to process that they have been watched and manipulated by Timmy, but are later left "destroyed" when they learn that their lives were also streamed online for people to watch. Blackshaw was pleased that Hollyoaks had addressed the issues of toxic masculinity and the discomfort of women with the storyline. She explained that although Timmy was an extreme example of the issue, it was still highlighting "the pressure or being coerced of doing something or being in a situation you aren't comfortable with".

=== Engagement to Peri and near-death experience ===
In December 2021, Susannah Alexander of Digital Spy wrote that Hollyoaks were to hint at a wedding for Juliet and Peri in the new year. After Peri makes a joke about the couple's wedding, Juliet begins to think about the pair getting married. She asks Peri's friend, Yasmine Maalik (Haiesha Mistry), about her marriage and how she knew it was right to get married. It was later confirmed that Juliet would propose as part of Out Of Time, a Hollyoaks stunt week in January 2022. Metro wrote that Juliet plans to propose to Peri during a fundraiser held by Marnie. They wrote that Peri would initially be unsure of marrying Juliet but that she would "realise just what it is that she wants while in a life-threatening situation" but that it may be "too late to make her dream a reality", hinting Juliet may die in the stunt week. Unable to afford a ring, Marnie gives her a family heirloom ring. However, as Juliet speaks with Peri, the building explodes. Juliet is left dangling over a staircase held by Peri, who is unable to hold the weight and has to let go. Juliet falls into the smoke and is admitted to the emergency department. Peri stays beside her bed and takes the ring given to her by Marnie; she proposes to an unconscious Juliet and after Juliet wakes up from her surgery, she accepts.

On the engagement, O'Donnell said that Peri's initial doubts come from the pair only having been together for a year at the point of the plot. She revealed that both herself and Blackshaw were shocked at the engagement and thought it could be too soon, but explained that when they come close to death, it makes them realise what is important. O'Donnell added that if Juliet were to die in the explosion, she would be devastated due to being best friends with Blackshaw in real life and loving their characters' onscreen relationship. On the possibility of her own exit, Blackshaw stated that she would be gutted to leave the soap but said that her character leaving through the stunt would be "a great way to go". Blackshaw had never done a stunt prior to the episodes and was excited for the experience. She told the production team that she wanted to perform as much of her own stunts as possible, so while she had a stunt double, Blackshaw filmed various scenes hanging from a harness and enjoyed the experience. She also confirmed that there would be a death in the Nightingale family, later revealed to be Marnie.

=== Affair with Nadira Valli and cancer diagnosis ===
When Juliet and Peri begin experiencing problems within their relationship, they start seeking advice from matchmaker Nadira Valli (Ashling O'Shea). Juliet becomes close to Nadira, meeting her in private in what she intends on being a friendship until attraction forms between them. O'Shea said in an interview with Inside Soap that Nadira would never have addressed their chemistry due to being closeted, but Juliet does address it, and the pair share a kiss. O'Shea confirmed that the kiss would lead to a long-term affair which Nadira would feel bad about due to liking Peri. Peri eventually discovers the affair and the pair split. Juliet becomes keen to go public with her and Nadira's relationship, who pleads her to keep it a secret. However, when Nadira is set to marry Shaq Qureshi (Omar Malik), Juliet exposes their relationship at the altar.

Months into her relationship with Nadira, Juliet kisses Peri. Blackshaw was not surprised that Juliet had returned to Peri and felt it necessary. She had sensed that their relationship would be revisited at point and felt they "a lot of unfinished business there". After Hollyoaks' winter 2022 trailer premiered, viewers began speculating that Juliet had cancer. She begins to feel tired, dizzy and suffers from numerous headaches, so she is seen at the hospital. Misbah Maalik (Harvey Virdi) has tests done on Juliet and she is then diagnosed with lymphoma, a type of blood cancer, which she undergoes chemotherapy for. In a Metro interview, Blackshaw said that the storyline was huge for her. She felt grateful to be given "a heavy, emotional topic" that affects so many people. Despite her gratuity towards the team, she was worried that she would not be capable of handling such a dark and issue-led storyline. She was also worried for the fate of her character as a result of the cancer. Although she had initial worries about the story, Blackshaw became proud of her work, which she described as her best on the soap. She was also happy to work with a new set of cast members for the story.

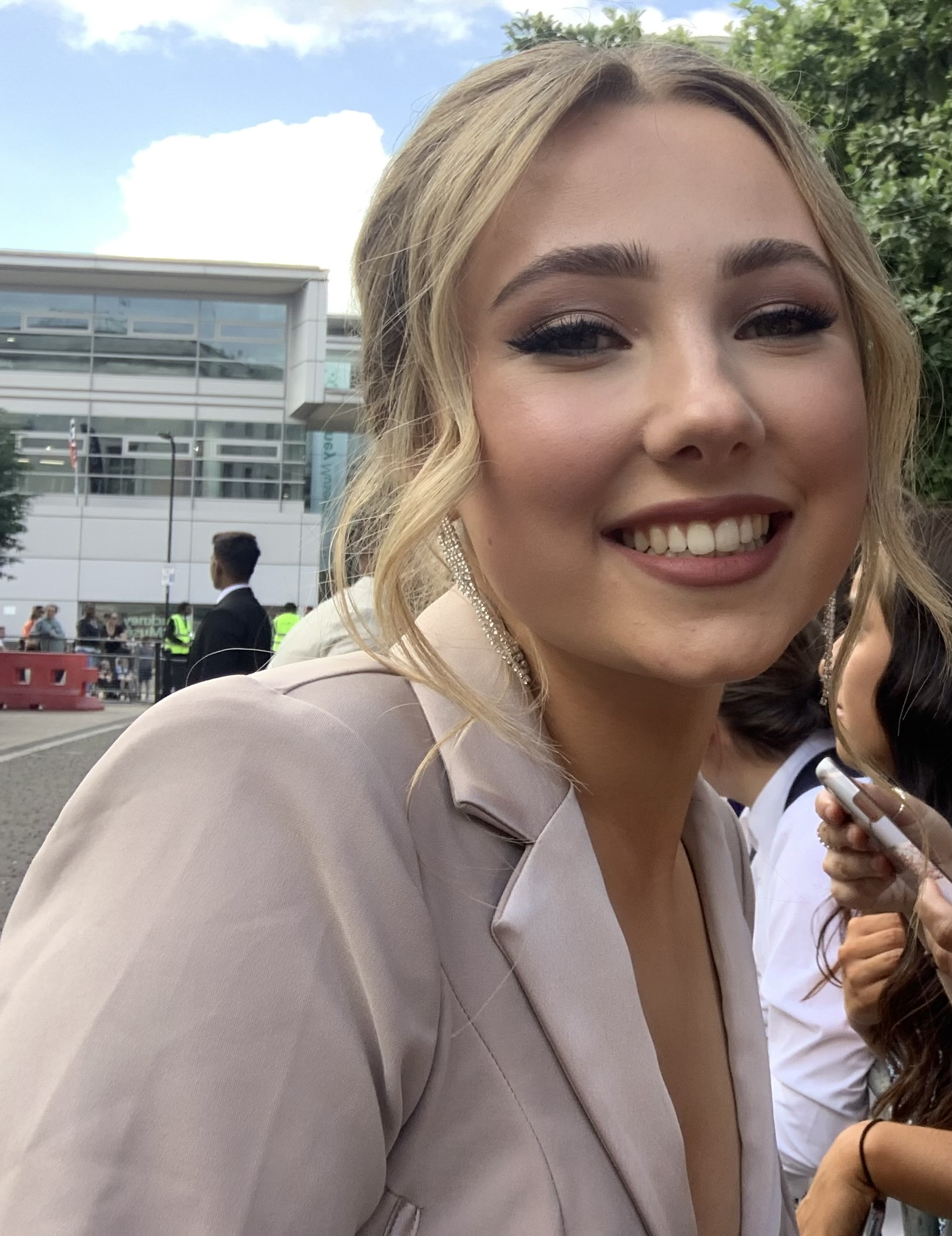
Juliet's cancer storyline sees her reunite with Peri.

Juliet initially only informs immediate family of her cancer and attempts to brush Peri and Nadira off. On Peri's reaction to the situation, O'Donnell explained that her character will always make it her mission to find out what Juliet is up to due to Peri's deep love for Juliet. Peri teams up with Nadira to find out what Juliet is hiding, which leads to an argument between them, in which Juliet blurts out her diagnosis to stop them. The reveal sees Nadira be supportive of Juliet, while Peri initially "struggles to get her head around it all". O'Donnell said: "she acts in a way I think she shouldn't have, but that's what happens when you're in shock and you get this horrible news. But she pulls herself together and realises she's got to be there for her." She warned fans that the rest of the storyline would be very emotional and "filled with love and also filled with sadness" in scenes that see Peri support Juliet both personally and also in her nursing job.

=== Terminal diagnosis and death ===
Peri's support for Juliet eventually sees the pair reconcile their relationship. The pair were given a "special episode" by producers which saw on-location filming in Brighton with guest star Danny Beard. The trip is planned by Peri after she learns that as a child, Juliet always wanted to visit Brighton, but was let down by her mother. After returning, Juliet learns that her chemotherapy has been successful, but due to the aggressive nature of the cancer, she is told that she also needs a stem cell transplant.

Whilst she is undergoing chemotherapy, Peri accidentally infects Juliet with norovirus due to her work as a nurse. She feels guilty for compromising Juliet's health and quits her job in an emotional outburst at the hospital. Since it leaves Juliet even more ill, she is taken into hospital. She stays positive and has an "inner fight", as described by Blackshaw, who said that her character will not lose hope since she does not want to lose everything. After Juliet's experience with norovirus affects her kidney and her cancer spreads, she is told that she can no longer have a stem cell transplant or receive further chemotherapy, meaning that her cancer had become terminal. Metro confirmed that the climax of the storyline would see Juliet die after Blackshaw had quit her role after five years as a mainstay on the series. Her final scenes aired on 9 June 2023, with Juliet dying beside Peri.

== Reception ==
Upon the announcement of her casting, Johnathon Hughes of the Radio Times thought that the character's name was unsurprising due to her brother being called Romeo. Blackshaw stated that upon her arrival in the soap, Juliet was "not particularly liked" due to her brash characterisation. Over time, viewer opinion began to change, which Blackshaw owed to scenes showing her family life and nice moments with Marnie. She admitted that Juliet deserved some bad feedback after the bullying storyline, adding: "if you do something bad, you deserve some repercussions". Some viewers would question Blackshaw on why Juliet is bullying Brooke, but said that it was nice that other viewers could see it was due to Juliet being bullied herself. For her portrayal of Juliet, Blackshaw was nominated for two awards at the 2019 Inside Soap Awards; Best Newcomer and Best Partnership alongside Anthony, who portrayed her grandmother Marnie. Blackshaw "couldn't be happier with the fan reactions" to Juliet and Peri's relationship. She said that she enjoys seeing fan accounts for the characters, as well as the memes and comments they make online. While some viewers were not as keen with the pairing, most fans of the show were rooting for them to be together, which she liked. The pair were later nominated for Best Soap Partnership at the 2021 I Talk Telly Awards, as well as garnering another nomination in the category at the 2022 Digital Spy Reader Awards. In 2023, after her performance in Juliet's cancer storyline, Blackshaw was nominated for the British Soap Award for Best Leading Performer.
