= Phoenix Hathaway =

Fictional character from Hollyoaks

- Hollyoaks character
- Portrayed by: Tylan Grant
- Duration: 2018–2024
- First appearance: Episode 4947; 10 July 2018
- Last appearance: Episode 6300; 31 January 2024
- Introduced by: Bryan Kirkwood
In-universe information
- Other names: Brooke Hathaway
- Occupation: Salesperson
- Mother: Fran Hathaway
- Adoptive father: Darren Osborne
- Adoptive mother: Nancy Hayton
- Brothers: Oscar Osborne (adoptive); Charlie Dean (adoptive)
- Sisters: Morgan Osborne (adoptive)
- Half-brothers: JJ Osborne (adoptive)
- Half-sisters: Frankie Osborne (adoptive)
- Sons: Thierry
- Grandfathers: Jack Osborne (adoptive)

Phoenix Hathaway (also Brooke Hathaway) is a fictional character from the Channel 4 soap opera Hollyoaks, played by Tylan Grant. Grant made his first appearance as the character in episode 4947, originally broadcast on 10 July 2018. Phoenix is initially introduced as Brooke, an autistic teenage girl who is fostered by the Osborne family. He was the first autistic regular character in a soap opera and Grant marked the first BAME actor to portray an autistic character in a television series. Phoenix's storylines in the soap have included being adopted by the Osbornes following the death of his mother, his relationships with Imran Maalik (Ijaz Rana) and Oliver Morgan (Aedan Duckworth/Gabriel Clark), being bullied by Juliet Nightingale (Niamh Blackshaw), becoming pregnant and putting his son up for adoption and coming to the realisation that he is non-binary, but later transitioning to a trans man and changing his name to Phoenix. Grant quit his role as Phoenix and made his final appearance on 31 January 2024, when Phoenix and Shing Lin Leong (Izzie Yip) move to London.

Grant has expressed gratitude for being able to portray the character due to the explorations of Brooke's autism, non-binary identity and later transition to a man. As Grant is autistic and trans, he was glad to convey these qualities through the character, hoping he could act as representation for those respective groups of people. For his portrayal of the character, Grant has been nominated for Best Soap Newcomer at the 2018 Digital Spy Reader Awards, the 2019 British Soap Award for Best Newcomer and Celebrity of the Year at the 2019 National Diversity Awards. Phoenix's coming out scene was also nominated for Feel-Good Moment at the Inside Soap Awards.

== Casting and characterisation ==
The character and Grant's casting details were announced on 23 April 2018. Introduced as Brooke, he was billed as a "strong, independent character" who knows what it is like to be a teenager with autism. It was confirmed that he has high-functioning autism and executive producer Bryan Kirkwood said that Phoenix understands how his condition can affect his life, stating that Phoenix experiences the world "a hundred times more intensely" than neurotypical people. He explained that having ice cream with someone can become a cherished experience for Brooke and that a nasty remark from a schoolteacher could "cut Brooke to the core". Kirkwood added: "every light shines brighter, every smell is stronger – and every word [he] takes to heart that little bit more." While appearing on Loose Women, Grant told the panel that he is different to Brooke in real life, as he has a different form of autism to his character. Grant added how exciting it was to represent autism on a mainstream media platform. Hollyoaks placed an open casting call for somebody to portray the character and worked with charity the National Autistic Society and theatre company Access All Areas during the creation and casting processes, as well as working with Grant directly when developing the character. Grant stated that he enjoy appearing in Hollyoaks and when Brooke was a female character, he was proud to represent autistic women in television, something which he felt was not portrayed enough, and noted that autistic women of colour are particularly unrepresented in media. Kirkwood was pleased with Grant's casting, labelling him as a "brilliant new talent", and describing his auditions as "joyful".

== Development ==
=== Representing autism and having parents on set ===
Kirkwood stated that the character would be introduced with a secret. Further details about his introduction were released on 1 July 2018, and it was revealed that Phoenix is the child of Fran Hathaway, who murdered Becca Dean (Ali Bastian) in 2007. Digital Spy stated that for Nancy, Phoenix would serve as a "permanent reminder" of Fran murdering her sister and hinted that there would be "tough times" ahead. They also hinted that while Nancy taking in Phoenix could be a step too far, it could simultaneously "add some light to one of the darkest times of her life". Speaking about his own autism, Grant stated that he "knows that [he is] not like everyone else", and that like him, Phoenix has faced those difficulties and challenges of feeling different. Grant continued: "I think that [Phoenix] has really embraced it and I know that I have embraced my difference, like, over the years and so I know that I can use that to do amazing things, like I'm doing now bringing awareness." Grant stated that when he joined the cast of Hollyoaks, the production team had autism training, so that when there is a loud noise, Grant can go into another room. He stated that while it is simple, it is helpful for him. The actor also applauded the programme for embracing his character, commenting: "I think it's really good that Hollyoaks has been able to represent an autistic person, because it is bringing so much awareness and I've had people reach out to me. I would have loved to have someone growing up that had autism that was open about it that was an actor that I could resonate with." Grant added that it was important for an autistic actor like himself to portray Phoenix due to the deeper understanding that someone with autism would have.

In January 2020, Grant's parents appeared in Hollyoaks as the adoptive parents of Phoenix's son. Grant's father David described the experience as a "role reversal", noting Grant's experience on a set is much larger than his. Grant's mother Carrie echoed his comments, adding that it was a special experience and that having Tylan alongside them "made it like it was more home-life than work!" The parents also said how it was difficult to differentiate between Grant in real life and Phoenix as a character. David stated that he "had to get [himself] into a headspace" where he was not watching his real child, but was watching a character, with Carrie confessing that she did not do a great job of differentiating the character from her child.

In an interview on the Hollyoaks YouTube channel at the end of 2020, Grant talked about Phoenix's attitude to life. He explained that due to trying to find his own identity while also trying to battle the external world, his goals become "getting by", trying to "find a light at the end of the tunnel" and trying to find the positives in life. Phoenix prefers to attempt understanding himself rather than attempting to understand the world. Grant opined that life is throwing its problems at Phoenix, referring to his pregnancy and breakup with Oliver. He stated that it had taken a toll on Phoenix's emotions, but that ultimately, the decision to leave Oliver was right due to the situation being "destructive" for the character. Grant noted that although the decision was right for Phoenix, he was upset about the breakup due to enjoying filming with Gabriel Clark. When asked what advice he would give Phoenix, Grant replied that he would tell him that "this is just a chapter of your life, and it can feel like more, but the only thing that is certain is that nothing is certain. So just keep going."

=== Gender identities and name change ===
After Phoenix comes out as non-binary, Grant said that the storyline meant a lot to him due to being non-binary in real life at the time. Grant found the progression of Phoenix's self growth and self discovery emotional and empowering. He hoped that the non-binary character could act as representation for people confused about their identities, as well as people coming to terms with who they are. Grant also felt that the character was the representation he wish that he had when he were younger.

When Grant transitioned to a trans man in real life, it was confirmed that his character would take "centre stage in a heartwarming scene" in September 2023. The scenes see him inform Charlie that he now identifies as a man and wants to be known as Phoenix. The character was giving new costuming for the transition, alongside a new promotional photoshoot for the character's new look. Grant was happy that the change had been made to his character, as he felt like it was a natural progression for Phoenix. Grant talked with the producers about how they wanted to approach the coming out scene, as well as asking if Grant was comfortable doing a name change storyline. He appreciated being asked and loved how the scriptwriters had written the scene between Phoenix. Grant also revealed that Hollyoaks had originally chosen for his name to be River, but due to the introduction of Rayne Royce (Jemma Donovan), they felt it was too similar and chose Phoenix instead.

Phoenix's name change is understated on screen as opposed to being a big storyline, which Grant appreciated due to being in a "climate that is very scary to live in for a lot of trans people". He opined that Hollyoaks were looking out for him. Despite Phoenix's name and pronoun changes, as well as new costuming, Grant confirmed that the personality of the character would not change, which he appreciated. He was asked about what else was coming up for Phoenix, to which he confirmed that the character would be interacting with Rayne and the other young characters more.

== Storylines ==
The child of Fran, who murdered Becca Dean (Ali Bastian), Phoenix first appears as teenage girl Brooke when spying on Becca's sister, Nancy Osborne (Jessica Fox), who Fran has been in contact with. He then signs up for Nancy's tutoring classes and during a session, he reveals to Nancy that he is Fran's child and that Fran is dying. Phoenix and Nancy visit Fran in hospital and Fran begs for Nancy's forgiveness. Fran dies, leaving Phoenix alone. Not wanting him to be sent into the foster care system, Nancy convinces Jack (Jimmy McKenna) and Darren (Ashley Taylor Dawson) that they should foster Phoenix. Although initially wary of him, Darren eventually agrees and helps to convince the social worker to let Phoenix stay with them. Phoenix develops a connection with Oliver Morgan (Aedan Duckworth) and the two go on a coffee date together. However, after seeing Oliver in the changing rooms at the football academy with his football coach Buster Smith (Nathan Sussex), Phoenix sees Buster putting his hand on Oliver's knee. The next morning, Phoenix outs him as gay to his stepmother, Mandy Morgan (Sarah Jayne Dunn). Unknown to Phoenix, Oliver is being groomed by Buster and in retaliation, Oliver shouts at Phoenix by calling him an idiot and denying the accusations, causing Phoenix to have a breakdown. Phoenix also forms a connection with Imran Maalik (Ijaz Rana), but ends their relationship after finding out that he has been abusing his mother Misbah (Harvey Virdi) and sister Yasmine (Haiesha Mistry). Afterwards, Phoenix begins dating Oliver.

Juliet Nightingale (Niamh Blackshaw) joins Hollyoaks High and begins bullying Phoenix. Juliet takes every opportunity to belittle and embarrass Phoenix, including making him miss an important exam, causing him to collapse from sensory overload and trying to sabotage Phoenix's relationship with Oliver. Phoenix becomes pregnant but does not feel ready to become a parent, despite Ollie being ready. Phoenix arranges to have the baby adopted and later gives birth to a son, Thierry. Thierry is adopted by Mal (David Grant) and Zoe (Carrie Grant). When Phoenix and Oliver are set to attend a party, Phoenix worries due to having forgotten his noise cancelling earbuds and states that he want to go home. Oliver lashes out at him, claiming that his relationship revolves around what Phoenix wants and that they never do anything in favour of him. In response, Phoenix ends their relationship. Oliver then leaves the village without saying anything to Phoenix.

Upon Oliver's (now played by Gabriel Clark) return to the village, he apologises and the two reconcile his relationship. However, after Phoenix learns that Oliver is addicted to drugs and has had sex with Juliet while on a drug high, Phoenix ends their relationship again. In a bid to move on from Oliver, Phoenix forms a band with Imran and Sid Sumner (Billy Price). Phoenix forms a friendship with clothing stall owner Ripley Lennox (Ki Griffin), who recommends a piece of men's clothing to Phoenix. Phoenix likes the clothing but does not want to wear men's clothing; however, Ripley gifts Phoenix the clothes and leaves a note saying that clothing is genderless. Phoenix later overhears Ripley speaking about how they are non-binary, and in response to Phoenix's confusion about his identity, Ripley explains. Phoenix relates to aspects of being non-binary and begins to wear men's clothing to test his boundaries. After Phoenix is uncomfortable to be voted prom queen, he come to the realisation that he is non-binary. Phoenix then comes out to a supportive Juliet and Imran and begins using they/them pronouns. Phoenix later tells Charlie Dean (Charlie Behan) that he is a trans man and wants to change his pronouns to he/him, as well as changing his name from Brooke to Phoenix.

== Reception ==
For his portrayal of the character, Grant was nominated for Best Soap Newcomer at the 2018 Digital Spy Reader Awards; he came in eighth place with 3.9% of the total votes. In 2019, he received a nomination for Best Newcomer at the British Soap Awards, as well as a nomination for Best Young Actor at the Inside Soap Awards. Grant was also shortlisted for Celebrity of the Year at the National Diversity Awards, who stated that he "made history" for being the first BAME actor to portray an autistic character in a mainstream drama series. In 2021, Phoenix's first coming out scene was nominated for Feel-Good Moment at the Inside Soap Awards.

In a piece on the character, Jay Tee Rattray, an autistic person who advocates for disabled representation in media, praised Phoenix. She stated that she was "delighted" to learn of the introduction of an autistic character and especially praised the usage of an autistic actor such as Grant to portray him. Rattray praised his first scenes on Hollyoaks, noting the scenes where sounds that Phoenix could hear were amplified for viewers to understand the character's point of view. She went on to say that when watching him, there was "something different" about the way Phoenix's characterisation was shown. Rattray explained that "there was no weird voice, no blank expression, it was completely natural", and that unlike other television series, there were obvious signs that Phoenix is autistic without it being stereotypical. Rattray also complimented Grant's portrayal of the character, stating that he brings "real heart to everything [Phoenix] does" and commended Grant's "incredibly expressive face which makes [Phoenix] incredibly watchable". Rattray felt that other forms of media tend to portray autistic characters as emotionless and appreciated that he is different. Rattray also applauded the way Hollyoaks handle Phoenix's direct nature, writing that it would be easy to make it a source of comedy or drama, but they do not. Rattray admired that they put Brooke within the Osborne family, due to Nancy having multiple sclerosis and Oscar Osborne (Noah Holdworth) being deaf, but noted that the family is never centred on their disabilities, but it is made part of their regular life. Rattray's only criticism was that in Phoenix's first few months on the series, he had only been seen develop romantic relationships rather than friendships. In 2026, Chantelle Billson from PinkNews wrote that Phoenix and Ripley "provided vital non-binary and trans representation" in Hollyoaks.

== See also ==
- Autism spectrum disorders in the media
- List of autistic fictional characters
- List of fictional trans characters
- List of LGBT characters in soap operas
