= List of Hollyoaks characters introduced in 2020 =

Hollyoaks is a British television soap opera that was first broadcast on 23 October 1995. The following is a list of characters introduced in 2020, by order of first appearance. All characters were introduced by executive producer, Bryan Kirkwood. January saw the introduction of Tony Hutchinson's (Nick Pickard) sister Verity (Eva O'Hara) and PC George Kiss (Callum Kerr). March saw the arrival of Mitchell Deveraux (Imran Adams), Toby Faroe (Bobby Gordon) and Celeste Faroe's (Andrea Ali) father, Felix Westwood (Richard Blackwood). Kyle Kelly's (Adam Rickitt) parents, Mark (Christopher Quinten) and Carole (Diana Weston) first appeared in May, while Sylver McQueen's (David Tag) secret daughter, Cher Winters (Bethannie Hare) and Jordan Price's (Connor Calland) drugs boss, Victor Brothers (Benjamin O'Mahoney) made their debuts in June. July saw the arrival of Cormac Ranger (James Gaddas) and Ripley Lennox (Ki Griffin). Summer Ranger (Rhiannon Clements) then made her first appearance in November. Additionally, multiple other characters appear throughout the year.

== Verity Hutchinson ==
Verity Hutchinson
- Hollyoaks character
- Portrayed by: Eva O'Hara
- Duration: 2020–2022
- First appearance: Episode 5335; 7 January 2020
- Last appearance: Episode 6000; 9 December 2022
- Introduced by: Bryan Kirkwood
- Spin-off appearances: Hollyoaks Later (2020)
In-universe information
- Father: Edward Hutchinson
- Mother: Charlotte Hutchinson
- Brothers: Eric Foster
- Half-brothers: Tony Hutchinson; Dominic Reilly
- Half-sisters: Eva Hutchinson
- Nephews: Beau Ramsey; Harry Thompson; Anthony Hutchinson; Ro Hutchinson
- Nieces: Grace Hutchinson; Morgan Osborne; Dee Dee Hutchinson (adoptive); Eva Hutchinson (adoptive)
- Other relatives: Isaac Thompson

Verity Hutchinson, played by Eva O'Hara, made her first appearance on 6 January 2020, as part of Hollyoaks Later and her last appearance on 7 December 2022 when she dies following a cardiac arrest after having a bookshelf pushed on top of her by Bobby Costello. The character was announced on 20 September 2019, but casting wasn't revealed until 10 December 2019. Verity is the sister of the soap's longest-running character Tony Hutchinson (Nick Pickard) and the daughter of Edward Hutchinson (Joe McGann). Verity is Edward's favourite child and arrives in the village to launch her own law firm. Describing the character, Eva said that she "can hold her own in any situation and really doesn't take no for an answer", adding: "She has a fascinating balance of ruthlessness and compassion, making her one to watch... I've found myself feeling jealous of her fearlessness at times."

Speaking about her casting, she said: "I have been totally bowled over by the wonderful team at Hollyoaks. I have fallen in love with the warmth and passion of everyone involved, and feel utterly blessed to be involved in such a creative environment."

== George Kiss ==
George Kiss
- Hollyoaks character
- Portrayed by: Callum Kerr
- Duration: 2020–2021
- First appearance: Episode 5354; 30 January 2020
- Last appearance: Episode 5594; 20 May 2021
- Introduced by: Bryan Kirkwood
In-universe information
- Occupation: Police officer

George Kiss, played by Callum Kerr, made his first appearance on 30 January 2020. The character and casting was announced on 20 January 2020. George is involved in a county lines drug trafficking storyline, and made his first appearance after Nancy Osborne (Jessica Fox) is stabbed at Hollyoaks High.

Speaking about being part of the show, Kerr said: "I feel very honoured to be joining the cast of Hollyoaks during such a thrilling time for the show. My first couple of months have been brilliant and the cast and crew are very friendly and welcoming. My grandfather was a policeman like my character, so he'll be delighted to see me in the uniform. I'll be part of the team investigating the County Lines storyline, which will hopefully help raise awareness of a relevant topic and shed light on a serious issue." Speaking further about the character's personality, Kerr said: "He'd be willing to risk his life, as long as the papers wrote about him afterwards and called him a 'hero cop'! I think he'd do anything. George is going to put himself in some dangerous situations when he should probably wait for back-up. But I think he loves the action and he is so passionate that he rushes in without thinking. George is very exciting as a new character. He's passionate and he loves his job. He loves being the saviour and being in the limelight. George loves the action of being a policeman, more so than the paperwork and the logistics. You'll see that he's quite flirty, he's very friendly with everyone and he has got a really exciting storyline."

He continued, saying: "My first scenes come when Nancy has just been stabbed in the playground after an altercation and the police are called. George is the first officer on the scene, but the paramedics are already there. He has to try to understand what's going on very quickly. George takes control of the situation immediately. It's a really nice way to be introduced, showing him as someone who's trustworthy and who can take control of a dangerous situation. I think there'll be a lot of those, over the course of the next year. So far my scenes have been with the teachers at the school. I have shared scenes with Nancy, Sally, John Paul, and then a few of the worried parents as well. I've also been with DS Cohen a few times. She's my boss and she's very good at her job, so George is keen to impress! You'll see that George is a police officer for the right reasons and his heart is in it. He wants to make sure this village, and the kids in it, are safe from the dangers that come from drug dealing and drug trafficking.""

Following his first appearance, George quickly became a love interest for John Paul McQueen (James Sutton). Much of their relationship took place off-screen, as the impact of the COVID-19 pandemic on television meant that four months of filming was lost, and Kerr said that their "relationship blossoming and the good parts of their relationship" were not seen. He felt that it was a shame that viewers were not able to see the scenes, but said that the writers did a good job with what they could do. The relationship becomes abusive, with George having coercive control over John Paul. His "sick manipulation" includes using his ex-boyfriend Dean Vickers (Paul Sloss), who he also abused, to make John Paul jealous, hitting John Paul, and isolating him from his family and friends. In a surprise scene broadcast on 22 April 2021, George is murdered. Digital Spy had to confirm that George had really died, as earlier that week, the character faked his own death as part of his abusive relationship with John Paul. Kerr was grateful to be on the show, stating that while he would have liked to appear for longer, he was happy that his tenure was not shorter. He also felt that his tenure was long enough to do the abuse storyline justice, noting that some viewers were calling for the storyline to end. Kerr spoke with the producers about the fate of his character and they agreed that his death was a "justifiable end" for his character. Both Kerr and the producers opined that George returning in the future "to cause more havoc" would not be a good arc for the soap, since they felt his abuse was "disgusting". They also wanted John Paul to be able to move on from the trauma of the relationship properly. The suspects for George's murder include John Paul, Nancy, Dean, Mercedes McQueen (Jennifer Metcalfe), Theresa McQueen (Jorgie Porter), Cher Winters (Bethannie Hare), Sally St. Claire (Annie Wallace), James Nightingale (Gregory Finnegan), and Ste Hay (Kieron Richardson). Kerr confirmed that he knew the murderer and stated that it will not be revealed "for a while". It is later revealed through a series of flashback scenes that Sally is responsible for his death when she finds him about to attack Theresa.

== Thierry ==
Thierry
- Hollyoaks character
- Portrayed by: Uncredited (2020); Orlando Bannister (2022)
- Duration: 2020, 2022
- First appearance: Episode 5369; 20 February 2020
- Last appearance: Episode 5858; 25 May 2022
- Introduced by: Bryan Kirkwood
In-universe information
- Parents: Oliver Morgan; Phoenix Hathaway
- Adoptive father: Mal
- Adoptive mother: Zoe
- Grandfathers: Luke Morgan; Darren Osborne (adoptive)
- Grandmothers: Scarlett Morgan; Nancy Osborne (adoptive)
- Uncles: DJ Osborne; Charlie Dean (adoptive); JJ Osborne (adoptive); Oscar Osborne (adoptive)
- Aunts: Frankie Osborne; Morgan Osborne
- Other relatives: Zara Morgan; Jack Osborne (adoptive)

Thierry is the biological son of Phoenix Hathaway (Tylan Grant) and Ollie Morgan (Aedan Duckworth). He was born on 20 February 2020 in Episode 5369, and was adopted by Mal (David Grant) and Zoe (Carrie Grant), who are actually Grant's real-life parents. Speaking to Radio Times, Grant said: “Once she had given the baby away, I think Brooke felt like it was the end of a chapter for her. She was very decided about adoption. It was a really weird feeling filming with my mum and dad. It was like a crack in the simulation!" He continued by explaining how it may impact Phoenix's relationship with Ollie: "I really don’t know what the future holds for Brooke and Ollie, and whether they can move past this. They certainly love each other however they aren’t really feeling the same things. I think it is really important that Hollyoaks is tackling the topic of adoption as we need far more people to come forward to adopt children, especially black and mixed-race children." Ollie made a memory book for their baby boy but he was too upset to reveal either to Phoenix or Mal and Zoe that his son had a 50 percent chance of inheriting the genetic condition Frontotemporal Dementia (FTD) from his dad, Luke Morgan (Gary Lucy).

On 25 May 2022, Thierry returns with Mal and Zoe after Ollie reaches out to them after his father, who has dementia, accused him of abandoning him. Gabriel Clark, who had taken over the role of Ollie from Duckworth, told Inside Soap: "It's so exciting to revisit this adoption story: it's a lovely opportunity to see how much Ollie has changed." He continued: "Over the past few years, Ollie has had a few moments where he's questioned whether he made the right decision giving up Thierry. It's not how Ollie expects it to be – as with any reunion in Hollyoaks, there are twists and turns, and bumps along the way. A lot happens – and in a very short space of time." Clark described the scenes to be "quite emotional" for him as a gay actor portraying adoption in soaps. "It was such a surreal experience – especially as I'm gay, and I'm not expecting to have my own children. So to play someone who has a biological child, and to see a child that looks vaguely like me, was weird and quite emotional. It's been so lovely to portray the importance of adoption – I have a lot of ... family who have adopted, and I think if I ever have kids, I'll do the same."

== Mal ==
Mal
- Hollyoaks character
- Portrayed by: David Grant
- Duration: 2020, 2022
- First appearance: Episode 5370; 21 February 2020
- Last appearance: Episode 5858; 25 May 2022
- Introduced by: Bryan Kirkwood
In-universe information
- Wife: Zoe
- Adoptive sons: Thierry

Mal is the adoptive father of Phoenix Hathaway (Tylan Grant) and Ollie Morgan's (Aedan Duckworth) son, Thierry (Orlando Bannister). He is played by David Grant, and appears alongside his wife Carrie Grant, who plays his on-screen wife, Zoe. Although Ollie gives them a memory book for Thierry to remember him and Brooke by, they leave it behind when they take him. Mal and Zoe are played by Tylan Grant's, who plays Phoenix, real-life parents. Grant commented on his experience in Hollyoaks: "It felt like role reversal. Talia is now so experienced and we were in her environment. We felt like the kids!" Tylan Grant commented on how it felt working with his parents: "It was a really weird feeling filming with my mum and dad." Duckworth also commented on working with Carrie and David: "They were absolutely brilliant and they smashed it," he told Digital Spy. "It was brilliant that, I loved that they were involved. They're such lovely people and I knew them already before they came on set to do the filming. It was fun, a good experience for them and us." Asked if he gave them any advice, Duckworth said: "They didn't need advice, they gave us advice! Not the other way around!"

on 25 May 2022, Mal and Zoe return with Thierry after Ollie reaches out to them after his father Luke Morgan (Gary Lucy), who has dementia, accuses him of abandoning him. Gabriel Clark, who took over the role of Ollie from Duckworth said of working with the pair: "They are absolute legends! I'd seen them on TV growing up and they were so cool."

== Zoe ==
Zoe
- Hollyoaks character
- Portrayed by: Carrie Grant
- Duration: 2020, 2022
- First appearance: Episode 5370; 21 February 2020
- Last appearance: Episode 5858; 25 May 2022
- Introduced by: Bryan Kirkwood
In-universe information
- Husband: Mal
- Adoptive sons: Thierry

Zoe is the adoptive mother of Phoenix Hathaway (Tylan Grant) and Ollie Morgan's (Aedan Duckworth) son, Thierry. She is played by Carrie Grant, who appears alongside her husband David Grant, who plays her on-screen husband Mal. Although Ollie gives them a memory book for Thierry to remember him and Brooke by, they leave it behind when they take him. Mal and Zoe are played by Tylan Grant's, who plays Phoenix, real-life parents. Grant commented on her experience in Hollyoaks: "It was so much fun and a bit scary at the same time. I am mainly a presenter, singer and vocal coach, so it was in uncharted territory for me, but everyone was so lovely to be around and very encouraging." She continued: "As ambassadors of Adoption UK we are currently supporting a number of UK campaigns encouraging more people to adopt, so it’s great that Hollyoaks is covering this story. It’s a fact that BAME children are very hard to place so it’s even more encouraging that the baby we are adopting in Hollyoaks is mixed-race." Tylan Grant commented on how it felt working with his parents: "It was a really weird feeling filming with my mum and dad." Duckworth also commented on working with Carrie and David: "They were absolutely brilliant and they smashed it," he told Digital Spy. "It was brilliant that, I loved that they were involved. They're such lovely people and I knew them already before they came on set to do the filming. It was fun, a good experience for them and us." Asked if he gave them any advice, Duckworth said: "They didn't need advice, they gave us advice! Not the other way around!"

On 25 May 2022, Mal and Zoe return with Thierry after Ollie reaches out to them after his father Luke Morgan (Gary Lucy), who has dementia, accuses him of abandoning him. Gabriel Clark, who took over the role of Ollie from Duckworth said of working with the pair: "They are absolute legends! I'd seen them on TV growing up and they were so cool."

== Ramsey Ley ==
Ramsey Ley
- Hollyoaks character
- Portrayed by: Sabina Cameron
- Duration: 2020-2022
- First appearance: Episode 5383; 11 March 2020
- Last appearance: Episode 5785; 11 February 2022
- Introduced by: Bryan Kirkwood
In-universe information
- Occupation: Doctor
- Adoptive sons: Toby Faroe
- Adoptive daughters: Celeste Faroe

Doctor Ramsey Ley, played by Sabina Cameron, was a doctor who adopted twins Toby Faroe (Bobby Gordon) and Celeste Faroe (Andrea Ali), paying £50,000 for them. She performed social experiments on them when they were young for a research paper. She initially appears as a guest on 11 March 2020 in Episode 5383. Ley was the author of a book named The Red Door, which was a book about parenting. In January 2020, Liberty Savage (Jessamy Stoddart) was raving about the book as she had been reading it as she was pregnant with Brody Hudson's (Adam Woodward) baby, which they were posing as her half-sister, Sienna Blake's (Anna Passey) surrogate. A source told Radio Times: "It seems Hollyoaks has its own parenting guru, Dr Ley! Which probably explains all of the bad dads in the village that serial killer Breda McQueen went after…"

She returns in January 2021 after Celeste calls her and begs her to fix Toby. She confronts Toby at the garage and he reluctantly agrees to let her try and fix his anger issues. However, when away from Toby she calls her publishers, planning to publish a sequel to her book that used Toby as a test subject. She then proceeds to push him past his breaking point with his anger, as part of her plan, and prevents Celeste from seeing him. Doctor Ley continues to try and push Toby past breaking point, however she only makes him tearful rather than angry. Toby later reveals that he's made "terrible mistakes" and Doctor Ley records her plan for him to confess them so she can expose them. Toby admits his murder of Lisa Loveday (Rachel Adedeji) and Doctor Ley tells Toby that he should hand himself in. However, Felix Westwood (Richard Blackwood) intervenes, attempting to stop Toby from handing himself in, although Toby only stops once Celeste arrives and informs them that Doctor Ley never passed her medical exams and never got a licence. Doctor Ley is then subsequently arrested. In February 2022, after being imprisoned for Lisa's murder, Toby has a nightmare about Dr Ley.

== Felix Westwood ==
Felix Westwood
- Hollyoaks character
- Portrayed by: Richard Blackwood
- Duration: 2020–2024
- First appearance: Episode 5396; 30 March 2020
- Last appearance: Episode 6302; 2 February 2024
- Introduced by: Bryan Kirkwood
In-universe information
- Occupation: Mechanic
- Wife: Martine Deveraux (2021–2022)
- Sons: Mitchell Deveraux; Toby Faroe; DeMarcus Westwood
- Daughters: Celeste Faroe; Maria-Carmella McQueen

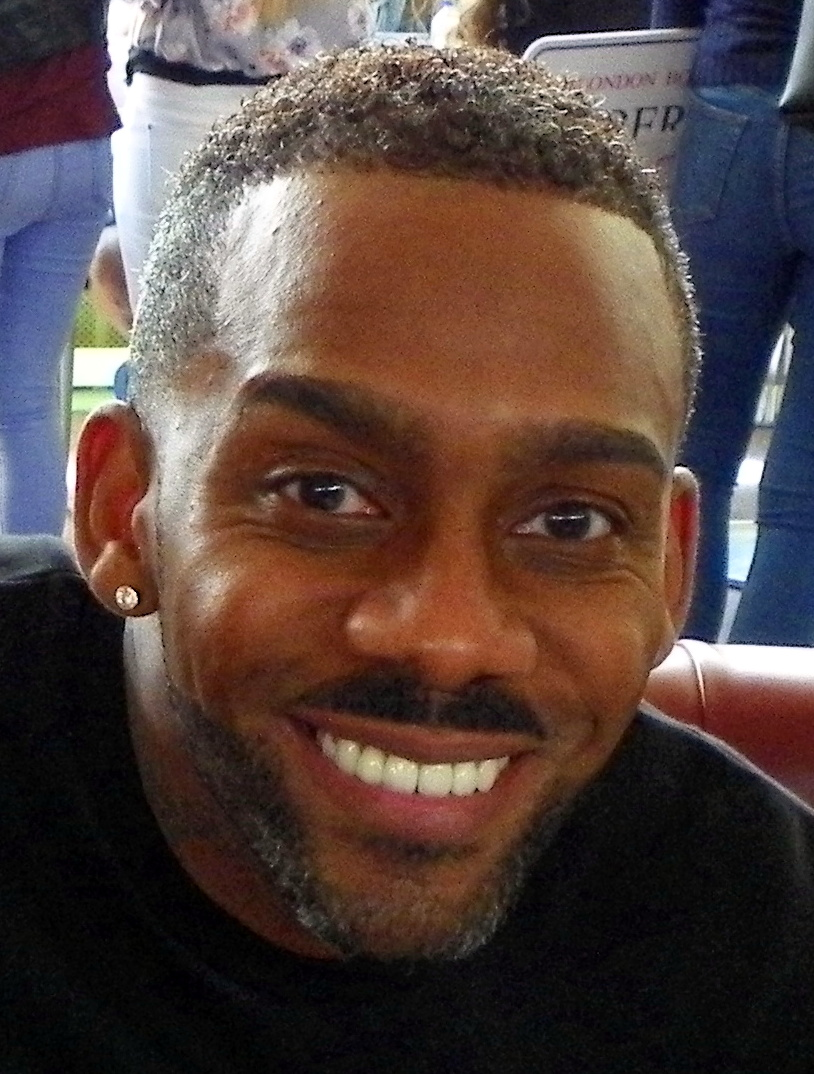
Richard Blackwood portrays the role of Felix.

Felix Westwood, played by Richard Blackwood, made his first appearance on 30 March 2020. The character was announced on 24 January 2020, while speculation about Blackwood being cast on the show started on 23 January 2020 after he was spotted on set. Felix is a past love interest of Martine Deveraux (Kéllé Bryan), and is the father of Mitchell Deveraux (Imran Adams), Toby Faroe (Bobby Gordon) and Celeste Faroe (Andrea Ali). On 3 February 2020 co-star Jamie Lomas who plays Warren Fox announced the character Felix is a face from Warren's past.

On his casting, Blackwood said: "I feel amazed and honoured to join the cast of Hollyoaks. After finishing at EastEnders, I did a few plays and a TV show for America. Now, I feel ready with what I've learnt in my hiatus to be a part of this show. I plan to take my acting to the next level and this character will help tremendously with that growth!" Blackwood's casting was also praised by Adams, who said: "He's such a charming, personable, hardworking guy and I feel like, because of those attributes, he will be a perfect fit in the Deveraux clan who are loved by so many Hollyoaks fans. It's great to see such an iconic show have such diversity, and I know that Hollyoaks will continue to be the leader with that topic and I'm grateful to have him on board." Adams later added that Felix would be a bit of a bad boy, saying: "He is going to be a bad boy. But I think he's going to be one of the bad boys who goes down in the Hollyoaks history books. He will definitely shake things up and I can't wait to work with him, to be honest."

Appearing on Good Morning Britain before his character's debut, Blackwood explained his character's past, saying that Felix is quite a "dark character." He added: "You'll find through the story there's things that have happened that conditioned him to be the way that he is. He's a bit desensitised from emotion in that sense. When he interacts with people, you can see that. You've got to play the truth of why they became that way. What Hollyoaks has done, which I think is beautiful, is they've gone into the history of why he has become that way."

Felix first arrives in the village after he receives a call from Celeste who pretends to be her long-lost mother, Felix's ex-girlfriend, Martine. He arrives in the village in a BMW and flirts with Grace Black (Tamara Wall) and Diane Hutchinson (Alex Fletcher) after splashing Grace and ruining her expensive heels. He offers Sienna Blake (Anna Passey) help as she is struggling to get out a taxi, but she refuses. He arrives at the Deverauxes' front door where his son, Mitchell, and his boyfriend Scott Drinkwell (Ross Adams) are having an argument with his other son Toby, Celeste, Martine, their grandfather Walter Deveraux (Trevor A. Toussaint), and their cousin Lisa Loveday (Rachel Adedeji).

Marianna Manson from Closer Online put Felix on her list of the 11 most iconic black characters in British soap operas, writing, "Felix was introduced in 2020 as an old foe of resident baddie Warren Fox, who he grew up with in a care home and used to bully. But in classic soapland fashion, there's a whole lot more to the story when Felix is revealed to be the father of Mitchell Devereux, Toby Faroe and Celeste Faroe. Absolute SCENES."

== Mark Kelly ==
Mark Kelly, played by Christopher Quinten, made his first appearance on 14 April 2020. The character and casting was announced on 11 February 2020. Mark is the father of established character Kyle Kelly (Adam Rickitt), and the husband of fellow newcomer, Carole Kelly (Diana Weston). On Coronation Street, Quinten had played the role of Brian Tilsley, the father of Rickitt's then character, Nick Tilsley, although the pair never appeared at the same time. In a statement about the characters, Rickitt said: "This is one of the more surreal experiences of my career. After 23 years, I finally get to meet my first onscreen dad, which is truly bizarre. It's an honour to have such well-established actors like Chris and Diana come in to play my parents and I've really enjoyed the scenes we've filmed so far. Plus at least having parents in the show means Kyle has an excuse to regress into adolescence, which comes quite easily to him." Speaking about joining the show, Quinten said: "I've thoroughly enjoyed the scenes I've filmed so far at Hollyoaks, I already love the show and all of the cast, crew and production staff are fantastic and so friendly. Working with Adam after first playing 'his' dad more than thirty years ago is a dream come true, it's a brilliant piece of soap nostalgia, which I hope everyone enjoys."

== Carole Kelly ==
Carole Kelly, played by Diana Weston, made her first appearance on 14 April 2020. The character and casting was announced on 11 February 2020. Carole is the mother of established character Kyle Kelly (Adam Rickitt), and the wife of fellow newcomer Mark Kelly (Christopher Quinten). In a statement about the characters, Rickitt said: "It's an honour to have such well-established actors like Chris and Diana come in to play my parents and I've really enjoyed the scenes we've filmed so far. Plus at least having parents in the show means Kyle has an excuse to regress into adolescence, which comes quite easily to him."

== Cher Winters ==
Cher Winters, played by Bethannie Hare, made her first appearance on 1 June 2020. The character and casting was announced on 12 April 2020. Cher is the daughter of established character Sylver McQueen (David Tag), although before her arrival, he is unaware of her existence. Cher arrives to the village, searching for her father, Sylver, and watches him, Mercedes McQueen (Jennifer Metcalfe) and Warren Fox (Jamie Lomas) from afar. She attends Sylver and Mercedes' vow renewal ceremony, assuming Warren is Sylver, where she privately tells him that she's his daughter. Warren informs her that he was in prison when she was conceived, insisting he is not her father. When Goldie McQueen (Chelsee Healey) offers her a place to stay, she privately approaches Sylver, asking for £3,000 and then she will leave. Sylver agrees to get her the money, but she declines it as she wants to have the opportunity to get to know him better. Cher's mother, Kelly Winters (Jenny Wickham), arrives and informs her that she and her other children are moving to Greece without Cher. When the McQueen family are blackmailed into revealing the family's secrets, Cher discovers that Sylver murdered Breda McQueen (Moya Brady). In return, she reveals that she accidentally murdered her half-sister Liza, due to being jealous of how much attention Kelly gave to her.

== Victor Brothers ==
Victor Brothers
- Hollyoaks character
- Portrayed by: Benjamin O'Mahony
- Duration: 2020–2022
- First appearance: Episode 5420; 16 June 2020
- Last appearance: Episode 5944; 22 September 2022
- Introduced by: Bryan Kirkwood
In-universe information
- Occupation: Drug lord

Victor Brothers, played by Benjamin O'Mahony, made his first appearance on 16 June 2020. The character and casting was announced on 7 April 2020. Victor is the boss of drugdealer Jordan Price (Connor Calland), and is said to be the man behind the County Line drug operation. Calland teased that Victor's arrival will mean that Jordan is "not the nastiest person in the village anymore."

Victor has been described as enigmatic and "complex" with O'Mahoney saying of his character: "Victor is (arguably) a sociopath, who is willing to do whatever it takes to get what he wants – comfortable with manipulating and exploiting vulnerable children to build himself the empire he thinks he deserves. I would argue that Victor sees himself as an efficient businessman working within a violent industry, but there is also another side to him that is addicted to the power and loves to see the fear in people's eyes."

== Cormac Ranger ==
Cormac Ranger
- Hollyoaks character
- Portrayed by: James Gaddas
- Duration: 2020–2021
- First appearance: Episode 5427; 13 July 2020
- Last appearance: Episode 5532; 23 February 2021
- Introduced by: Bryan Kirkwood
In-universe information
- Occupation: Social worker
- Daughters: Summer Ranger

Cormac Ranger, played by James Gaddas, was the former carer of Warren Fox (Jamie Lomas) and Felix Westwood (Richard Blackwood) who worked in a children's home, who first appeared in Episode 5427, which originally aired on 13 July 2020 and appeared on a recurring basis until he was killed off in Episode 5532, which originally aired on 23 February 2021. On the day of Gaddas' debut, Jonathon Hughes from Radio Times reported: "seeing Cormac again opens old wounds for Hollyoaks hard men Warren and Felix and is set to have a huge impact on both their futures, explaining how they became the tough guys they are today."

Warren said that Cormac was kind to him whilst in care, and that he taught Warren how to box, however Felix claimed that Cormac abused him during his stay in the children's home because of his race by mocking his Jamaican accent. Subsequently, Felix along with Warren and Brody Hudson (Adam Woodward) attack Cormac, leaving him in a coma. He later dies after suffering from a heart attack. His daughter, Summer (Rhiannon Clements), hears of his death afterwards and plotted revenge.

== Ripley Lennox ==
Ripley Lennox, played by Ki Griffin, made their first appearance on 20 July 2020. Ripley is a stall-owner at the Cunningham's Grand Bazaar, and in their first appearance they attempt to help Yasmine Maalik (Haiesha Mistry) out of Tom Cunningham (Ellis Hollins) buying her a jumper she doesn't like by lying about the price. However, Tom still buys the item at the inflated price. No announcement was made of Ripley's casting, but it was announced on 10 August of that year that they were part of the regular cast. Actor Griffin was featured in a video on Hollyoaks' social media in February 2021, in which they explained Ripley is non-binary and they would come out to their friends in upcoming scenes; the scenes were scheduled for February to coincide with LGBT History Month. Griffin stated Ripley being non-binary is "wonderful," since it provides representation to a previously unrepresented group of people. Griffin added it was "beautiful" a non-binary actor was portraying the role.

== Faith Hudson ==
Faith Hudson
- Hollyoaks character
- Portrayed by: Uncredited (2020); Elsie and Lyla (2022); Lottie Tatton (2025-2026)
- Duration: 2020, 2022, 2025-2026
- First appearance: Episode 5442; 24 September 2020
- Last appearance: 26th May 2026
- Introduced by: Bryan Kirkwood (2020); Lucy Allan (2022); Hannah Cheers (2025)
In-universe information
- Father: Brody Hudson
- Mother: Liberty Savage
- Grandfathers: Dirk Savage
- Grandmothers: Anna Blake
- Uncles: Dodger Savage; Will Savage; Hilton Cunningham (adoptive)
- Aunts: Sienna Blake
- First cousins: Nico Blake; Myra-Pocahontas Savage-McQueen; Sebastian Blake; Sophie Blake
- Other relatives: Dennis Savage; Tori Devine-Banks

Faith Hudson is the daughter of Liberty Savage (Jessamy Stoddart) and Brody Hudson (Adam Woodward). Liberty originally planned to give Faith to her sister, Sienna Blake (Anna Passey) and Brody after her birth to adopt, but due to postnatal depression, Liberty decides to keep her. Originally, Liberty was meant to be a surrogate for Brody and Sienna, but after miscarrying in December 2019. In November 2020, Faith was kidnapped by Summer Ranger, but it was believed to be Sienna. After her kidnap, Faith lived with Summer's boyfriend, Damon Kinsella (Jacob Roberts) and Brody on The Love Boat.

Faith didn't appear on-screen throughout 2021, however Brody was killed in a hit-and-run at the hands of Warren Fox (Jamie Lomas). Faith appeared on-screen again in 2022, but departed on 15 December 2022, when Liberty accepted a job in New Zealand, to tie in with Stoddart going on maternity leave.

Faith returned on 21 July 2025.

== Summer Ranger ==
Summer Ranger, played by Rhiannon Clements, made her first appearance on 23 November 2020. The character and casting was announced on 19 October 2020. Summer is the daughter of Cormac Ranger (James Gaddas), and arrives in the village after he falls into a coma on account of being assaulted by Warren Fox (Jamie Lomas). After arriving in the village, Summer will set up a baking business in the Grande Bazaar. A Hollyoaks spokesperson said that Summer was "angelic on the outside, but a mischievous minx on the inside." They added that Summer was also "a bright, effortlessly cool tomboy, but when she wants something, she's capable of going to extreme lengths to get it," and teased that she would be a "frenemy" to Sienna in both her life and love. On her casting and character, Clements said: "I was absolutely buzzing and really grateful in our current climate to get the opportunity to join the Hollyoaks family. Summer is fun, sarcastic and I love the zest she brings. She's all sweetness and light but she also has a nasty bite, which is going to be brilliant to play. Once Summer sets her mind on something, be it an idea, a plan or a person, she will do everything she can to make things go her way. Also, I'm incredibly jealous of her wardrobe!"

== Other characters ==
List of other 2020 characters
Character	Episode(s)	Original broadcast date(s)	Actor	Details
Felecité	5336	6 January	Marie Borg	A doctor at the Winter Ball that Edward Hutchinson (Joe McGann) flirts with in order to make Diane Hutchinson (Alex Fletcher) jealous.
Doctor Shields	5339, 5365	9 January, 14 February (2 episodes)	Natalie Grady	A therapist who talks to Tony Hutchinson (Nick Pickard), Sylver McQueen (David Tag) and Jack Osborne (Jimmy McKenna) following the death of Breda McQueen (Moya Brady). She advises Tony to not return home immediately, and that Jack should leave the village for Portugal for a while. After struggling with his PTSD for a while, Tony returns to Doctor Shields to begin weekly sessions.
Doctor Walker	5340	10 January	Lucinda Sinclair	A doctor who informs Sienna Blake (Anna Passey) and Brody Hudson (Adam Woodward) that Liberty Savage (Jessamy Stoddart) has suffered from hyperglycemia.
Doctor Fry	5343-5425	15 January-6 July	Sadie Pickering	A doctor who informs Sienna Blake (Anna Passey) and Liberty Savage (Jessamy Stoddart) that Sienna is unable to donate bone marrow, due to her previously having undergone chemotherapy. She also tells Sienna that her children, Sebastian and Sophie, are in the hospital, revealing to Sienna that Warren Fox (Jamie Lomas) has been lying about their whereabouts. After seeing Joel Dexter (Rory Douglas-Speed) with the children, Maxine Minniver (Nikki Sanderson) uses Doctor Fry to distract him so Sienna can take them back. Doctor Fry also informs Warren that Sienna can't be a donor. When she notices that Sophie and Sebastian have been taken from the ward, she phones the police. After Sebastian is brought back to the hospital, Doctor Fry runs tests on him and tells Sienna that due to an abnormal result, if he doesn't respond to treatment, he'll be unable to get a bone marrow transplant. She informs Sienna and Warren the next day that Sebastian's condition hasn't improved. After moving their appointment ahead, Doctor Dry tells Sienna and Warren that Sebastian's results are showing improvement, and that he can be released from hospital the following day.
Celebrant	5346	20 January	Eve Burley	A celebrant who marries Jesse Donovan (Luke Jerdy) and Courtney Campbell (Amy Conachan).
Marc	5350	24 January	Sean Luttman	A man who Mitchell Deveraux (Imran Adams) meets after arranging a date. However, due to Marc's forwardness in public, Mitchell leaves the date early.
Clayton	5351-5352, 5368, 5391	27-28 January, 19 February, 23 March (4 episodes)	Samuel Edwards	An associate of Liam Donovan's (Jude Monk McGowan) who Liam uses to trick Maxine Minniver (Nikki Sanderson) into becoming an escort. After spending an evening with Maxine, Clayton approaches Liam to ask him a price to stay with Maxine for the night. When Maxine runs out of money to pay her rent, she takes Liam's offer and sleeps with Clayton for money. Clayton visits Maxine again, but she rejects him and attempts to leave. Clayton attempts to force her back inside, but is seen by Mercedes McQueen (Jennifer Metcalfe) and Grace Black (Tamara Wall) who warn Clayton off.
Mason	5352-5234	28-30 January (3 episodes)	Keane Sudworth	A drug dealer who attempts to sell drugs to Imran Maalik (Ijaz Rana), but is turned down. After Imran takes a picture of Mason and his associate, they start chasing him. Mason later plays pool against Juliet Quinn (Niamh Blackshaw) and she hustles him out of £20. When he threatens her, Jordan defuses the situation. Mason next meets Jordan outside of Hollyoaks High, where he sells some drugs to some of the schoolkids. When Sid Sumner (Billy Price) sees Mason there, he tries getting him to leave, but when Imran intervenes the situation evolves into a fight. Nancy Osborne (Jessica Fox) attempts to stop the fight, but ends up getting stabbed by Mason before he flees. After news of the stabbing spreads, Jordan disassociates himself with Mason.
Paramedic	5352	28 January	Helen Buchanan	A paramedic who treats Donna-Marie Quinn (Lucy-Jo Hudson) after she overdoses on ketamine.
Abigail	5356	3 February	Alyssia Jarvis	A woman who Walter Deveraux (Trevor A. Toussaint) sets Mitchell Deveraux (Imran Adams) up on a date with. However, Mitchell gets drunk and attempts to kiss Abigail, causing her to leave.
Cassie	5365-5366	14-17 February (2 episodes)	Amy Jo Clough	Two women who arrive at The Dog in the Pond public house and flirt with Joel Dexter (Rory Douglas-Speed) and Warren Fox (Jamie Lomas). After Joel rejects their advances, due to being engaged, both women accompany Warren upstairs. When Mercedes McQueen (Jennifer Metcalfe) returns from holiday to find Warren, Cassie and Sam at her house, she orders them all out.
Sam	5365-5366	14-17 February (2 episodes)	Amey Woodhall	Two women who arrive at The Dog in the Pond public house and flirt with Joel Dexter (Rory Douglas-Speed) and Warren Fox (Jamie Lomas). After Joel rejects their advances, due to being engaged, both women accompany Warren upstairs. When Mercedes McQueen (Jennifer Metcalfe) returns from holiday to find Warren, Cassie and Sam at her house, she orders them all out.
Beverly	5366-5367	17-18 February (2 episodes)	Kimberly Hart-Simpson	The landlord for Maxine Minniver (Nikki Sanderson) who threatens her with eviction unless Maxine is able to catch up with her late rent payments. When Maxine fails to pay by the arranged deadline, Beverly arrives with two men to repossess some of her items. However, Maxine is able to plead with Beverly in order to keep Minnie's possessions.
Aoife	5369	20 February	Marcella Hazell	The midwife for Brooke Hathaway (Tylan Grant) when she gives birth to Thierry. After Thierry's birth, Aoife congratulates Oliver Morgan (Aedan Duckworth).
Tracey	5369	20 February	Jazmin Hudson-Owen	A nurse who admits Brooke Hathaway (Tylan Grant) as she prepares to give birth. After Thierry's birth, Tracey comes in to talk about feeding Thierry, however she addresses her questions to Nancy Osborne (Jessica Fox), annoying Brooke who snaps at her. Tracey then apologises for the oversight.
Doctor Kane	5374	27 February	Livia King	A doctor who treats Romeo Quinn (Owen Warner) after he is assaulted by Jordan Price (Connor Calland).
Dave	5385	13 March	Ellis Coulter	A sixth form student at a school that Juliet Quinn (Niamh Blackshaw) visits in order to sell drugs. After interacting with Juliet, Dave buys drugs off of her.
Callum	5386	16 March	Noah Valentine	A drug addict who approaches Juliet Quinn (Niamh Blackshaw) to buy drugs off of her, however, she refuses to sell.
Brandi-Louise	5389, 5470	19 March, 11 November (2 episodes)	Georgia Scholes	A student at Hollyoaks High who buys drugs off of Juliet Quinn (Niamh Blackshaw). At a rave hosted by Romeo Quinn (Owen Warner), Brandi-Louise interrupts Juliet and attempts to buy more drugs off of her, revealing that she's a dealer to Peri Lomax (Ruby O'Donnell). Brandi-Louise also videos Oliver Morgan (Gabriel Clark) high on the drugs, before posting it online.
Drunk Man	5391	23 March	Joe Osborne	An associate of Liam Donovan (Jude Monk McGowan) who pretends to be drunk in order to lure Warren Fox (Jamie Lomas) into an ambush, where he is badly beaten.
Addict	5401	13 April	Tom Sidney	An associate of Jordan Price (Connor Calland) who takes drugs off of Sid Sumner (Billy Price) after pretending to pay him. Jordan later met with the addict to confirm that his plan to get Sid and Juliet Quinn (Niamh Blackshaw) to the coast to sell drugs had worked.
Danny	5402	14 April	Gary Hanks	A drug dealer and owner of a drug packaging plant who is visited by Juliet Quinn (Niamh Blackshaw) and Sid Sumner (Billy Price) to drop off some drugs. Danny and a small group confronts Juliet and Sid after Juliet steals Sasha's phone, and begins to assault Sid before pulling out a knife. Before he can stab Sid, Oliver Morgan (Aedan Duckworth) and Imran Maalik (Ijaz Rana) arrive and threaten to phone the police, causing Danny and his group to flee.
PC Fields	5402	14 April	Joe Warner	A British Transport Police officer who gets on a train after spotting Juliet Quinn (Niamh Blackshaw) and Sid Sumner (Billy Price) acting suspiciously. To throw off suspicion, Juliet poses for a selfie with him.
Sasha	5402	14 April	Alicia Thompson	An associate of Danny's who allows Juliet Quinn (Niamh Blackshaw) and Sid Sumner (Billy Price) into the drug packaging plant. After taunting Juliet, she retaliates by stealing Sasha's phone. Sasha is part of the group who confronts Juliet and Sid over the theft and flees when Oliver Morgan (Aedan Duckworth) and Imran Maalik (Ijaz Rana) arrive and threaten to phone the police.
PC Middleton	5415	1 June	Vicky Mills	A police officer who speaks to Kyle Kelly (Adam Rickitt) and Nancy Osborne (Jessica Fox) after Kyle crashes his van into the car of Jordan Price (Connor Calland). Realising that Kyle is high on drugs, Nancy tells PC Middleton that she was driving the car, and is let off without a charge.
Doctor Bevan	5417, 5420	8 June, 16 June (2 episodes)	James S. Barnes	The doctor who talks to Mandy Morgan (Sarah Jayne Dunn) about Darren Osborne's (Ashley Taylor Dawson) depression. After Kyle Kelly (Adam Rickitt) commits suicide, Darren agrees to go to an appointment to talk with Doctor Bevan about his depression.
Kelly Winters	5417	8 June	Jenny Wickham	The mother of Cher Winters (Bethannie Hare) who comes looking for her after a massive argument where she goes to find her father, Sylver McQueen (David Tag), where she meets Mercedes McQueen (Jennifer Metcalfe) and then later abandons her daughter, informing them that she is "their problem." She also informs Cher that she is leaving to Greece with her younger brothers and sisters.
PC Varah	5419	15 June	Nicole Pattinson	A police officer who speaks to Nancy Osborne (Jessica Fox) after Kyle Kelly (Adam Rickitt) commits suicide. As PC Varah is struggling to get through to Kyle's parents to inform them, Jack Osborne (Jimmy McKenna) offers to do so.
Examiner	5422	23 June	Lewis Fletcher	An examiner who conducts a music exam for Sid Sumner (Billy Price). He hints that Sid has passed the exam, but later finds marijuana in Sid's folder and reports him to John Paul McQueen (James Sutton).
Ms. Clement	5426, 5428	7 July, 14 July (2 episodes)	Elianne Byrne	A therapist for Darren Osborne (Ashley Taylor Dawson) for his depression who warns him against cancelling so many appointments with her. Darren later calls her to discuss how Mandy Morgan (Sarah Jayne Dunn) has been reacting to his depression.
Celebrant	5432	8 September	Kate England	A celebrant who marries Scott Drinkwell (Ross Adams) and Mitchell Deveraux (Imran Adams).
Dean Vickers	5435-5581	14 September-3 May 2021	Paul Sloss	The ex-boyfriend of George Kiss (Callum Kerr) who confronts him about past trauma that he put him through. Although Dean attempts to get back together with George, he is rebuked. He returns to try and reunite with George and blames him for turning him into a stalker but is further rebuked. Dean later confronts John Paul McQueen (James Sutton) declaring him and George to be soulmates, and an infuriated John Paul shouts him out of The Dog in the Pond public house. Dean later finds George following an argument with John Paul and convinces him to go on a walk, where they have sex. George records the pair together, using it to make John Paul angry. After John Paul apologies to George for his jealous outburst, George tells Dean to leave the village, and that he'd only used him to get back at John Paul. Dean then warned Courtney Campbell (Amy Conachan) about the kind of boyfriend that George was. George claimed to John Paul that Dean was actually the one who abused him, and motivated John Paul to get Dean out of the village by destroying the tent he was staying in. After George is murdered, Dean returns to village and comes under the suspicion of Nancy Osborne (Jessica Fox), who attempts to get him to confess to George's murder in order to free John Paul. Dean later rumbles her plan, and leaves the village again.
Raff	5436	15 September	Eduard Buhac	The lead singer of a band that Sid Sumner (Billy Price) auditions for. Despite impressing Raff, Sid decides to turn down the offer of playing with the band and to stay in school.
Councillor Lewis	5441	23 September	Bianca Sowerby	A local councillor who opens the water fountain at the Cunningham's Grande Bazaar.
The Doll	5451-5948	12 October-28 September 2022	Molly Jenkins	A doll which was designed by Silas Blissett (Jeff Rawle) and Seth Costello (Miles Higson) to blackmail the McQueen family. The Doll is first seen getting constructed before getting sent to the McQueens at The Dog in the Pond public house, where it initially demands £700 be paid before it reveals their sins. After Mercedes McQueen (Jennifer Metcalfe) decides against paying, The Doll reveals it will now demand £7,000 for each sin, and promises to reveal the sin of "wrath" to the police. After being silent for several days, The Doll reactivates and reveals the next sin it will reveal is "greed", John Paul McQueen (James Sutton) is able to delay the revelation of the sin after promising a £500 down payment, however, The Doll then later demands to be paid £10,000. After several days of silence, The Doll reveals that the next sin revealed will be envy. After failing to pay the ransom, The Doll threatens to reveal the sin, but Mercedes reveals to all gathered in the pub that the sin was about Cher Winters (Bethannie Hare) killing her sister. Initially, The Doll says the McQueens have won the game for not being ashamed of the secret, but it later revealed the sinners would still be punished. After Silas takes Cher back to The Dog after finding her drunk, The Doll plays a video of an unconscious Cher and threatens that she will be killed if the McQueens attempted to outsmart them again. The Doll later reveals that the next sin is gluttony, and that it will reveal the secret in 48 hours. After Mercedes pays the sin off, The Doll announces the next sin as lust, and shows a picture of Mercedes and Warren Fox (Jamie Lomas) close together, however, after Mercedes taunts it for using an image out of context, The Doll reveals to Nancy Osborne (Jessica Fox) that John Paul stole her fiancé's watch in order to pay some of the blackmail off. After John Paul grows angry at The Doll for revealing this, it claims that Goldie McQueen (Chelsee Healey) is the mole feeding information to the blackmailer, although Goldie is able to prove her innocence. Certain that the mole is someone in the family, Mercedes lies to each individual in the McQueen family about having an affair; changing the name of the person she had the affair with for each individual. The Doll then delivers the false information that Mercedes had an affair with Luke Morgan (Gary Lucy), the person that Mercedes told Theresa McQueen (Jorgie Porter) she was having the affair with, thus outing Theresa as the mole in the family.
Will	5472	17 November	Craig Blake	A pilot and ex-boyfriend of Martine Deveraux (Kéllé Bryan) who asks her out in an attempt to reconnect with her. Martine tells her sons Mitchell Deveraux (Imran Adams) and Toby Faroe (Bobby Gordon) that she was not interested in Will and would not be meeting him again.
Doctor Ash	5476, 5478	24 November, 26 November (2 episodes)	Maria Gough	A doctor that Sienna Blake (Anna Passey) calls when she's worried her half-sister, Liberty Savage (Jessamy Stoddart), is suffering from postpartum psychosis. Liberty lies to Doctor Ash and convinces her Sienna is actually attempting to steal Faith from her. When Liberty believes that Sienna has stolen Faith, Liberty runs into Doctor Ash outside of the hospital, before realising that she was a hallucination.
Police Officer	5498	30 December	Therese Bwitanda	A police officer that John Paul McQueen (James Sutton) approaches to find out whether a body in a bodybag is that of his boyfriend, George Kiss (Callum Kerr).
