= County lines drug trafficking =

Trafficking of drugs into British rural areas, often involving child slavery

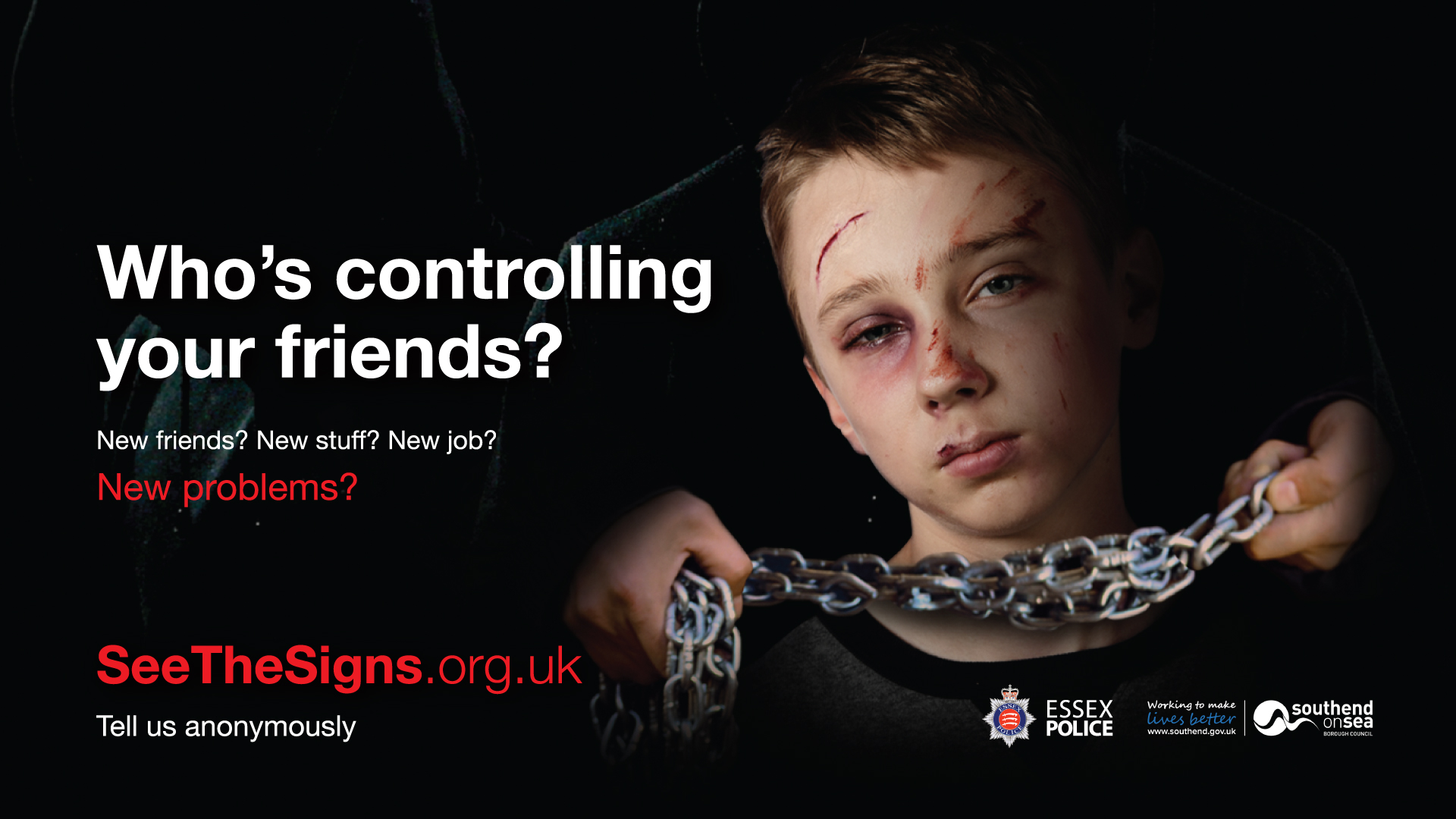
Public ad campaign about county lines trafficking

In the United Kingdom, the county lines drug supply model is the practice of trafficking drugs into rural areas and smaller towns, away from major cities. Criminal gangs recruit and exploit vulnerable children, sometimes including children in pupil referral units and those who have been excluded from school, and exploit them to deal drugs. Some young people are recruited via debt bondage, whereby they enter county lines to pay off drug debts. Many of these activities are forms of modern slavery.

The term "county lines" is used where illegal drugs are transported from one area to another, often across police and local authority boundaries. Lines refers to the phone numbers, or deal lines, dedicated to this activity. The practice is also known by those involved as "going country" ("cunch") or "going OT" ("out there").

== Scale ==
Between the years of 2018 to 2019, National Crime Agency figures showed there were 1,500 drug trafficking routes of this sort in the United Kingdom, rising to 3,000; in that year the agency estimated the total turnover of county lines activities throughout the UK to be roughly £500 million. A 2020 report for the Home Office by Dame Carol Black states that 2,000 teenagers in London were identified as linked to county lines activity. The majority of county lines come from the Metropolitan Police service area taking 15% of the market, followed by the West Midlands Police area at 9% and Merseyside at 7%.

Children are coerced and manipulated to join via the promise of big money. The level of violence increased significantly post-COVID in 2020.

== Causes ==
In 2019, Sadiq Khan, Mayor of London, blamed cuts in police numbers for the rise of county lines gangs.

Also in 2019, police said that they lacked the resources to tackle county lines. They mentioned cuts to youth services may have been a contributing factor. They mentioned it was difficult to get the funding.

The National County Lines Co-ordination Centre opened in September 2018. Jointly run by the National Crime Agency and National Police Chiefs' Council, it aims to share information among police forces and improve protection for victims.

Carol Black's 2020 report for the government on the supply of drugs traces the causes of the phenomenon to a combination of government cuts in youth services and drug recovery services, absence of parents, poor parenting, increased child poverty, school exclusions, and availability of purer forms of drugs.

== Response ==
In 2018, a drug dealer, Zakaria Mohammed, age 21, from Aston, was convicted of offences under the Modern Slavery Act relating to "county lines" activities.

In 2018, The Children's Society charity criticised what it said was an inconsistent approach by professionals working with children, being concerned that, while some police and social workers viewed the practice as child exploitation, others treated vulnerable young people solely as criminals.

In the same year Sadiq Khan, Mayor of London, set up a "rescue and response" programme, which in its first year referred 568 young people to support channels. In 2019, he said that more than 4,000 children and young people had been found to have links with county lines activities.

In October 2019, a nationwide police crackdown led to the arrests of 700 people alleged to be connected to county lines trafficking.

The Crime and Policing Act 2026 introduced a new offence of causing or facilitating a child to commit a criminal offence, and introduced the ability for the police to apply for child criminal exploitation prevention orders to help protect children at risk of criminal exploitation by county lines gangs.

== In popular culture ==
A 2019 episode of the UK TV series Vera entitled "Cuckoo" was based around a "county lines" storyline; as per the story title, that episode also included the related topic of cuckooing, which roughly translates as taking over another person's property for the purposes of drug supply.

In November 2019, Channel 4 soap opera Hollyoaks announced that they would be featuring an issue-led storyline inspired by the county lines trafficking beginning in December of that year. The year-long storyline sees teenagers Juliet Nightingale (Niamh Blackshaw) and Sid Sumner (Billy Price) manipulated by Jordan Price (Connor Calland) and Victor Brothers (Benjamin O'Mahoney) into selling drugs in and near their village.

== See also ==
- Child grooming
- Cuckooing
- Missing children
- Gangs in the United Kingdom
