= Ripley Lennox =

- Hollyoaks character
- Portrayed by: Ki Griffin
- Duration: 2020–22
- First appearance: 20 July 2020
- Last appearance: 8 August 2022
- Introduced by: Bryan Kirkwood
In-universe information
- Occupation: Stall owner

Ripley Lennox is a fictional character from the British soap opera Hollyoaks, played by Ki Griffin. They made their first appearance on 20 July 2022, and the following month it was announced that Griffin had joined the regular cast of Hollyoaks. Ripley was introduced as the owner of the second-hand clothes stall "Sweater Thunberg" and they soon become friends with other teenagers. Ripley later comes out to their friends as non-binary, which made Ripley the first regular non-binary character in a British soap opera. Griffin, who is also non-binary, was proud to portray that and felt lucky to represent their community. Ripley also supports their friend Phoenix Hathaway (Tylan Grant) with their gender identity and the pair later start a romance in a special episode with an all-Black cast, which Griffin was happy to be in. Ripley was also included in a storyline involving crossovers with other British soap operas to raise awareness for climate change. Griffin later left the soap and Ripley's final appearance aired on 8 August 2022, which saw Ripley leave the village to work with homeless transgender teenagers. Ripley was well-received by critics and Griffin said that the response that Ripley brought to representation in Hollyoaks was overwhelmingly positive.

== Casting ==
On 10 August 2020, it was announced that non-binary actor Ki Griffin had joined the cast of Hollyoaks as new regular character Ripley Lennox. Griffin had previously made an appearance as Ripley in the final Hollyoaks episode to air before the transmission break caused by the COVID-19 pandemic in the United Kingdom forcing filming to stop, which was broadcast on 20 July 2020, and it was reported that the character would appear in the soap opera full-time. Ripley was introduced as a friend of established character Tom Cunningham (Ellis Hollins) and it was reported that Ripley would "quickly" befriend other teenage characters Peri Lomax (Ruby O'Donnell), Romeo Nightingale (Owen Warner) and Yasmine Maalik (Haiesha Mistry), and that Ripley would be working at Cunningham's Grand Bazaar in a second-hand clothes shop. At the time of the announcement, Hollyoaks had resumed filming and Griffin was filming on the soap again. In Ripley's initial episode, Yasmine and Tom visit Ripley running the second-hand clothes shop and Ripley helps Yasmine after realising that she does not like the jacket that Tom picked out. The news of Griffin joining Hollyoaks as a regular was announced on the soap's Twitter page, with the tweet reading, "CAST ANNOUNCEMENT 📣 If you haven't already, please give a very warm welcome to Ki Griffin (they/them, she/her, or he/him) who plays Ripley Lennox! 😍 We've already had the pleasure of seeing Ripley on our screens, and there's plenty more to come... Autumn 2020!❤️ #Hollyoaks". Ripley and other new characters were later added to the Hollyoaks opening titles.

== Development ==
In February 2021, Griffin revealed that Ripley is also non-binary and it was reported that upcoming scenes would see Ripley tell this to their friends Oliver Morgan (Gabriel Clark), Phoenix Hathaway (Tylan Grant) (Note: Phoenix at the time was credited and referred to as "Brooke Hathaway".) and Imran Maalik (Ijaz Rana). Channel 4 released a video that same month called What is Non-binary Gender Identity? for LGBTQ History Month, which featured Griffin discussing things such as what a non-binary identity is and what it is like to play Ripley. The actor said, "It's wonderful to have that positive representation for non-binary people, because we never see it, and it is so beautiful to be able to step in to the shoes of Ripley and be able to be like, guys look, a non-binary character played by a non-binary human." The video was available on Hollyoaks' social media channel, and the soap opera also released special customised non-binary Valentines Day cards. Ripley is the first non-binary character to appear on Hollyoaks and the first regular non-binary character to appear in a British soap opera, which Griffin said they were really proud to be playing that. Griffin added, "The response to the representation Ripley brings to the show has been overwhelmingly positive". At London Trans+ Pride 2021, the actor said that they felt lucky to be represent their community within television by portraying Ripley. Griffin also said in another feature:

"I grew up thinking there would never be a place for me in the film and TV industry unless I was behind the camera. But in recent years seeing the lengths those in the industry are going to in order to have not only representation, but positive representation for some of the most marginalised groups in society. Now being able to represent not only the LGBT+ community but also people of colour has really given me faith that the industry is changing for the better."

In March 2021, Phoenix supports Ripley when Ripley confides that their flatmates have an issue with Ripley's gender identity and fears that they will be thrown out and lose their stall. Phoenix suggests that Ripley moves in with Grace Black (Tamara Wall) as she is looking for a lodger. Phoenix and Ripley's friendship grows and Ripley strongly supports Phoenix with his gender identity; when Ripley mentions the non-binary support group, the "illuminating conversation" perks up Phoenix and leads to him making an announcement, and Phoenix ends up telling his friends that he also identifies as non-binary. Phoenix initially came out as non-binary in 2021 after Grant had come out themselves as non-binary, and in 2023 the character came out as a trans man following Grant's transition. Griffin praised Phoenix and Ripley's friendship and was happy that Hollyoaks was representing the non-binary community, telling Inside Soap, "I came into the show as the first non-binary character, and now, a year in, I'm one of two! As Black, non-binary characters, Ripley and [Phoenix's] relationship sets the tone for what, I think, we should be seeing more of on TV. Tylan and I are ourselves non-binary. Being able to put our friendship on screen is a real honour

In August 2021, Griffin teased that Ripley would find a love interest, explaining, "There are a lot of fresh relationships coming up! And a lot of dynamics we haven't necessarily seen on Hollyoaks in a while. We're also going to see Ripley enamoured – totally in love!" However, the actor did not reveal who would be Ripley's new love interest or if it was a new character. The following month, as part of the soap's "Black to Front Project", Phoenix and Ripley were featured in an hour long special episode with an all-black cast. Although Griffin believed that the highlight for viewers in the episode would be the stunt that they were not involved with, Griffin's personal highlight was the "cheeky kiss" that occurs in the episode, although they did not reveal the two characters that would be kissing before the episode's transmission. Griffin added, "I think it's really important because there isn't enough Black representation in film and TV – behind and in front of the lens. To put together an amazing hour-long episode with an all-Black cast proves that there is no reason why there shouldn't be more shows doing similar things." They also said, "I just don't think we have ever had something where we have had so much media specifically created in order to showcase Black voices". Griffin enjoyed working with the episode's director Patrick Robinson and praised him for making an "amazing" environment for the actors to work in.

The theme of the episode was love, and the episode sees Phoenix and Ripley realise that they may like each other more than friends, with Griffin telling Diva, "They have this beautiful friendship and it blossoms into this dating scenario, with Ripley feeling like they are messing up constantly, but [Phoenix] seeing an endearing quality in the fact that Ripley tries so hard", whereas Grant explained, "This episode was really fun because it has that difficult situation when you're like, 'You're so pretty" and they're like, "You're so pretty too" – and then where do you go from there?". Griffin added, "There is so much love in this episode, in so many forms – if you don't feel like you might have a bit of a sob just because you love the world so much after watching it, I will be really shocked." The episode featured Ripley and Phoenix going on three dates in one day and they kiss on third one. Several outfits from the episode were local Black retailers, and Griffin revealed that the episode would begin to show less of a feminine touch in Ripley's outfits. Griffin also liked that the episode's cast were asked to make song suggestions for the episode's soundtrack, which they believed was a "huge part" of the episode. The episode aired on 9 September 2021. The episode featured the first Black non-binary romance in a British soap opera. That same month also featured the debut of Saul Reeves (Chris Charles), then known as Nate Denby, who soon becomes the new roommate of Ripley and Grace.

In November 2021, the five main British soap operas and two medical dramas – Hollyoaks, EastEnders, Emmerdale, Coronation Street, Holby City, Casualty and Doctors – referenced each other as part of a "weeklong crossover event" in an effort to promote 2021 United Nations Climate Change Conference and raise awareness for climate change. The idea was created by Emmmerdale's executive producer Jane Hudson, who said, "Never before have all five soaps and both continuing dramas come together and united in telling one story. And we certainly haven't seen characters pop up in other shows before. This is a real treat for our audience, whilst also allowing us to get across a very important message". Whilst Ripley did not appear in other soap operas, as part of the crossover, an episode in Hollyoaks saw Phoenix and Ripley reference Doctors character Daniel Granger (Matthew Chambers). Phoenix tries to inspire Ripley to go ahead with their plans for a sustainable fashion show at the local market, and when Ripley is about to give up, Phoenix shows them a picture of Daniel and says that he is a doctor who dressed up as World Warrior to raise awareness about recycling, and that they can also make a difference like he did. Trying to fight Ripley's corner, Phoenix later mentions Daniel's efforts when Cindy Cunningham (Stephanie Waring) threatens to shut down Ripley's stall due to low sales. Cindy is initially against selling recycled fashions, but Ripley shows Cindy how the clothing is able to be sustainable and "chic", so Cindy ends up modelling recycled fashions from Ripley's stall. An impressed Kim Fox (Tameka Empson) from EastEnders is then seen reading about Cindy modelling Ripley's recycled clothes.

Phoenix and Ripley end up becoming a romantic couple. Later, Ripley and Saul have "Stall wars" at the market and Ripley tries to outdo Saul. After Phoenix's plan to boost sales at Ripley's stall backfires, the pair have their first fight as Ripley feels that Phoenix does not believe in them. Saul ends up giving Phoenix advice on how to raise Ripley's eco-friendly fashion brand's profile and show Ripley how sorry he is. In 2022, Ripley opens up to Phoenix about their issues with intimacy. Phoenix and Ripley end up breaking up later that year, which Phoenix finds slightly traumatic. Following this, Ripley becomes unsure about their place in the village. In July 2022, a "pensive" Ripley is seen deleting pictures of Phoenix and tells Grace their intention to leave the village, explaining that they and Phoenix are finished and that they call set up a stall anywhere. Ripley also says that they are unsure of where they are headed and have not told Phoenix. Following these scenes airing, Ripley's future on the soap was speculated and a spokesperson told Digital Spy that Ripley would be a returning character. However, Ripley's final appearance aired the following month on 8 August 2022, with their exit storyline seeing the character leaving the village to work with homeless transgender teenagers. Following their departure, Griffin worked on various other projects and explained, "As much as I love the work I did on Hollyoaks, I think as a person who makes things, I've always been more interested in making art and media that is niche and does serve its audience with grace and intellect and dignity."

== Storylines ==
Ripley is introduced as the new stallholder of the second-hand clothing stall "Sweater Thunberg" and befriends various teenagers, including Phoenix Hathaway (Tylan Grant). Ripley is non-binary, and spending time with Ripley makes Phoenix realise that they are also non-binary. (Note: Phoenix later comes out as a transgender man.) Ripley supports Phoenix and gives him advice on their identity. Ripley moves in with Grace Black (Tamara Wall) and they are later joined by Summer Ranger (Rhiannon Clements). Ripley and Phoenix admit their romantic feelings for each other and have three dates in one day as Phoenix says that he will not kiss Ripley until the third date. After Summer is arrested, Saul Reeves (Chris Charles) moves in with Ripley and Grace, and Ripley is unimpressed with him. Saul opens a clothing stall opposite Sweater Thunberg and Ripley rivals with him, but they end up getting along. When Ripley's stall has financial issues, Phoenix organises an eco-friendly fashion show, which rapidly increases sales due to the event going viral on social media. Ripley tells Phoenix they love him, but he runs off. Phoenix tells Ripley he loves them after Ripley has an allergic reaction to mushrooms on pizza; however, Ripley breaks up with Phoenix as they believe they are holding him back, but the pair remain friends. Ripley plans to go travelling but cancels these plans after Saul dies after being stabbed. Ripley then leaves the village after being offered a job working with homeless transgender teenagers.

== Reception ==
Will Stroude from Attitude praised Griffin's casting, writing, "Great strides have been made in soaploand when it comes to LGBTQ representation over the last decade, particularly in Hollyoaks – but Griffin's casting remains a rare example of non-binary people being represented on screen. More please!" Stroude also praised the soap for including Griffin's pronouns in their casting announcement on Twitter. Johnathon Hughes from Radio Times praised Ripley and Phoenix's "sweet friendship that's developing nicely", adding that he was unsure where it was developing but calling it "certainly watchable". Susannah Alexander from Digital Spy wrote that Ripley had become a "much-loved stall holder" since their debut and also noted that they had developed "strong" friendships with other characters, particularly Phoenix. Alexander's colleague, Amy West, speculated that Phoenix and Ripley could start a romance. After Phoenix and Ripley's first fight, Hughes observed how Ripley was unforgiving after their "very tense atmos" with Phoenix. He also found it surprising that it was Saul who was able to "broker peace" between the couple and questioned whether Ripley and Phoenix would survive their first fight.

Stephen Patterson from Metro called the scenes where Ripley came out to their friends "powerful" and wrote, "No, you're crying" in response to Ripley's intentions to leave the village. Patterson's colleague, Maisie Spackman, also called the scenes where Ripley came out powerful and opined that Hollyoaks had been a "strong advocate for LGBTQ+ characters and actors". Valentino Vecchietti from Diva was excited to see the Black to Front episode and highlighted how it would have the first black non-binary romance in a British soap opera through Phoenix and Ripley's romance, calling it a "historic TV moment". Vecchietti also wrote that Ripley was "known for their fantastic style". Patrick Kelleher from PinkNews believed that the existence of characters like Ripley showed that "things are gradually – albeit slowly – improving for trans, non-binary and gender non-conforming people on television". Stefania Sarrubba from Digital Spy called Ripley's intentions to leave the village a "twist" and opined that Ripley seemed set on leaving the village. In a feature for Pride Month 2021, Charlotte Rodrigues from TV Guide's EastEnders Insider included Ripley on their list of the "greatest" LGBTQ+ characters in British soap operas, noting that Griffin made "soap history" as the Ripley was the first non-binary character to appear in a soap opera. In 2023, Alex Whilding from OK! called Ripley "iconic" and believed that Griffin was best known for that role. In 2026, Chantelle Billson from PinkNews wrote that Ripley and Phoenix "provided vital non-binary and trans representation" in Hollyoaks.
