= Goodnight Mister Tom (play) =

- Written by: David Wood
- Subject: 1981 novel Goodnight Mister Tom

Premiere
- Place premiered: Chichester Festival Theatre

Goodnight Mister Tom is a 2011 play by David Wood, based on the 1981 children's novel of the same name by Michelle Magorian. The play earned the Laurence Olivier Award for Best Entertainment at the 2013 Laurence Olivier Awards.

== Plot ==
Early in World War II, William Beech is billetted upon Tom Oakley in rural Dorset. Oakley, a reclusive curmudgeon, has been a solitary resident for 40 years since he became a widower and lost his infant son; Beech is an illiterate, bruised, and starving Deptford evacuee. Mr Oakley nourishes William physically and emotionally until Beech's mother calls for his return to London.

In the second act, Beech is back in Deptford as the Blitz continues around him. With no father figure (his father had died several years earlier), his mother, "a militant Christian of the fire-and-brimstone variety," again influences his emotional demise as she abusively raises a "found" baby daughter.

== Production history ==
Goodnight Mister Tom premiered in 2011 at the Chichester Festival Theatre, directed by Angus Jackson. The production moved to London with previews starting on November 22, 2012 and then ran for 9 weeks from November 27 until January 26, 2013 at the West End Phoenix Theatre, with Oliver Ford Davies as Tom Oakley, Ewan Harris and two other actors alternating as William Beech, and William Price as Zach. Subsequently the production traveled throughout the United Kingdom to locations such as The Everyman Theatre, Aylesbury Waterside Theatre, and Birmingham's New Alexandra Theatre. In December 2015, a new production of Goodnight Mister showed at the Duke of York's Theatre in London from December 2015 until February 2016. The show opened again in London on 25 July 2018 and ran until the 25th August 2018 at the Southwark Playhouse. The production starred James Sampson and Eoin McKenna as Tom Oakley, with other cast including Millie Brolly, Ethan Quinn and Bradley Riches.

== Awards and nominations ==
The play won its nomination at the April 28, 2013 Laurence Olivier Awards for Best Entertainment.

== Critical reception ==
Michael Billington, after explaining that he had not read the source material, said that he was "struck by the story's debt to Oliver Twist: in both, a serially abused boy is rescued, and briefly lost, by a solitary senior." Billington praised the cast's performances and called the production "a strong seasonal show, unafraid to target the emotions." Jane Shilling of The Daily Telegraph noted that "Ewan Harris as William touchingly conveys the flowering of the crushed child...but the show is stolen by William Price as Zach, whose outrageously over-the-top performance lights up the stage."

=== West End production ===
Year	Award	Category	Nominee	Result
2013	Laurence Olivier Awards (2013)	Laurence Olivier Award for Best Entertainment		Won
