= Carrie Grant =

British television presenter (born 1965)

Carrie Grant MBE
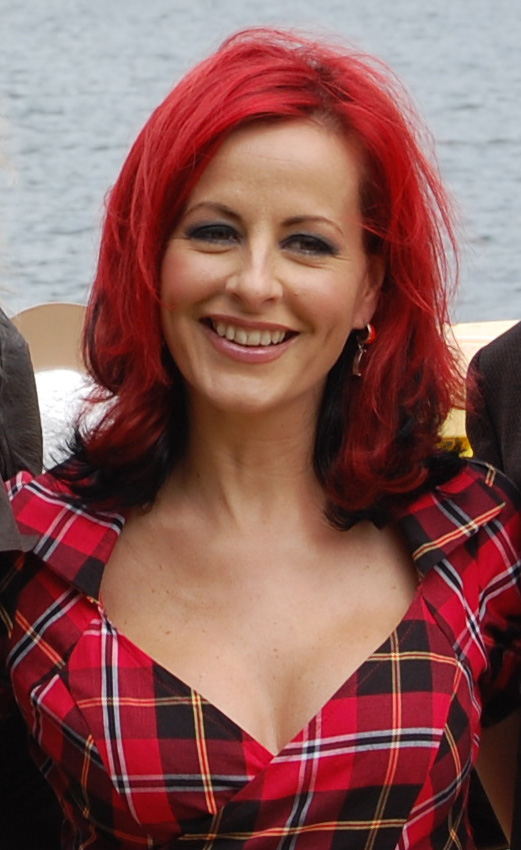
- Grant at the 2008 Red Bull Flugtag
- Born: Caroline Vanessa Gray; 17 August 1965 (age 61); Enfield, London, England
- Occupations: Television presenter; singer; vocal coach
- Years active: 1983–present
- Spouse: David Grant
- Children: 4, including Olive and Tylan

Caroline Vanessa Grant MBE (née Gray, born 17 August 1965) is an English television presenter, vocal coach, and singer.

== Career ==
Grant is known for her work on the television talent contests Fame Academy, Comic Relief Does Fame Academy, and Pop Idol, and the children's television series Carrie and David's Popshop, together with her husband and colleague David Grant. She first came to fame as a singer in her own right with the pop group Sweet Dreams in 1983, when they represented the United Kingdom at the Eurovision Song Contest that year with the song "I'm Never Giving Up". They finished in the top six. In 2008, she was the spokesperson for the UK vote. In 2009, Grant was featured in the tenth episode of the second series of Total Wipeout.

Since 2010, Grant has been a regular reporter on BBC One's magazine programme The One Show. In 2012, she appeared on the ITV documentary, The Talent Show Story where she spoke about her time as a judge and coach. In May 2014, it was announced that Grant would be head of the United Kingdom national jury in the Eurovision Song Contest 2014. In January 2018, Grant participated in And They're Off! in aid of Sport Relief. In 2020, Carrie appeared in the Channel 4 soap opera Hollyoaks as Zoe, alongside husband David and Tylan, who regularly portrays Brooke Hathaway in the soap.

In 2023 she was a guest on Channel 5's Eurovision: 30 Unforgettable Moments a chart countdown based on the song contest, with David, a regular music business talking head expert for Channel 5, joining her for the programme.

== Personal life ==
Carrie and her husband David have four children: Olive, Tylan, Arlo and an adopted son, Nathan. All of their children are neurodivergent, and Grant herself was diagnosed with autism in January 2023. Carrie and David are both Christian, and run a church plant in their home.

Grant has suffered from Crohn's disease since the age of 18 and has been praised by science education charity Sense about Science for her efforts in raising the profile of the disease without making any scientifically unsound claims about available therapies. She is a supporter of the Labour Party and addressed its conference in 2012, about why she valued the National Health Service.

Grant is also Patient Lead at The College of Medicine and has spoken at their conferences on involving patients in treatment choices.

Grant was appointed Member of the Order of the British Empire (MBE) in the 2020 Birthday Honours for services to music, media and charity.
