= Olive Gray =

British actor (born 1994)

- Gray in 2026
- Born: Olive Grant; 3 December 1994 (age 31); London, England
- Education: Guildhall School of Music and Drama
- Years active: 2005–2009; 2016–present
- Parents: David Grant (father); Carrie Grant (mother)
- Family: Tylan Grant (brother)

Olive Grant (born 3 December 1994), known professionally as Olive Gray, is a British actor. They first gained prominence through their role in the CBBC series Half-Moon Investigations (2009). They have since starred in the Paramount+ series Halo (2022–2024).

== Early and personal life ==
Gray is the eldest child of Fame Academy judges and singers David and Carrie Grant. Gray has three siblings, including Tylan Grant. Gray was diagnosed with ADHD as a teenager, in addition to having dyspraxia and dyslexia, and their siblings are all also neurodivergent. Gray studied at Queenswood School, Hertfordshire and went on to study drama at Guildhall School of Music and Drama, graduating in 2016.

Gray is non-binary and queer, and uses they/them pronouns.

== Career ==
In 2005, Gray made their debut acting appearance in the popular television series The Story of Tracy Beaker as Alice. In 2007 and 2008 they appeared in EastEnders as Bernadette Logan, a girl who bullied Abi Branning (Lorna Fitzgerald). In 2009, they made a major appearance, portraying Mia Stone in the TV series of Half Moon Investigations. In 2016, Gray played a yoga girl in BBC's Fleabag. They appeared in an episode of the sitcom Uncle in 2017 as Anna. They also appeared as Miranda Keyes in the Paramount+ series Halo in 2022. In June 2023, they played the role of Molly in the new play "Spy for Spy" also starring Amy Lennox at Riverside Studios.

== Filmography ==
=== Film ===
Year	Title	Role	Notes
2018	Teen Spirit	Lisa	
2020	Sulphur and White	Zara	
2020	Double Tap	Chilli	Short film
2020	Rose	Amber	
2023	Original Skin	Lexi	Short film
2025	Surviving Earth	Maria	
TBA	Full Fat	Grace	Short film. Pre-production

=== Television ===
Year	Title	Role	Notes
2006	The Story of Tracy Beaker	Alice	Main role; series 5; 11 episodes. Credited as Olivia Grant
2007–2008	EastEnders	Bernadette	Recurring role; 8 episodes. Credited as Olivia Grant
2009	Half Moon Investigations	Mia Stone	Main role; episodes 1–13. Credited as Olivia Grant
2016	Fleabag	Yoga Girl 2	Series 1; episode 2
2017	Uncle	Anna	Series 3; episode 2: "Bringing Sexy Back"
2017	Year Million	Jess	Main role; mini-series; episodes 1–5
2018	Home from Home	Petra Dillon	Main role; episodes 2–7
2018–2020	Save Me	Grace	Series 1; episode 6, & series 2; episodes 1–6
2019	Sex Education	Kate	Series 1; episode 2
2019	Pure	Helen	Recurring role; episodes 1 & 5
2019	Dark Money	Jess Mensah	Main role; mini-series; episodes 1–4
2022, 2024	Halo	Dr. Miranda Keyes	Main role; seasons 1 & 2; 17 episodes
2024	Kidnapped: The Chloe Ayling Story	Amber	Episode 5
2025	Reunion	Anna Shenford	Episodes 1–4
2026	It Gets Worse	Sam	Main role; episodes 1–6

=== Theatre ===
Year	Title	Role	Theatre
2023	Spy for Spy	Molly	Riverside Studios
