= Niamh Blackshaw =

English actress (born 1998)

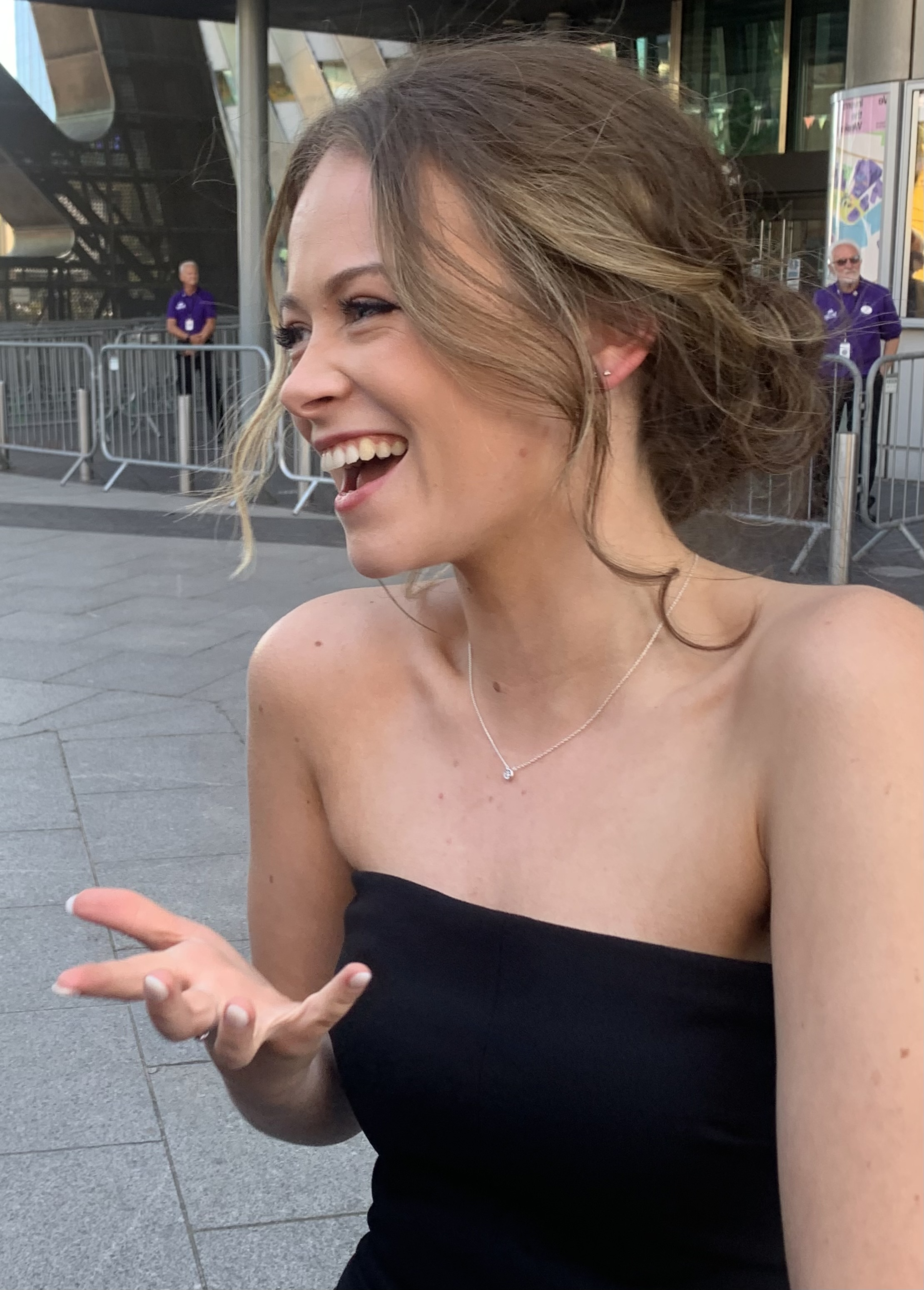
- Blackshaw in 2023
- Born: Niamh Kate Blackshaw; 19 November 1998 (age 27); Bolton, Greater Manchester, England
- Education: Canon Slade School; University of Oxford
- Occupation: Actress
- Years active: 2017–2024
- Television: {{Plainlist|: Coronation Street; Hollyoaks; Waterloo Road; Waffle The Wonder Dog
- Partner: Angus Castle-Doughty (2022–2026)

Niamh Kate Blackshaw (born 19 November 1998) is an English actress. She made her television debut in a Mr Kipling advert before joining the ITV soap opera Coronation Street (2017) as Lara Cutler. She then played Juliet Nightingale in the Channel 4 soap opera Hollyoaks (2018–2023), for which she was nominated for Best Leading Performer at the 2023 British Soap Awards. Following her exit, she joined the cast of Waterloo Road (2025) as Agnes Eccleston.

== Early and personal life ==
Niamh Kate Blackshaw was born on 19 November 1998 in Bolton, Greater Manchester. Prior to studying acting, Blackshaw trained as a dancer, and at the age of eleven, she began attending Rossendale Dance and Drama Centre, where she completed her LAMDA and Trinity exams. She also attended Canon Slade School in Bolton, where she studied Latin for her A-Level exams, amongst other subjects. Blackshaw was interested in attending Cambridge University full-time, until she pursued acting as a career. However, she later began studying at the University of Oxford part-time, alongside acting.

She has been in a relationship with actor Angus Castle-Doughty since 2022.

== Career ==
Blackshaw began her acting career appearing in television advertisements, including an advert for Mr Kipling. In 2017, she appeared in five episodes of the ITV soap opera Coronation Street as Lara Cutler. Her character died by suicide after being groomed by Nathan Curtis (Christopher Harper) and his gang. In March 2018, she made an appearance in the short film Landline. On 4 September 2018, it was announced that she would be joining the Channel 4 soap opera Hollyoaks as Juliet Nightingale, and she made her first appearance on 21 November 2018. Her storylines in the soap included discovering her father is Mac Nightingale (David Easter), being groomed into a county lines drug trafficking gang, coming out as a lesbian and developing a romance with Peri Lomax (Ruby O'Donnell). For her portrayal of Juliet, she has been nominated for Best Newcomer at the Inside Soap Awards and two nominations for Best Partnership alongside Lysette Anthony and O'Donnell, as well as being nominated for Best Leading Performer at the 2023 British Soap Awards.

After a cancer storyline was devised for her character, it was announced that Blackshaw would be leaving her role as Juliet in 2023, after five years on Hollyoaks. Following her exit, she was cast as Abi in the 2024 short film Hide. It was created by Ian Curtis, who had worked with Blackshaw on Hollyoaks. He wrote the character with her in mind and made the decision to donating 10% of the film's profits to Blackburn Food Bank, which Blackshaw's family help to run. Blackshaw then appeared in the BBC drama The Jetty, as well as being cast in the fifteenth series of Waterloo Road. In 2026, she guest starred in the 5 procedural drama series Ellis.

== Filmography ==
Year	Title	Role	Notes
2017	Coronation Street	Lara Cutler	5 episodes
2018–2023	Hollyoaks	Juliet Nightingale	Regular role
2023	SnapCatch	Holly	Short film
2024	Hide	Abi	Short film
2024	The Jetty	Rosie	2 episodes
2025–present	Waterloo Road	Agnes Eccleston	Main Role
2026	Ellis	Jade Bell	2 episodes

== Awards and nominations ==
Year	Ceremony	Category	Nominated work	Result	Ref.
2019	Inside Soap Awards	Best Newcomer	Hollyoaks	Nominated	
2019	Inside Soap Awards	Best Partnership (with Lysette Anthony)	Hollyoaks	Nominated	
2021	I Talk Telly Awards	Best Soap Partnership (with Ruby O'Donnell)	Hollyoaks	Nominated	
2023	The British Soap Awards	Best Leading Performer	Hollyoaks	Nominated	
2023	National Television Awards	Serial Drama Performance	Hollyoaks	Nominated	
2023	Inside Soap Awards	Best Partnership (with O'Donnell)	Hollyoaks	Nominated	
