= Tylan Grant =

English actor

- Born: 9 October 2001 (age 24); London, England
- Occupation: Actor
- Years active: 2015–present
- Television: Hollyoaks
- Parent(s): David Grant; Carrie Grant
- Relatives: Olive Gray (sibling)

Tylan Grant (born 9 October 2001) is an English actor, known for playing Phoenix Hathaway in the Channel 4 soap opera Hollyoaks. For his role as Phoenix/Brooke, Grant was nominated for Best Newcomer at the 2019 British Soap Awards, as well as Celebrity of the Year at the 2019 National Diversity Awards.

== Early and personal life ==
Tylan Grant was born in 2001 in London, to parents David and Carrie Grant. Grant has three siblings, including Olive Gray.

Grant was diagnosed with autism spectrum disorder in 2009, at the age of seven, and has spoken about the difficulties he faced while attending school, due to there being little awareness on the syndrome at the time. In a piece for i newspaper, he stated that teachers did not believe that he was autistic, and that nobody at school understood him.

Grant also has dyscalculia, is a trans man and uses he/him pronouns.

== Career ==
Grant made his professional acting debut in an episode of the CBBC sitcom So Awkward as Greta Masters. Then in 2018, he was cast in the Channel 4 soap opera Hollyoaks as Brooke Hathaway, making his first appearance on 10 July 2018. Grant is the first BAME actor to play an autistic character on a television series. Grant appeared on Loose Women, where he explained that he is different to Brooke, since they have different forms of autism. He added how exciting it was to represent autism. In 2020, Grant's parents appeared in the soap as Mal and Zoe, the adoptive parents of Brooke's newborn child. In 2023, after he had transitioned to a trans man, Hollyoaks changed his character's name to Phoenix, which Grant appreciated.

== Filmography ==
Year	Title	Role	Notes
2015	So Awkward	Greta Masters	Episode: "Space Over"
2018–2024	Hollyoaks	Phoenix Hathaway	Regular role
2018	Loose Women	Himself	Guest appearance
2019	Good Morning Britain	Himself	Guest appearance
2019	This Morning	Himself	Guest appearance

== Awards and nominations ==
Year	Award	Category	Result	Ref.
2018	Digital Spy Reader Awards	Best Newcomer	Eighth	
2019	The British Soap Awards	Best Newcomer	Nominated	
2019	Inside Soap Awards	Best Young Actor	Longlisted	
2019	National Diversity Awards	Celebrity of the Year	Nominated	
