= Billy Price (actor) =

English actor

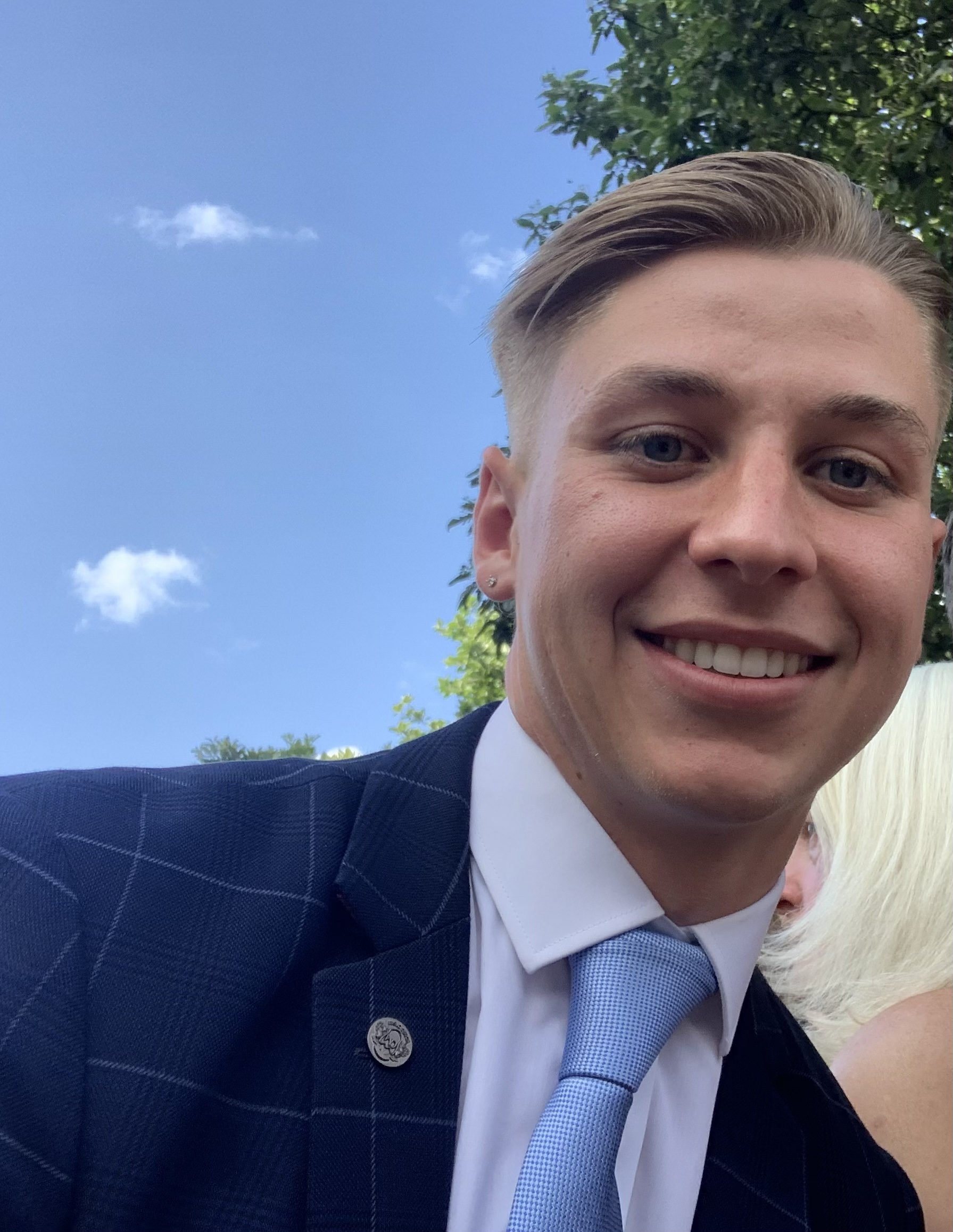
- Price in 2022
- Born: William Price; 22 April 2000 (age 25); Bishop's Stortford, Hertfordshire, England
- Occupation: Actor
- Years active: 2012–present
- Television: Hollyoaks

William Price (born 22 April 2000) is an English actor, known for playing Sid Sumner in the Channel 4 soap opera, Hollyoaks. Prior to joining Hollyoaks, Price appeared in various theatre productions including Goodnight Mister Tom and To Kill a Mockingbird. For his role as Sid, he was nominated for a National Television Award for Serial Drama Performance.

== Early life ==
William Price was born on 22 April 2000 in Bishop's Stortford, Hertfordshire. He attended Northgate End primary school and the Bishop's Stortford High School. He has stated that his first interest in acting was when he was 10, and saw a production of Billy Elliot the Musical; he turned to his mother and stated that he wanted to pursue acting, and signed up for an audition for an acting school on the way out. Until the age of 18, Price competed in cricket and rugby tournaments, but chose to pursue acting as a career.

== Career ==
Price made his professional acting debut in 2012, in a production of Peter Pan as Lost Boy. He then appeared in various West End theatre productions, such as Goodnight Mister Tom in 2012, where he played the role of Zach. He also starred in a touring production of To Kill a Mockingbird as Jem from 2014 to 2015. Price has stated that this production "set in stone" the idea that he wanted to be an actor, and that it helped to "sculpt" his acting skills. From 2018 to 2019, Price appeared in the Nickelodeon comedy series SHHH! as Jack. He also starred in the award-winning short film Patsy. Later that year, he was cast in the Channel 4 soap opera Hollyoaks as guest character Sid Sumner. Following his guest appearance, he auditioned for two roles on the BBC soap opera EastEnders; Hunter Owen and Bobby Beale. He explained that he made it "quite far" into the audition process, but other actors were chosen. Days later, his character on Hollyoaks was promoted to a series regular. In 2021, he received a shortlist nomination for Serial Drama Performance at the 26th National Television Awards for his portrayal of Sid. Price made the decision to leave Hollyoaks in 2022. Then in March 2023, he played Kyle Mainwaring in an episode of the BBC soap opera Doctors.

== Stage ==
Year	Title	Role	Venue
2012	Peter Pan	Lost Boy	Harlow Playhouse Theatre
2012	Oliver!	Charley Bates	Rhodes Theatre
2013	Goodnight Mister Tom	Zach	Phoenix Theatre & UK No.1 Tour
2014–2015	To Kill a Mockingbird	Jem	Regents Park Open Theatre, The Barbican & UK No.1 Tour

== Filmography ==
Year	Title	Role	Notes
2018–2019	SHHH!	Jack	Main role
2019	Funky Line	Greg	Short film
2019	Patsy	Toby	Short film
2019–2022	Hollyoaks	Sid Sumner	Series regular
2020	Out Etc.	Elliott	Short film
2020	Anomalous: The Birth	Matthew Williams	Film
2023	Doctors	Kyle Mainwaring	Episode: "Horse to Water"

== Awards and nominations ==
Year	Award	Category	Nominated work	Result	Ref.
2021	National Television Awards	Serial Drama Performance	Hollyoaks	Nominated	
2021	Inside Soap Awards	Best Actor	Hollyoaks	Nominated	
2021	TVTimes Awards	Favourite Soap Star	Hollyoaks	Nominated	
2021	I Talk Telly Awards	Best Soap Performance	Hollyoaks	Nominated	
