= Sid Sumner =

Fictional character from Hollyoaks

- Hollyoaks character
- Portrayed by: Billy Price
- Duration: 2019–2022
- First appearance: Episode 5164; 9 May 2019
- Last appearance: Episode 5955; 7 October 2022
- Introduced by: Bryan Kirkwood
In-universe information
- Occupation: Drug dealer; Police apprentice
- Father: Stuart Sumner
- Adoptive mother: Leela Lomax
- Stepmother: Alice (until 2019)
- Brothers: Daniel Lomax (adoptive)
- Sisters: Peri Lomax (adoptive)
- Half-brothers: Aiden
- Half-sisters: Violet
- Uncles: Ste Hay (adoptive)
- Nieces: Steph Cunningham-Lomax (adoptive)
- First cousins: Jordan Price; Leah Barnes (adoptive); Lucas Hay (adoptive); Hannah Hay-O'Connor (adoptive)

Sid Sumner is a fictional character from the British Channel 4 soap opera Hollyoaks, played by Billy Price, who made his first appearance on 9 May 2019. He is introduced as the son of recurring character Stuart Sumner (Chris Simmons) and joins several established characters when he begins to attend Hollyoaks High. He initially appears as part of the show's high profile far-right extremism storyline in a guest role, but was promoted to a series regular after it concluded when the producers began to plot a year-long county lines drug trafficking storyline. He made an unannounced departure on 7 October 2022.

In addition to the far-right and drug trafficking plots, Sid's other notable storylines include his adoption by Leela Lomax (Kirsty-Leigh Porter), his ambitions to become a singer-songwriter, a relationship and later friendship with Juliet Nightingale (Niamh Blackshaw) and his subsequent heartbreak when she comes out as a lesbian and becoming an amputee after his leg is run over by Peri Lomax (Ruby O'Donnell) while he is under the influence of ketamine. Price received acclaim for his performance as Sid, receiving several awards nominations.

== Casting and characterisation ==
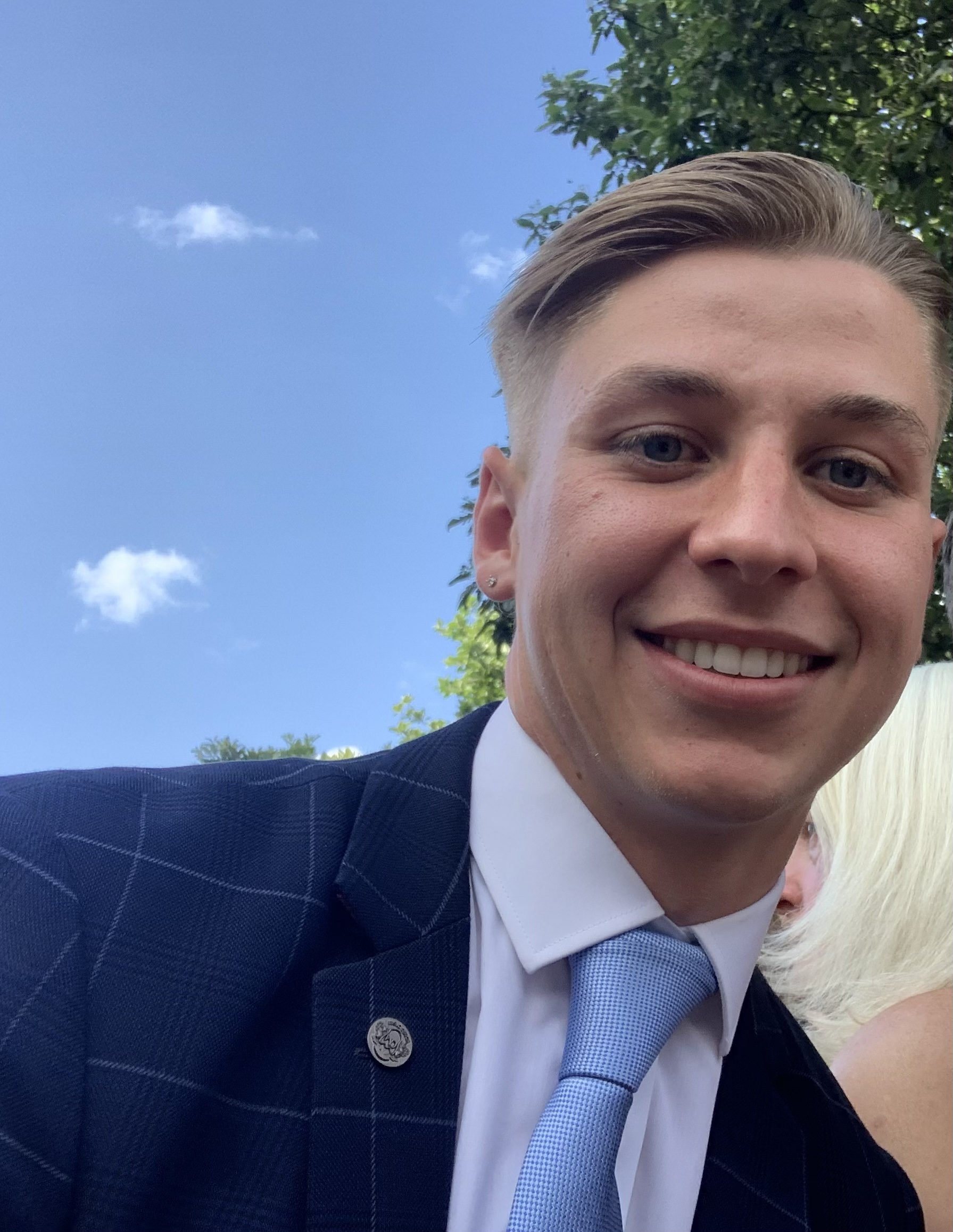
Billy Price (pictured) portrayed Sid Sumner.

Price's casting was announced on 9 May 2019 as part of the show's extremism plot starring Ste Hay (Kieron Richardson), with news outlets noting that Sid would immediately start making racist comments towards fellow student Imran Maalik (Ijaz Rana). It was subsequently revealed on 17 October 2019 that Price had been promoted to a series regular following the conclusion of the far-right storyline, stating that "the County Lines plot will be one of Hollyoaks' biggest stories of 2020, involving all of the young characters and the much-loved families. Alongside familiar faces like Romeo, Tom, Charlie and Ella, we'll see Sid closely involved in the dramatic year-long storyline". Impressed by Price's work during the extremism storyline, the writers decided they wanted to give Sid a big, hard-hitting storyline and develop his character by introducing Connor Callard as his cousin Jordan Price, a drug dealer who would draw Sid into the world of county lines drug trafficking.

== Development ==
=== Extremism ===
When discussing why Sid supports his father, Price explained that Sid has been brought up to believe that "you should always be loyal to your family" because Stuart intentionally isolated him from others so that he could instill him with his racist views. When Sid betrays Stuart, Price noted that "Even though Sid didn't agree with what his dad, Stuart was doing, he still stuck by him, right until the last moment. Sid is very loyal, although misplaced, until it's at the tipping point". In an interview with Metro, Price reflected on the moment Sid killed his father in order to save Ste noting that "I think what's going through his head is to save Ste, because as much as Ste is part of the group, he's been groomed into it all. I think him and Sid get quite close towards the end and he feels as if they're both in kind of the same situation, as Sid's been brought up in this lifestyle, and Ste's been dragged into this lifestyle — and there's no escape for either of them". He also explains how Sid's upbringing ultimately influences his decision, stating that "I always say you're a product of your own environment. Sid's been brought up around them views. If your parents tell you ‘this is right and this right’ and then you're going to just believe it, as that's what your parents say and you think they're always right.’ ‘I think that plays a huge part in what happens at the end, because — as much as what happens is horrible, it's kind of relief."

Following Stuart's death, Price expressed excitement about Sid's future, adding that "now that his dad's gone, Sid can find himself as his own person. Get to make his own opinions about life, his own views, and he can like who he wants to like. He has that freedom now to just be his own person, which is really nice because that gives me a chance as an actor and Sid, as a character, to play with all the new stuff that he hasn't been able to do before. Hollyoaks are definitely exploring his vulnerability quite a lot, so it's really nice as an actor to be a part of that. There is so much area there for them to explore with Sid — what happened with his dad, the vulnerability, the relationships he's never been able to have, the views that he used to have that he now needs to get over. There's literally so much and I think it'll be a great chance for them to create a new character that everyone wants to get to know".

Of Sid's first big storyline, Price remarked that he felt "honoured to have been involved in the far-right story. If you don't tackle problems that occur in everyday life, you're never going to learn and move on from them. If you just beat around the bush, then it could keep happening. I think it's great that a national TV show like Hollyoaks has addressed it. We have a younger audience and we're teaching them this is wrong from a very early age."

=== Relationships ===
Sid's first romantic connection is with classmate Juliet, with whom he begins a relationship with. However, when Juliet does not feel ready to have sex with him, he labels her frigid which leads to Juliet questioning their relationship and her sexuality in general, and the pair break up. Of this development, Price noted that "Sid's not as naïve as everyone thinks. At the minute he's doing all the chasing with Juliet, but there's only so much he can do without getting something back, and this is where he starts to realise that maybe that interest is somewhere else". Sid confesses that he still loves her but she then admits to him that she is a lesbian. Although heartbroken, Sid supports Juliet and promises that it won't change anything between them. Niamh Blackshaw, who plays Juliet, noted that at that point, their dynamic changed from a romantic one to that of a friendship. She stated that Juliet and Sid have a "really good friendship", and are "soul mates rather than lovers", with "no romance between them". When the pair became involved in the county lines storyline, Blackshaw added that without Sid supporting her, Juliet would "crumble", adding: "It's only because the two of them work as a team that they're able to go to a local party, and they manage to do what is asked of them."

=== Drug trafficking ===
When the county lines storyline was announced, Price stated that he "was excited and to be a big part of it is a pleasure. It's the same with the radicalisation storyline, it was so good because it was such a relevant topic that everyone needed to chat about. I've been a part of two strong storylines, I'm very, very lucky and honoured because they're big, big topics in the news". He later expanded upon some of Sid's decision making adding that "Sid's decided to work for Jordan because he just wants to protect Juliet, which is kind of cute. Even though she's clearly not interested in him, he cares about her and wants her to be alright. He knows what Jordan's like and knows how manipulative he can be, so Sid's keeping an eye out for her. Sid doesn't have any family left apart from Jordan. Sid has been brought up to think that blood is thicker than water". He also added that Sid feels pressure to save Juliet because "he thinks she needs to watch herself and watch out for Jordan. But she gets manipulated, she falls in love with that lifestyle and she's trapped in this bubble. Trying to get her out of it is very difficult". Of the dynamic between Sid and Jordan, Price added that "you get the vibe that Sid doesn't want to be working for Jordan and when Jordan asks him to do something, Sid will answer back a bit because he thinks he can. But then he has to put on a front, he has to sell the drugs and deal with bad people. Sid's getting himself in too deep".

=== Disability ===
When it was announced that Hollyoaks was going to make Sid an amputee following an accident while under the influence of drugs, many television critics expressed their hope that the show would do the storyline justice and would avoid the pitfalls that fellow soaps EastEnders, Emmerdale and Coronation Street had fallen into when dealing with disabled characters, especially those played by able-bodied actors, such as finding "miracle" cures to get out of exploring the character's experiences, not giving disabled characters as much screen time or important storylines as the other characters, defining a character by their disability or portraying disabled characters as miserable all the time because of their condition. Digital Spy praised Hollyoaks for giving Sid agency by allowing him to make the decision to sign the amputation forms and having him seek out advice and support online.

Describing what leads Sid to take ketamine in the first place, Price explained that "Juliet is Sid's best friend, and he was there for her when she told him she was gay so when Sid finds out that she's been with another guy, it seems as if he's not good enough. It hits him hard, and that's when he's ready to just give up on everything" and that this betrayal, coupled with how Sid is "terrified" and "scared for his life" of Jordan telling his boss Victor that Sid called the police on Jordan causes Sid to end up "going down a dark path" and that "everything just builds and builds". Following the amputation, Price notes how the accident affects Sid's mental state, describing how "Sid was worried about what people thought of him before – however, after this, he feels as though all eyes are on him. All of a sudden people start judging him, and he begins to feel like an outsider".

Melissa Parker from Digital Spy praised Hollyoaks' portrayal of disability because they do not treat "disabled people as one-dimensional props but as living, breathing people living mundane lives." Parker opined that other shows could learn from Hollyoaks, "especially when it comes to ableism, discrimination in favour of non-disabled people, as this is something that people with disabilities experience every day and is rarely discussed in the media."

== Storylines ==
When Sid's father Stuart moves to Hollyoaks, Sid is enrolled at Hollyoaks High, where he harasses Muslim student Imran Maalik after hearing his father argue with Imran's family. Sid then reports Imran to headteacher Sally St. Claire (Annie Wallace) for threatening to blow up the school, which Imran has not done. An investigation is made by the anti-extremist group Prevent into Sid's claim, which is deemed to be malicious. Imran admits to Sally that Sid has been racially abusive towards him. He also launches a prejudiced attack on Scott Drinkwell (Ross Adams) while he is dressed in drag. Sid later befriends Juliet Quinn (Niamh Blackshaw) and asks her on a date. As he plans to meet Juliet, Stuart asks him to watch Ste Hay (Kieron Richardson), who is trying to leave Stuart's far-right extremist group, and ensure he does not leave. Sid disobeys his orders and meets Juliet, allowing Ste to leave briefly. The date ends badly as Sid is cautious about having left Ste. When Juliet returns Sid's wallet to him in front of Stuart, she unintentionally reveals that he left Ste; Stuart then beats Sid as punishment.

After Ste attempts to flee to Newcastle, he and Sami Maalik (Rishi Nair) are kidnapped by Stuart and Jonny Baxter (Ray Quinn) and taken to a cliff. Sid, realizing how far his father has gone and wanting to make amends, warns those in attendance at Sami's wedding about Stuart and Jonny's intentions and Sid subsequently accompanies Leela Lomax (Kirsty-Leigh Porter), Peri Lomax (Ruby O'Donnell) and Azim Desai (Nav Sidhu) to the cliff to save Ste and Sami. When they arrive, Jonny chases after Ste who has escaped. At the cliff's edge, Stuart accuses Sid of betrayal and as he attempts to push Ste from the cliff, Sid intervenes and pushes Stuart from the cliff, saving Ste and killing Stuart. Sid breaks down in tears and is arrested for Stuart's murder. Sami becomes his lawyer and persuades Sid to tell the truth when he tells the police that he intentionally killed Stuart, believing his life is worthless. When he returns to the village, Leela offers him a home, but he rejects her offer, claiming that he does not deserve her kindness.

Sid confesses to Juliet that he is homeless, so Juliet asks teaching assistant Sienna Blake (Anna Passey) to help Sid. She invites Sid to stay at her flat, which Sienna's sister, Liberty Savage (Jessamy Stoddart), and partner, Brody Hudson (Adam Woodward), disagree with. Sid later brings a knife into their home, creating an argument with Liberty and Brody. During the argument, Sienna returns home with Sid's stepmother, Alice (Stacy Liu), who had decided to let him live with her, but she changes her mind upon witnessing the argument. Sid admits to Sienna that he was beaten and robbed and had the knife because he was scared; Sienna relates to Sid and decides to foster him. When Liberty and Brody refuse to accept Sid, he leaves the flat. When Juliet cancels a date with Sid, he begins feeling upset and unloved, and asks drug dealer Liam Donovan (Jude Monk McGowan) for drugs. Liam initially refuses, but eventually relents and the drugs later make Sid ill. Believing Sid is a bad influence, Juliet's brother, James Nightingale (Gregory Finnegan), bans Juliet from seeing him and, Sid later sneaks Juliet out of school, they are caught by Juliet's brother Romeo Quinn (Owen Warner), who warns Sid to stay away from Juliet. Sid and Juliet kiss and have sex on Christmas Eve, and later that night, Leela asks Sid if she can foster him; he accepts and moves into her house. Sid then meets with his cousin, Jordan Price (Connor Calland), who offers him drugs. Jordan later reveals that he is involved in a county lines drug trafficking operation, and blackmails both Sid and Juliet into delivering and selling drugs. In order to protect him, Juliet takes charge of the selling so that Sid is not involved. The pair break up when Juliet comes out to Sid, saying that she is a lesbian and has romantic feelings for Peri, which greatly upsets Sid though the two remain close friends.

When the school is searched for drugs, Sid hides Juliet's stash in his locker so she isn't incriminated, which causes him to be late for his music exam. The police find Sid's drugs and Jordan forces him to tell Sally they were for personal use and she expels him. Angry and hoping to save Juliet from the operation, Sid reports Jordan to the police, who promises to ruin Sid's life when he learns of his cousin's betrayal. In order to distract his mind from his breakup with Juliet and Jordan, Sid takes ketamine, and collapses on the street, where a distracted Peri drives over his leg. Sid is distraught upon waking up in hospital when Misbah Maalik (Harvey Virdi) informs his that his leg later has to be amputated in order to prevent infection. He initially refuses the surgery and finds it difficult to come to terms with what has happened to him though, with emotional support from Ste, Peri and Juliet, he eventually agrees to sign the consent form.

After a few weeks at a rehab centre, Sid returns to the village but struggles to adjust to his new life as a disabled person, leading him to seek advice from Courtney Campbell (Amy Conachan). As he continues physiotherapy, he is comforted by Ste, Leela, Peri and Juliet and goes on to start a band with Brooke Hathaway (Tylan Grant) and Imran Maalik (Ijaz Rana) who ask for his help when they are hired to play at the wedding of Tom Cunningham (Ellis Hollins) and Yasmine Maalik (Haiesha Mistry). As the drug trafficking intensifies, Jordan's boss Victor Brothers (Benjamin O'Mahony) orders Jordan to murder Sid and Juliet, who tried to record Victor so that she could blackmail him and get herself and Sid out of the operation. Jordan meets Sid and Juliet in the café and promises to stand up to Victor, despite knowing that Victor will kill him in retaliation. Sid says a tearful goodbye but Jordan is later accidentally murdered by Ella Richardson (Erin Palmer), while Juliet is subsequently arrested for her role in the operation. Ste helps Sid to grieve for Jordan and he becomes hell-bent on doing whatever it takes to get Juliet out of prison by going after Victor but he is talked down by Ste and James. Sid resumes drug dealing with Victor in order to gather enough information to incriminate him. However, Oliver Morgan (Gabriel Clark) informs Victor of Sid's intentions, resulting in Victor cornering Sid in the car park of The Dog in the Pond and stabbing him. Sid is revealed to be alive two weeks later after surviving the attack and working with Ste to help bring Victor down.

== Reception ==
For his portrayal of Sid, Price was nominated within the Serial Drama Performance at the National Television Awards. He was also nominated for Best Actor at the 2021 Inside Soap Awards, Favourite Soap Star at the 2021 TVTimes Awards and Best Soap Performance at the 2021 I Talk Telly Awards.
