= List of Hollyoaks characters introduced in 2019 =

Hollyoaks is a British television soap opera that was first broadcast on 23 October 1995. The following is a list of characters introduced in 2019, by order of first appearance. All characters were introduced by executive producer, Bryan Kirkwood. The first character to be introduced is Mitchell Deveraux (Imran Adams), the son of Martine Deveraux (Kéllé Bryan). Stuart Sumner (Chris Simmons), Shahid Shirani (Alex Williams) and Amir Shirani (Naveed Choudhry) first appear in February, March and April, respectively, as part of the soap's far-right extremism story. Babs Drinkwell (Samantha Mesagno), the mother of Lily Drinkwell (Lauren McQueen), also appears in April. Sid Sumner (Billy Price), the son of Stuart, joins as a guest character in May, before being promoted to the regular cast in November. Sadie Cressington (Alexa Lee), the former girlfriend of Harry Thompson (Parry Glasspool), is also introduced in May. The following month features the introduction of Levi Rochester (Cerith Flinn), a love interest for Scott Drinkwell (Ross Adams), and the appearance of Mr Reynolds (Jack Reynolds). Azim Desai (Nav Sidhu), the half-brother of Sami Maalik (Rishi Nair), debuts in September, and during October, D.S. Naomi Cohen (Ariana Fraval), the detective sergeant investigating Harry's murder, and builder Woody Turner (Jake Quickenden) join the show. Married couple Toby Faroe (Bobby Gordon) and Celeste Faroe (Andrea Ali) are introduced in November, while Jordan Price (Connor Calland) is the final character to debut in the year, arriving in December. Additionally, multiple other characters appear throughout the year.

== Mitchell Deveraux ==
Mitchell Deveraux
- Hollyoaks character
- Portrayed by: Imran Adams
- Duration: 2019–2020
- First appearance: Episode 5100; 8 February 2019
- Last appearance: Episode 5476; 24 November 2020
- Introduced by: Bryan Kirkwood
In-universe information
- Occupation: Trainee doctor Stripper
- Father: Felix Westwood
- Mother: Martine Deveraux
- Brothers: Toby Faroe
- Sisters: Celeste Faroe
- Half-brothers: DeMarcus Westwood
- Husband: Scott Drinkwell (2020–2021)
- Grandfathers: Walter Deveraux
- Grandmothers: Gloria Deveraux
- Aunts: Simone Loveday; Melanie Deveraux
- First cousins: Lisa Loveday; Zack Loveday

Mitchell Drinkwell-Deveraux (also Deveraux), portrayed by Imran Adams, first appears in episode 5100, broadcast on 8 February 2019. The character and Adams' casting details were announced on 16 December 2018. Mitchell is introduced as the son of established character Martine Deveraux (Kéllé Bryan). He is billed as "the popular new guy in town" who is levelheaded in his job as a trainee doctor. Despite having had a "strict upbringing", Mitchell is gentle and friendly. Adams has expressed his joy at joining the cast of Hollyoaks stating that he is "proud and grateful" to be a cast member. He added that it is a challenging job, which he described as "a rollercoaster of a ride" and "Acting Athletics".

Mitchell's introduction sees the character move into his cousin, Lisa Loveday's (Rachel Adedeji), flat with Martine and his grandfather, Walter Deveraux (Trevor A. Toussaint), annoying Lisa. Daniel Kilkelly of entertainment website Digital Spy reported that Mitchell would begin a relationship with a member of the McQueen family, later confirmed to be Cleo McQueen (Nadine Mulkerrin). Mitchell appears as a stripper at a themed night in The Dog in the Pond public house, organised by Cleo's grandmother, Nana McQueen (Diane Langton); this leads to him asking Cleo on a date.

Producers developed the character by introducing his long-lost siblings, Toby Faroe (Bobby Gordon) and Celeste Faroe (Andrea Ali) in November 2019. In episodes broadcast in September 2019, it emerges that Mitchell has a twin brother, and in the soap's 2019 Christmas episodes, Toby is revealed to be his twin brother. Adams thought that Mitchell would be "quite emotional and confused" if he knew Toby's identity, but thought his "compassionate" nature would make him want to build a relationship with Toby. Toby resents Martine and Mitchell for the former's decision to keep Mitchell and not Toby. Gordon said that Toby and Celeste have "ulterior motives", but did not believe that they were villains. Writers developed the twist further by revealing that Celeste is also the sister of Toby and Mitchell, making them triplets. On 21 August 2020, it was announced that Adams would leave Hollyoaks at the end of his contract. The character departs in episode 5476, broadcast on 24 November 2020. His exit story sees him blackmailed into leaving the village by Toby and Celeste.

== Stuart Sumner ==
Stuart Sumner
- Hollyoaks character
- Portrayed by: Chris Simmons
- First appearance: Episode 5109; 21 February 2019
- Last appearance: Episode 5301; 18 November 2019
- Introduced by: Bryan Kirkwood
In-universe information
- Wife: Alice
- Sons: Sid Sumner; Aiden
- Daughters: Violet
- Nephews: Jordan Price

Stuart Sumner, portrayed by Chris Simmons, first appears in episode 5109, broadcast on 21 February 2019. Simmons announced his casting on Twitter on 2 January 2019, but soon deleted the tweet, which expressed his excitement about joining the cast. The character and further details were announced on 20 February 2019, prior to Stuart's introduction. Stuart is connected with The Teahouse café and shares scenes with Ste Hay (Kieron Richardson). Simmons expressed his delight at his casting and believed that his character would "challenge and stretch" him.

The character is at the focus of a year-long far-right extremism story, where he grooms Ste into joining his far-right group using "psychological manipulation" to "immerse him in their anti-Islamist ideology". Hollyoaks worked with Home Office-related organisations, Prevent and ExitUK, to produce the story and raise awareness for the subject. Simmons described the story as "dark" and said that Stuart is using "a disguise of respectability" and demonstrating how he is "friendly and good with Ste's children". The actor called Stuart "very clever and charismatic" and explained that he "genuinely believes what he believes". The character was killed off in an extended episode of the soap, episode 5301, broadcast on 18 November 2019, marking Simmons' final appearance.

Keen to portray himself as the respectable owner of the Teahouse, Stuart was actually the leader of a dangerous Far Right Organisation with the intention of grooming vulnerable young men into fostering Islamophobic beliefs. Along with his right-hand man, Jonny Baxter (Ray Quinn), Stuart successfully groomed Ste over the course of a year and fuelled his hatred of Maalik family. Once Stuart had isolated Ste from the Lomaxes, he planned to detonate an explosive device in a Muslim community centre - but it accidentally detonated in the Maaliks' back garden, causing Yasmine Maalik (Haiesha Mistry) to go deaf. After that, Stuart began to realise that Ste no longer believed in the Far Right cause and became suspicious of him. Although Stuart tried to keep Ste locked in the house, his son, Sid Sumner (Billy Price) reluctantly let Ste out to see Leela Lomax (Kirsty-Leigh Porter) and Peri Lomax (Ruby O'Donnell). Realising Ste could no longer be trusted, Stuart and Jonny abducted Ste and Sami Maalik (Rishi Nair) and drove them to the clifftops - where he planned to kill them both. However, the police arrived and Sid pushed Stuart to his death to save Ste's life.

== Shahid Shirani ==
Shahid Shirani, portrayed by Alex Williams, first appears in episode 5124, broadcast on 14 March 2019. The character and Williams' casting details were announced on 5 March 2019. Shahid is introduced as part of a far-right extremism story when he becomes the victim of a racist attack from a gang including Stuart Sumner (Chris Simmons), Jonny Baxter (Ray Quinn) and Ste Hay (Kieron Richardson). He first appears during a special episode focusing on the story, before returning a month later. Following his return, Shahid's brother, Amir Shirani (Naveed Choudhry), is introduced as another victim to the gang. Williams expressed his excitement at joining the soap and featuring in the story alongside Richardson and Quinn. He called his first scenes "hard-hitting".

== Babs Drinkwell ==
Babs Drinkwell (credited as Babs), portrayed by Samantha Mesagno, appears in episode 5144, broadcast on 11 April 2019. The character was first referenced in January 2017 following the introduction of her daughter Lily Drinkwell (Lauren McQueen). Details about the character's appearance were announced on 1 April 2019. Babs is created as Lily's mother and the sister of Diane Hutchinson (Alex Fletcher). Her backstory states that she was terminally ill and died, which resulted in Lily's arrival in the village. McQueen explained that Babs' illness "forced [Lily] to grow up before her time". The character appears in flashback scenes set in 2006 as Lily, in the present day, reminisces about her childhood while dying from sepsis.

== Amir Shirani ==
Amir Shirani, portrayed by Naveed Choudhry, first appears in episode 5155, broadcast on 26 April 2019. The concept of the character was announced on 15 April 2019, while the character and Choudhry's casting details were announced on 18 April 2019. Amir is introduced as the brother of Shahid Shirani (Alex Williams) who appears as part of a far-right extremism story. Amir and Shahid co-own a takeaway food business and when Amir delivers food to a far-right gang, including Stuart Sumner (Chris Simmons), Jonny Baxter (Ray Quinn) and Ste Hay (Kieron Richardson), they subject him to a racist attack. Prior to this, they had also attacked Shahid. Choudhry expressed his delight at appearing in the soap and said that he felt at ease working with the cast and crew. On the extremism plot, he commented, "I've enjoyed getting my teeth into the challenging storyline – the subject matter is very relevant and I'm keen to see the response when it airs." Choudhry appears in a guest stint, and makes his final appearance in episode 5163, broadcast on 8 May 2019.

== Sid Sumner ==
Sid Sumner, portrayed by Billy Price, first appears in episode 5164, broadcast on 9 May 2019. The character was announced on 30 April 2019. Sid is introduced as the son of Stuart Sumner (Chris Simmons) and a new student at Hollyoaks High School. He features in the soap's far-right extremism story when he is racially abusive to fellow student Imran Maalik (Ijaz Rana) and falsely reports Imran as a terror threat. He also launches a prejudiced attack on Scott Drinkwell (Ross Adams) while he is dressed in drag. Price is initially contracted in a guest role, before being promoted to a regular character in October 2019. Sid returns as a regular during the following month and producers then plotted the character in the show's year-long county lines drug trafficking storyline.

== Sadie Cressington ==
Sadie Cressington
- Hollyoaks character
- Portrayed by: Alexa Lee
- First appearance: Episode 5179; 30 May 2019
- Last appearance: Episode 5218; 24 July 2019
- Introduced by: Bryan Kirkwood
In-universe information
- Sons: Isaac Thompson

Sadie Cressington, portrayed by Alexa Lee, first appears in episode 5179, broadcast on 30 May 2019. The character and Lee's casting details were announced on 21 May 2019. Sadie is introduced as the former girlfriend of Harry Thompson (Parry Glasspool). She is his alibi for the night that Grace Black (Tamara Wall) was run over in a stolen car, as the police suspect him for the crime. Glasspool explained that Sadie is a "former fling" who "wants something" from Harry. He added that Sadie is "the last thing he needs". Lee expressed her joy at joining the soap, calling the experience an "absolute pleasure and privilege". She enjoyed filming with Glasspool and Finnegan and looked forward to exploring the character further. The actress later reinforced that she was enjoying working with Glasspool and Finnegan, opining that she had "made friends for life".

When Harry explains the situation to his boyfriend, lawyer James Nightingale (Gregory Finnegan), he is surprised to discover that Harry's former partner is a woman. A show spokesperson confirmed that Harry and James would try to persuade Sadie to give Harry an alibi. Sadie pressures Harry into meeting her and paying her, which Harry tries to keep secret. Glasspool said that Harry wants Sadie "out of [his] life". Producers kept the reason for Harry paying Sadie out of advanced spoilers, and in the episode, it emerges that Sadie is pregnant with Harry's child. Glasspool explained that Sadie wants money because her family have ejected her from their home, but she is also hoping that Harry will "step up, be a dad and be in the kid's life". Sadie leaves the village when Liam Donovan (Jude Monk McGowan) pays her to leave and not be Harry's alibi.

Sadie returns to the village after receiving a call informing her that Harry is dying, but when she arrives, she discovers Harry is well. Lee told Alice Penwill of Inside Soap that Sadie is "torn whether to stay or go". Sadie admits to James that she was paid off, which helps his case for proving Harry innocent. When asked by Penwill, Lee said that she thought Sadie would make a good friend for Mercedes McQueen (Jennifer Metcalfe) or Peri Lomax (Ruby O'Donnell) due to their similar personalities and experiences. On another visit to the village, Sadie goes into labour with Harry's son. Harry's father Tony Hutchinson (Nick Pickard) and Breda McQueen (Moya Brady) to help, and gives birth to a boy, Isaac. Glasspool pointed out that the experience "happens so fast" and makes Harry reconsider his stance on Sadie and the baby, deciding to be involved in their lives. He added that Harry believes that there is "no point holding a grudge against Sadie". The character makes her final appearance in episode 5218, broadcast on 24 July 2019.

== Levi Rochester ==
Levi Rochester
- Hollyoaks character
- Portrayed by: Cerith Flinn
- First appearance: Episode 5190; 14 June 2019
- Last appearance: Episode 5223; 31 July 2019
- Introduced by: Bryan Kirkwood
In-universe information
- Occupation: Specialist doctor

Levi Rochester, portrayed by Cerith Flinn, first appears in episode 5190, broadcast on 14 June 2019. The character and Flinn's casting details were announced on 7 June 2019. Levi is introduced as a specialist doctor in Maxine Minniver's (Nikki Sanderson) Munchausen's syndrome storyline. The character is billed as "a no-nonsense doctor" with a high patient success rate. Flinn expressed his enjoyment at filming on the soap. Levi arrives to help to diagnose Maxine after seeing her appear on daytime television show This Morning to discuss her undiagnosed condition. Flinn explained that he arrives to "solve a mystery", but soon realises that Maxine is faking her condition. The actor told Inside Soap's Sarah Ellis that Levi would "leave no stone unturned" in his journey to diagnose Maxine. He is prepared to question Maxine and run numerous tests on her. The actor noted, "Maxine thinks that she can outwit Levi, but he's at the top of his game." A show spokesperson teased that as Maxine tries to "pull the wool over everyone's eyes", she may struggle with Levi.

Levi is also introduced as a love interest for Scott Drinkwell (Ross Adams), who has struggled finding love. Their romance is billed as a "heartwarming romantic connection" which would be tested. Flinn liked starring opposite Adams, who he called "an absolute pleasure" and "a pure gentleman". The characters first meet while Scott is performing as a drag artist in The Dog in the Pond public house, which Levi's friend Mitchell Deveraux (Imran Adams) takes him to see. Levi dislikes drag acts and views them as "an offence to gay people", but he does not recognise Scott as he is not wearing his glasses at the show. The following day, Levi notices Scott, who is not wearing drag, since he is wearing his glasses and is attracted to him. Flinn thought that the characters were "a good match" for each other as they were very different people professionally. He added that this brings the pair "closer together". Adams also liked the pairing and received a positive response about the relationship from the audience. He told Ellis (Inside Soap) that the relationship would be short-term, and the story ends when Levi sees Scott in drag and ends their relationship, unable to "get past the drag aspect". This marks the character's departure from the series, making his final appearance in episode 5223, broadcast on 31 July 2019.

== Mr Reynolds ==
Mr Reynolds, portrayed by Jack Reynolds, appears in episode 5191, broadcast on 17 June 2019. The character is a guest role and appears in a single scene. Reynolds' appearance was announced on 8 April 2019 and he filmed his appearance on the same day. In his appearance, Reynolds' character approaches Maxine Minniver (Nikki Sanderson) and offers her "some words of comfort and sage wisdom". Like Reynolds, the character is 107-years-old. His appearance on Hollyoaks also marked Reynolds' first acting role in 100 years. He expressed his pride at starring on the soap and called the experience "wonderful". On-set, Reynolds received support from Sanderson, Adam Rickitt (Kyle Kelly) and Jacob Roberts (Damon Kinsella). The appearance marks a world record for being the "oldest person to perform as a supporting artist on a TV show". The record is Reynolds' fourth world record in as many years.

== Azim Desai ==
Azim Desai
- Hollyoaks character
- Portrayed by: Nav Sidhu
- Duration: 2019–2020
- First appearance: Episode 5255; 13 September 2019
- Last appearance: Episode 5359; 6 February 2020
- Introduced by: Bryan Kirkwood
In-universe information
- Occupation: Events planner
- Mother: Sheeba Desai
- Half-brothers: Sami Maalik

Azim Desai, portrayed by Nav Sidhu, first appears in episode 5255, broadcast on 13 September 2019. The character was first referenced in August 2019, but the character's introduction and Sidhu's casting details were announced on 5 September 2019. Azim is introduced as the half-brother of Sami Maalik (Rishi Nair), although Johnathon Hughes of the Radio Times reported that Azim is embedded within the entire Maalik family. The character is billed as "flamboyant", "lively" and "fun-loving", while Sidhu described the character as fun, friendly, intelligent and "a fixer". Azim is an event planner who decides to host an engagement party for Sami and his fiancée, Sinead Shelby (Stephanie Davis), after they announce their engagement. The character's backstory states that he has been living in Australia working for "the rich and famous". Azim is single and Sidhu teased that he could be given a love interest. Sidhu liked Azim's job and enjoyed working with the Maalik family, feeling pleased to be introduced as part of "an established family". For his audition, Sidhu performed a screen test with Nair, which made him feel at ease as he knew Nair from when he appeared in Sidhu's 2016 short film. Nair was surprised to learn that Sami has a brother, but liked the decision and thought Amir's creation had "changed the family dynamic". He also liked that Sami had another character that is of a similar age. The actor added that he enjoyed working with Sidhu, who he deemed a good casting as they look alike.

The character's introduction occurs during a week of episodes focusing on the show's far-right extremism story, which involves the Maalik family's conflict with a far-right activist gang. Bryan Kirkwood, the show's executive producer, said that the episodes would have an effect on the family "forever". Writers incorporated Azim into the story when Ste Hay (Kieron Richardson), who has been groomed into joining the group, reaches out to him for help. Sidhu explained that Azim recognises Ste's "cry for help" because he witnessed a friend experience a similar situation to Ste, but was unable to help him. He added that Ste is "a young man offering an olive branch needing a way out", something which Azim resonates with. Azim is conflicted on whether to help Ste as he is aware of what the organisation has done to the Maalik family. Sidhu said that the opportunity to have "one less extremist in the mix" persuades Azim to help Ste. When Azim meets Ste face-to-face for the first time, he feels more confident that Ste is being honest. They share a kiss and Sidhu said the pair would make "an interesting cocktail". Show scriptwriter Jonathan Larkin named the pairing as a potential new couple, although the romance was cut short by Richardson leaving the soap.

Writers then plotted Azim in Mitchell Deveraux's (Imran Adams) coming out story and his relationship with Scott Drinkwell (Ross Adams). When Mitchell feels unable to come out as gay, Scott struggles to be in a relationship with him and grows close with Azim. Imran Adams explained that Scott sees characteristics in Azim that he wants from Mitchell: "to be proud and openly gay, and someone who doesn't have to hide." While on a date, Scott and Mitchell are spotted by Azim, causing Mitchell to hide their relationship again. Azim and Scott are then paired romantically and begin dating. Ross Adams told Sarah Ellis, writing for Inside Soap, that unlike Mitchell, Azim accepts Scott and is "proud to be seen with him", something which is important to Scott. He added that Azim and Scott share similar qualities and are "comfortable with themselves", something which the actor thought made them a good pairing.

Azim is offered a new job in London and asks Scott to leave with him, which he agrees to do. Believing his romance with Mitchell to be over, Scott decides that he should "make a go of things" with Azim. Azim has an argument with Mitchell and afterwards, Scott is supportive of Azim but defends Mitchell. Ross Adams pointed out that this "upsets Azim a little bit". After Mitchell openly admits his love for Scott, he ends his relationship with Azim. On the decision, Ross Adams said that although Azim pleases Scott, he does not "ignite that fire that Mitchell does". The actor opined that Azim would be a sensible choice for a relationship as he has "less baggage" than Mitchell. A poll ran by Inside Soap revealed that 55% of readers wanted Scott to pursue a relationship with Azim. The character departs from the series in episode 5359, broadcast on 6 February 2020, and it was confirmed on 11 February that Sidhu had completed filming with the show and would not return.

== DS Naomi Cohen ==
DS Naomi Cohen
- Hollyoaks character
- Portrayed by: Ariana Fraval
- Duration: 2019–2023
- First appearance: Episode 5269; 3 October 2019
- Last appearance: Episode 6041; 6 February 2023
- Introduced by: Bryan Kirkwood
In-universe information
- Other names: Naomi Cohen
- Occupation: Detective sergeant

DS Naomi Cohen, portrayed by Ariana Fraval, first appears in episode 5269, broadcast on 3 October 2019. Fraval's casting was announced by her agent on 23 August 2019, while details about the character were announced on 3 October 2019. D.S. Cohen is introduced as a detective sergeant who is investigating the murder of Harry Thompson (Parry Glasspool). Johnathon Hughes of the Radio Times confirmed that the character would appear on a recurring guest basis, and writers plotted her into the show's "Who Shot Mercedes?" plot, which sees Mercedes McQueen (Jennifer Metcalfe) shot in The Loft nightclub. Fraval stars opposite her husband, actor Gregory Finnegan, who portrays Harry's boyfriend, James Nightingale, and her first scenes on the soap were with him. Finnegan enjoyed working with Fraval, but noted that her casting complicated their childcare arrangements. He later praised her work on the show in a press interview, commenting, "she has really hit the ground running now and knows everyone so feels a lot more comfortable".

D.S. Cohen arrives to take James Nightingale to identify the body of Harry Thompson. When James positively identifies Harry's body, she informs Harry's stepmother, Diane Hutchinson (Alex Fletcher), about his death. She later investigates an assault on Joel Dexter (Rory Douglas-Speed), who was attacked by Liam Donovan (Jude Monk McGowan). When Cindy Cunningham (Stephanie Waring) reports having witnessed Liam follow Joel into an alleyway, D.S. Cohen arrests Liam. However, after Joel is threatened, he informs D.S. Cohen that a random person attacked him and it was not Liam. She later informs Diane about the release of Harry's body. When Diane reports Mercedes for Harry's murder, D.S. Cohen arrives to arrest her, but cannot find her; Mercedes' husband, Sylver McQueen (David Tag), refuses to reveal Mercedes' location. James argues with D.S. Cohen about not arresting Mercedes.

D.S. Cohen questions Liam about the disappearance of Mercedes, but they are stopped when Mercedes' cousin, Goldie McQueen (Chelsee Healey), discovers her unconscious body in The Loft nightclub, having been shot. She then questions Liam about the lack of CCTV footage in The Loft during the shooting. During the following day, she collects alibis from Sylver, Liam and Grace Black (Tamara Wall). After receiving a tip-off from Liam, she searches The Dog in the Pond public house for a gun, which Grace is able to hide. Sylver warns D.S. Cohen that Liam could have shot Mercedes, so when the police find the gun in Liam's car, she arrests him. She prepares to charge Liam for the shooting until James, his lawyer, intervenes and has the charges dropped. D.S. Cohen interviews Sid Sumner (Billy Price) for the murder of his father, Stuart Sumner (Chris Simmons), after he pushes him from a cliff; she drops the charges when witness statements state Sid acted in self-defence. When Mercedes awakens from her coma and tells D.S. Cohen that Sylver shot her, she arrests him, and charges him for attempted murder. When blood is discovered at the shooting crime scene, Diane confesses to D.S. Cohen that it belongs to her. Diane also presents her with CCTV footage of her kissing Edward Hutchinson (Joe McGann) as her alibi, which also confirms the time of the shooting. Later, Mercedes informs D.S. Cohen that she is retracting her statement about Sylver shooting her.

After Breda McQueen (Moya Brady), who is a serial killer, anonymously hands in a written confession, D.S. Cohen runs forensics on the confession and assesses that Mercedes is the serial killer, so arrests her and clashes with Goldie. She then orders a search of Mercedes' home, but fails to find any evidence that could convict her. After a hostage situation at Breda's pig farm, where Breda is exposed as the serial killer (see Hollyoaks Later (2020 special)), D.S. Cohen tries to ask Mercedes for her version of events, but she is rebuffed. Following the death of Jesse Donovan (Luke Jerdy), D.S. Cohen returns his personal items to his wife, Courtney Campbell (Amy Conachan), and explains to his siblings, Grace and Liam, that Jesse died from alcohol poisoning. After reviewing the footage of Jesse drinking, she decides not to launch an investigation into his death. D.S. Cohen later arrests Mitchell Deveraux (Imran Adams) for homophobic abuse against Azim Desai (Nav Sidhu), but releases him when Azim drops the charges. Tony Hutchinson (Nick Pickard), who was Breda's prisoner for months and is suffering with post-traumatic stress disorder as a result, asks D.S. Cohen about Breda's body; she reveals that it was mostly burnt, fueling his paranoia that Breda has returned. After learning the whereabouts of Warren Fox (Jamie Lomas), who is wanted by the police, D.S. Cohen arrests him, but soon releases him when Brody Hudson (Adam Woodward) confirms Warren's version of events. She later arrests Warren after witnessing him assault Liam. Acting as Warren's lawyer, James confronts D.S. Cohen about the arrest and has him released. When Felix Westwood (Richard Blackwood) is attacked, D.S. Cohen questions his children, Mitchell, Toby Faroe (Bobby Gordon) and Celeste Faroe (Andrea Ali). Celeste lies that Mitchell was responsible for the attack, so D.S. Cohen arrests him. She then questions Mitchell and later, his boyfriend, Scott Drinkwell (Ross Adams).

== Edward Hutchinson ==
Edward Hutchinson
- Hollyoaks character
- Portrayed by: Joe McGann
- Duration: 2019–2020
- First appearance: Episode 5281; 21 October 2019
- Last appearance: Episode 5493/5494; 23 December 2020
- Introduced by: Bryan Kirkwood
- Spin-off appearances: Hollyoaks Later (2020)
In-universe information
- Other names: Brian Edward Hutchinson
- Occupation: Neurosurgeon
- Wife: Victoria Hutchinson (backstory); Charlotte Hutchinson (backstory)
- Sons: Tony Hutchinson; Dominic Reilly; Eric Foster
- Daughters: Verity Hutchinson; Eva Hutchinson
- Grandsons: Beau Ramsey; Harry Thompson; Anthony Hutchinson; Ro Hutchinson
- Granddaughters: Dee Dee Hutchinson (adoptive); Eva Hutchinson (adoptive)

Edward Hutchinson, portrayed by Joe McGann, first appears in episode 5281, broadcast on 21 October 2019. The character was referenced during the early years of the show as Brian Hutchinson, while details about the character's introduction and McGann's casting were announced on 20 May 2019. Edward is introduced as the estranged father of established character Tony Hutchinson (Nick Pickard). The character is billed as "a highly manipulative and narcissistic surgeon", which contrasts Tony's characterisation. McGann joked that his mother would be "really proud" of his surgeon status. The actor, who was invited to the role, expressed his excitement at joining the soap. Bryan Kirkwood, the show's executive producer, explained that Edward is introduced to explore his relationship with Tony, in the build-up to the show's anniversary. He expressed his delight at hiring an actor of McGann's "calibre", and commented, "we can't wait to see the phenomenal Joe McGann bring this huge character to life." Pickard also expressed his delight at McGann's casting and liked that producers had decided to expand Tony's family. He also warned that Edward would "ruffle a few feathers". Rishma Dosani of the Metro was excited about Edward's introduction.

The character's backstory and his absence in Tony's life is explored following his introduction. His backstory states that after Edward left Tony, he had a breakdown and "reinvented himself", now calling himself by his middle name. In his absence, Edward returned to the medical profession and Kirkwood pointed out that he became "a very high-status, very strident leading man". Producers devised Edward as the soap's new supervillain character, a trait which has previously been occupied by Doctor Browning (Joseph Thompson) and Lindsey Butterfield (Sophie Austin). Kirkwood deemed the character "a force to be reckoned with", and explained that Edward would be a "different kind of villain" than Browning and Lindsey and called him "a very interesting villain and very complex". A show spokesperson later confirmed that Edward would become "one of the biggest villains the show has seen". In September 2019, it was confirmed that Edward's daughter would be introduced to the soap. She is billed as similarly villainous than Edward and a show spokesperson said that family would create an "exciting, fresh dynamic for Tony". Eva O'Hara was later cast as Edward's daughter, Verity Hutchinson. Pickard expressed his excitement to work with his new on-screen family.

In December 2020, it was announced that McGann had filmed his final scenes as Edward, and that his "explosive" exit would be aired later that month. It was stated that "he goes out with a bang", and explained his exit by saying "a character like that can only have a certain shelf life and fans are now ready for his comeuppance."

== Woody Turner ==
Woody Turner, portrayed by Jake Quickenden, first appears in episode 5284, broadcast on 24 October 2019. The concept of the character and Quickenden's casting details were announced on 27 July 2019, while further details about the character were announced on 9 August 2019. Quickenden previously expressed his interest in a role on the soap in March 2018. Woody is introduced as a "hunky" builder who is involved in the show's annual stunt. He is described as "a liability" and "a cheeky chap". The character appears in a guest stint and Quickenden began filming on 7 August 2019. Quickenden was invited by producers to star in the soap and appears opposite Cindy Cunningham actress Stephanie Waring, who he starred with in reality TV competition Dancing on Ice. The actor felt at ease on-set because he was working with Waring. He also expressed an interest in reprising the role as a regular cast member. The character makes his final appearance in episode 5289, broadcast on 31 October 2019.

== Toby Faroe ==
Toby Faroe
- Hollyoaks character
- Portrayed by: Bobby Gordon; T'Jai Adu-Yeboah (2020 flashback); Caelan Edie (2020 flashback)
- Duration: 2019−2022
- First appearance: Episode 5309; 28 November 2019
- Last appearance: Episode 5785; 11 February 2022
- Introduced by: Bryan Kirkwood
In-universe information
- Occupation: Music producer
- Father: Felix Westwood
- Mother: Martine Deveraux
- Brothers: Mitchell Deveraux
- Sisters: Celeste Faroe
- Half-brothers: DeMarcus Westwood
- Grandfathers: Walter Deveraux
- Grandmothers: Gloria Deveraux
- Aunts: Simone Loveday
- First cousins: Lisa Loveday

Toby Faroe, portrayed by Bobby Gordon, first appears in episode 5309, broadcast on 28 November 2019. The character and Gordon's casting details were announced on 22 November 2019. Toby is introduced alongside his "wife", Celeste Faroe (Andrea Ali), as they move in next to Darren Osborne (Ashley Taylor Dawson) and Mandy Morgan (Sarah Jayne Dunn), who they befriend. Toby is a music producer and he and Celeste are billed as mysterious, "manipulative" and "devious". Toby soon tries helping hair salon owner Jesse Donovan (Luke Jerdy) by offering to arrange for one of his artists to promote his salon, but Toby does not do this. Gordon secured the role in August 2019, and he expressed his delight at joining the show's cast after struggling to find employment for a year. Johnathon Hughes of the Radio Times dubbed Toby and Celeste as mysterious, commenting, "Buckets of intrigue surrounded the recent arrival of Toby Faroe (Bobby Gordon) and his wife Celeste Faroe (Andrea Ali)".

Producers created Toby as the twin brother of Mitchell Deveraux (Imran Adams) and son of Martine Deveraux (Kéllé Bryan), but his identity was not revealed until the soap's 2019 Christmas episodes. The twist was first teased prior to Toby's introduction, in September 2019, when it emerged that Mitchell has a twin brother. Having already kept his casting a secret, Gordon found it easier to keep the secret about Toby's parentage. Toby resents Martine and Mitchell for the former's decision to keep Mitchell and not Toby. Gordon said that Toby and Celeste have "ulterior motives", but did not believe that they were villains. He added that Toby has needed Celeste to "function" as she "protects him and allows him to be himself". Writers developed the twist further by revealing that Celeste is also the sister of Toby and Mitchell, making them triplets. Ali explained that Toby and Celeste have a close relationship and that Celeste relies on Toby. As part of the story, "disturbing" flashbacks depict Toby and Celeste's upbringing, where they were brought up in a social experiment. In the flashbacks, T'Jai Adu-Yeboah portrayed Toby as a teenager, while Caelan Edie portrayed a younger Toby.

In February 2022, in previously unannounced scenes, Gordon made his final appearance as Toby. His final scenes see him arrested for the murder of his cousin Lisa Loveday (Rachel Adedeji) after being reported by his father, Felix Westwood (Richard Blackwood).

== Celeste Faroe ==
Celeste Faroe
- Hollyoaks character
- Portrayed by: Andrea Ali; Murnaya Martin (2020 flashback); Leah Mondesir-Simmonds (2020 flashback)
- Duration: 2019–2022
- First appearance: Episode 5309; 28 November 2019
- Last appearance: Episode 5762/5763; 12 January 2022
- Introduced by: Bryan Kirkwood
In-universe information
- Occupation: Modeling agent
- Father: Felix Westwood
- Mother: Martine Deveraux
- Brothers: Mitchell Deveraux; Toby Faroe
- Half-brothers: DeMarcus Westwood
- Grandfathers: Walter Deveraux
- Aunts: Simone Loveday
- First cousins: Lisa Loveday

Celeste Faroe, portrayed by Andrea Ali, first appears in episode 5309, broadcast on 28 November 2019. The character and Ali's casting details were announced on 22 November 2019. Celeste is introduced alongside her "husband", Toby Faroe (Bobby Gordon), as they move in next to Darren Osborne (Ashley Taylor Dawson) and Mandy Morgan (Sarah Jayne Dunn), who they befriend. Celeste is a modelling agent and she and Toby are billed as mysterious, "manipulative" and "devious". Additionally, Celeste is described as glamorous, which attracts Mandy to her. Ali expressed her delight at joining the show's cast, calling it "one [of] the most amazing experiences". Johnathon Hughes of the Radio Times dubbed Toby and Celeste as mysterious, commenting, "Buckets of intrigue surrounded the recent arrival of Toby Faroe (Bobby Gordon) and his wife Celeste Faroe (Andrea Ali)".

Producers created Celeste as the sister to Toby and Mitchell Deveraux (Imran Adams), making them triplets, and the daughter of Martine Deveraux (Kéllé Bryan), but her identity was not revealed until March 2020. Ali struggled to keep the secret, especially since she found viewers would "pick up on things very quickly". The story began in September 2019 when it emerged that Mitchell has a twin brother, and continued in the soap's 2019 Christmas episode when Toby is revealed to be the twin brother. Gordon said that Celeste and Toby have "ulterior motives", but did not believe that they were villains. He added that Toby has needed Celeste to "function" as she "protects him and allows him to be himself". Ali explained that Toby and Celeste have a close relationship and that Celeste relies on Toby. As part of the story, "disturbing" flashbacks depict Celeste and Toby's upbringing, where they were brought up in a social experiment. In the flashbacks, Murnaya Martin portrayed Celeste as a teenager, while Leah Mondesir-Simmonds portrayed a younger Celeste. Celeste was killed-off as part of the "Time Out" week on 12 January 2022.

== Jordan Price ==
Jordan Price
- Hollyoaks character
- Portrayed by: Connor Calland
- Duration: 2019–2020
- First appearance: Episode 5329; 30 December 2019
- Last appearance: Episode 5498; 30 December 2020
- Introduced by: Bryan Kirkwood
In-universe information
- Occupation: Drug dealer
- Uncles: Stuart Sumner
- First cousins: Sid Sumner

Jordan Price, portrayed by Connor Calland, first appears in episode 5329, broadcast on 30 December 2019. The character and Calland's casting details were announced on 10 December 2019. Jordan is introduced as the cousin of established character Sid Sumner (Billy Price). He is billed as a "confident, chaotic and unpredictable" drug dealer whose backstory states that he has been involved with crime for the previous few years. Calland stated that Jordan's "dark direction" occurred following a difficult upbringing and the death of his mother, which lead him to search for a "father figure" in the "drug world". Writers plotted the character into the show's year-long county lines drug trafficking storyline and Jordan is introduced during a special flashforward episode exploring the effects of the drug trafficking after a year. Calland expressed his excitement at joining the cast and working on "a hard hitting and relevant" storyline, which he hoped would create awareness for the issue.

Jordan is given a love interest in Leela Lomax (Kirsty-Leigh Porter) after he becomes involved with her family following her decision to foster Sid. Calland explained that Jordan finds Leela attractive and she is "drawn in with his flirtatious ways". Jordan interacts with Leela's daughter, Peri Lomax (Ruby O'Donnell), and finds that it takes a while to understand how to "play her". Calland noted that they are "very different" people, so Jordan has to alter his "tactics" when dealing with her. In December 2019, "flashforward" scenes showed a bodybag, with the victim unknown to viewers until a year later; after a year of speculation, it was revealed that Jordan had been killed-off when Ella Richardson (Erin Palmer) stabs him in the back.

== Other characters ==
Character	Episode(s)	Original broadcast date(s)	Actor	Circumstances
Doctor Green	5073−5074 (2 episodes)	2−3 January 2019	Peter Slater	A doctor who treats Maxine Minniver (Nikki Sanderson) after she contracts alcohol poisoning. Due to Maxine's time in the cold, Doctor Green informs Maxine's friends, Sienna Blake (Anna Passey) and Liberty Savage (Jessamy Stoddart), and partner, Damon Kinsella (Jacob Roberts), that she is diagnosing Maxine with pneumonia.
Counsellor	5075	4 January 2019	Christine Walsh	A counsellor for Imran Maalik (Ijaz Rana) who allows him to leave the anger management clinic he has been attending.
Miss Harrington	5076−5080 (5 episodes)	7−11 January 2019	Hermione Gulliford	The defence barrister at the trial of Buster Smith (Nathan Sussex). When Oliver Morgan (Aedan Duckworth) fails to show up to the trial she advises the judge to drop the case. She cross-examines Oliver, his father Luke Morgan (Gary Lucy), Brody Hudson (Adam Woodward) and Buster's son Damon Kinsella (Jacob Roberts). Her examination of Damon forces him to admit that he has lied on the stand. She also questions Imran Maalik (Ijaz Rana), but is surprised when he admits that Buster has also sexually abused him.
Mrs Maloney	5076−5080 (5 episodes)	7−11 January 2019	Judy Flynn	The prosecution barrister at the trial of Buster Smith (Nathan Sussex). When Oliver Morgan (Aedan Duckworth) fails to show up to the trial she advises that his video evidence is played instead. When Oliver does eventually show up, she questions him over his accusations. After Damon Kinsella (Jacob Roberts) is caught out over lying on the stand, she decides to drop the case against Brody Hudson (Adam Woodward). She also questions Buster during the trial.
Judge	5076−5080 (5 episodes)	7−11 January 2019	Michael Smith Stewart	The judge at the trial of Buster Smith (Nathan Sussex). After Luke Morgan (Gary Lucy) becomes enraged during his evidence, he orders that Luke be removed from the court. After Damon Kinsella (Jacob Roberts) is caught lying on the stand, he advises the jury to acquit Buster over the charge from Brody Hudson (Adam Woodward). After Buster is found guilty by the jury, the judge sentences him to six years in prison.
David	5076−5080 (2 episodes)	7−11 January 2019	George Astbury	Four men who appear during the trial of Buster Smith (Nathan Sussex) and report crimes relating to Buster, similar to those he is accused of. Chris tells Brody Hudson (Adam Woodward) that he believes his allegations against Buster. After Buster is found guilty, all four men greet Brody in the pub, and Jake confirms to him that they have all been sexually abused by Buster as well.
Reuben	5077−5080 (2 episodes)	8−11 January 2019	Alex Townson	Four men who appear during the trial of Buster Smith (Nathan Sussex) and report crimes relating to Buster, similar to those he is accused of. Chris tells Brody Hudson (Adam Woodward) that he believes his allegations against Buster. After Buster is found guilty, all four men greet Brody in the pub, and Jake confirms to him that they have all been sexually abused by Buster as well.
Chris	5078−5080 (2 episodes)	9−11 January 2019	Gabriel Clarke	Four men who appear during the trial of Buster Smith (Nathan Sussex) and report crimes relating to Buster, similar to those he is accused of. Chris tells Brody Hudson (Adam Woodward) that he believes his allegations against Buster. After Buster is found guilty, all four men greet Brody in the pub, and Jake confirms to him that they have all been sexually abused by Buster as well.
Jake	5079−5080 (2 episodes)	10−11 January 2019	Jordan Hakan Akkaya	Four men who appear during the trial of Buster Smith (Nathan Sussex) and report crimes relating to Buster, similar to those he is accused of. Chris tells Brody Hudson (Adam Woodward) that he believes his allegations against Buster. After Buster is found guilty, all four men greet Brody in the pub, and Jake confirms to him that they have all been sexually abused by Buster as well.
Solicitor	5080	11 January 2019	Sherine Chalhie	A solicitor who informs Mercedes McQueen (Jennifer Metcalfe), Myra McQueen (Nicole Barber-Lane) and Cleo McQueen (Nadine Mulkerrin) that Mercedes' deceased husband, millionaire Russ Owen (Stuart Manning), has left all of his money in a trust fund for his son, Max Owen (Gabriel Lawrence).
Father Paul	5081−5082 (2 episodes)	14−15 January 2019	Danny Bayne	A priest working at a soup kitchen with priest Joel Dexter (Rory Douglas-Speed). Goldie McQueen (Chelsee Healey) is attracted to him, and offers to volunteer at the soup kitchen to be with him. When Goldie asks him on a date and kisses him, he rejects her due to his position at the church.
Rex	5082	15 January 2019	Harry Capehorn	A friend of Liam Donovan (Jude Monk McGowan) who he brings to The Dog in the Pond public house to celebrate his thirtieth birthday. Rex is invited to Mercedes McQueen's (Jennifer Metcalfe) flat above the pub and accidentally stumbles into the bedroom of Mercedes' children, Max Owen (Gabriel Lawrence) and Bobby Costello (Jayden Fox), after having too much to drink, causing Max and Bobby to get scared and barricade the door.
Vernon	5088	23 January 2019	Charlie Ward	A friend of Zack Loveday (Duayne Boachie) who goes on a date with Zack's friend, Harry Thompson (Parry Glasspool). While they are on a date, Harry's on-off boyfriend, James Nightingale (Gregory Finnegan), arrives and confesses his love for Harry, ending his date with Vernon.
Tim	5090	25 January 2019	Day Rooney	A man who is hired by Jonny Baxter (Ray Quinn) to attack Terry Hay (Stuart Wolfenden) as revenge for Terry's abuse of his stepson and Jonny's friend, Ste Hay (Kieron Richardson), as a child.
Pippa Papadopolous	5101−5104 (2 episodes)	11−14 February 2019	Judy Holt	The admissions officer at a school for gifted children, where Bobby Costello (Jayden Fox) attends an interview for, accompanied by his mother Mercedes McQueen (Jennifer Metcalfe) and grandmother Myra McQueen (Nicole Barber-Lane). During the interview, Mercedes becomes offended by Pippa's implications about their social status and storms out. Pippa later visits the family's home to inform them that Bobby has not been accepted by the school, but after an impassioned speech by Mercedes, she agrees to accept Bobby.
Boy band	5104	14 February 2019	Mo Adeniran	The bandmates of Sami Maalik (Rishi Nair), who were all part of the boyband "Bad Boyz" as teenagers.
Boy band	5104	14 February 2019	Shaun Humphries	The bandmates of Sami Maalik (Rishi Nair), who were all part of the boyband "Bad Boyz" as teenagers.
Harriet	5113	27 February 2019	Su Elliot	The biological mother of Sylver McQueen (David Tag) who has dementia and is living in a nursing home. Sylver and his wife Mercedes McQueen (Jennifer Metcalfe) visit Harriet, but she does not recognise Sylver. Sylver's adoptive mother, Breda McQueen (Moya Brady), visits after Sylver and Mercedes; Harriet recognises Breda and is visibly scared of her, which Mercedes notices.
DJ Stevie Scaramouch	5115−5132 (4 episodes)	1−22 March 2019	Mark Curry	A DJ at the Duke Street social club who Lisa Loveday (Rachel Adedeji) and Martine Deveraux (Kéllé Bryan) believe has a crush on Scott Drinkwell (Ross Adams). When Myra McQueen (Nicole Barber-Lane) and Nana McQueen (Diane Langton) visit the club, Stevie flirts with Myra and kisses her. Myra's fiancée, Sally St. Claire (Annie Wallace), books Stevie as the DJ for their wedding, unaware of their kiss. When Stevie arrives at the wedding, Myra panics, so Scott and Nana pay Stevie to leave.
Police officer	5121	11 March 2019	Andrew Bentley	A police officer who interviews Liam Donovan (Jude Monk McGowan) after Sylver McQueen (David Tag) assaults him. When the police officer speaks to Sylver, he informs him that Liam has not witnessed the attack, so Sylver is unable to be convicted.
Dave	5124−5259 (8 episodes)	14 March– 19 September 2019	James Lewis	A member of a far-right political group ran by Stuart Sumner (Chris Simmons). During a family day which the group arranges, members Dave and Paul (Charlie Ryan) are introduced to Ste Hay (Kieron Richardson), who is being recruited to the group. When Shahid Shirani (Alex Williams) asks the group to move their car as they are blocking his motorcycle, Dave, Paul and Jonny Baxter (Ray Quinn) physically attack Shahid. Dave witnesses Ste destroying Amir Shirani's (Naveed Choudhry) motorcycle after he is goaded by Stuart and Jonny. Dave later informs Ste that his children, Leah Barnes (Elà-May Demircan) and Lucas Hay (William Hill), are with the Maalik family as they are celebrating Eid Mubarak, causing Ste to intervene and remove his children. Ste later asks Dave, Stuart and Jonny if he can join their plans. Dave records a video message of Ste prior to the group's planned attack on a community centre and he accepts an explosive device for the attack. When Stuart cancels their plans, Dave and Ste try to calm down a furious Jonny, but when Jonny decides to target The Loft nightclub, Dave leaves. When he notices an explosion, Dave calls Stuart, who then arranges an emergency meeting for the organisation. Dave, Stuart, Jonny and Ste are arrested for the explosion after it is deemed malicious. D.I. Malton (Laura Medforth) informs Dave that Stuart has made him the scapegoat for the attack and asks for him to tell her the truth; he lies and accepts responsibility, so she charges him with terrorism offences. When Ste feels guilty about this, Stuart tells him that Dave's children will be proud of him.
Paul	5124−5261 (4 episodes)	14 March– 23 September 2019	Charlie Ryan	A member of a far-right political group ran by Stuart Sumner (Chris Simmons). During a family day which the group arranges, members Paul and Dave (James Lewis) are introduced to Ste Hay (Kieron Richardson), who is being recruited to the group. When Shahid Shirani (Alex Williams) asks the group to move their car as they are blocking his motorcycle, Paul, Dave and Jonny Baxter (Ray Quinn) physically attack Shahid. Paul films Ste destroying Amir Shirani's (Naveed Choudhry) motorcycle after he is goaded by Stuart and Jonny.
Alice	5124−5309 (5 episodes)	14 March– 28 November 2019	Stacy Liu	The wife of Stuart Sumner (Chris Simmons), who is the leader of a far-right political organisation. She attends a family day which the group arranges. Alice later approaches Sinead Shelby (Stephanie Davis) after she restricts Ste Hay (Kieron Richardson) access to his daughter, Hannah Hay-O'Connor (Maddison Allen). Alice seemingly goads Sinead, but Sinead walks away from her. When the organisation are involved in the explosion of a bomb, Stuart instructs Alice to leave the village with their children. When Stuart's son, Sid Sumner (Billy Price), becomes homeless following Stuart's death, Sienna Blake (Anna Passey) meets with Alice and convinces her to let Sid live with her. However, when they arrive at Sienna's apartment, they find Sienna's partner, Brody Hudson (Adam Woodward), and half-sister, Liberty Savage (Jessamy Stoddart), confronting Sid about a knife he has brought into the apartment. Consequently, Alice disowns Sid and leaves.
Aiden	5124	14 March 2019	Harvey Farrell	The children of Stuart Sumner (Chris Simmons) and Alice (Stacy Liu) who attend a family day arranged by Stuart's far-right political group.
Violet	5124	14 March 2019	Eiry Shi	The children of Stuart Sumner (Chris Simmons) and Alice (Stacy Liu) who attend a family day arranged by Stuart's far-right political group.
Dr Taylor	5125	15 March 2019	Alexandra Rafter	A doctor who is treating Maxine Minniver (Nikki Sanderson) and informs her and her partner, Damon Kinsella (Jacob Roberts), that Maxine's test results indicate everything is normal.
Dimitri	5132−5133 (2 episodes)	26−27 March 2019	Dimitri Kissoff	The driver of the pumpkin coach which Myra McQueen (Nicole Barber-Lane) hires for her wedding. When Myra chooses to leave the village, Dimitri drives her away in the coach.
Ms Zahir	5139−5161 (2 episodes)	4 April− 6 May 2019	Marina Manoharan	A doctor who performs a lumbar puncture on Maxine Minniver (Nikki Sanderson) and discusses her possible diagnoses with her. When the test results of the lumbar puncture return, Ms Zahir informs Maxine that he does not have a brain disease.
Doctor Keely	5141−5143 (3 episodes)	8−10 April 2019	Martelle Edinborough	A doctor who admits Lily McQueen (Lauren McQueen), who is struggling with self-harm, into a mental health clinic. She explains the clinic to Lily and books her on counselling sessions. After discovering that Lily has contracted sepsis, she informs Farrah Maalik (Krupa Pattini) and looks for Lily, but she is informed by fellow patient Imogen (Annabelle Kaye) that Lily has left the clinic.
Doctor Dillon	5142	9 April 2019	Hussain Manawer	A doctor who leads a counselling session with Lily McQueen (Lauren McQueen), a patient at a mental health clinic.
Imogen	5142−5143 (2 episodes)	9−10 April 2019	Annabelle Kaye	A patient at a mental health clinic, which Lily McQueen (Lauren McQueen) is admitted onto. She befriends Lily and gives her a book. After seeing Lily try to break a light, Imogen comforts her and shares her own story with Lily. Following a visit from Lily's boyfriend, Romeo Quinn (Owen Warner), Imogen warns Lily against being with him. When Farrah Maalik (Krupa Pattini) and Doctor Keely (Martelle Edinborough) look for Lily, Imogen shares her fears that she has escaped the clinic with Romeo.
Woman	5144	11 April 2019	Natalie Poyser	A woman who discovers Lily McQueen (Lauren McQueen) collapsed in a toilet. When she notices Lily's family, Prince McQueen (Malique Thompson-Dwyer), Diane Hutchinson (Alex Fletcher) and Tony Hutchinson (Nick Pickard), looking for her, the woman directs them to Lily's location.
DJ	5145−5751	12 April 2019−27 December 2021	Uncredited	The son of Mandy (Sarah Jayne Dunn) and Luke Morgan (Gary Lucy) who is raised by Mandy and her partner, Darren Osborne (Ashley Taylor Dawson), who they believe is DJ's father. During the pregnancy, Mandy and Darren discover the baby has spina bifida, which is operated on before birth. Darren and Mandy name the baby Darren Junior (DJ). After his birth, a DNA test is produced, which Luke's son, Oliver Morgan (Aedan Duckworth), reads; he then announces that Darren is the father and chooses not to inform Luke.
Colin	5148−5161 (5 episodes)	17 April− 6 May 2019	Ed White	A former boyfriend of Kyle Kelly (Adam Rickitt) who attends a birthday party which Kyle's partner, Nancy Osborne (Jessica Fox), has arranged for him. Colin informs Nancy that Kyle has had sex with everyone in attendance at the party, and confronts Kyle about something which happened to them. As he leaves the party, he threatens Kyle with exposing the secret to Nancy. Colin arranges to meet Nancy, but Kyle meets him instead to listen to Colin's blackmail demands. Kyle steals valuable items for Colin and meets him again to give them to him. Colin convinces Kyle to give him a hug, which is witnessed by Darren Osborne (Ashley Taylor Dawson). When Colin is unable to sell the tablet computer given to him by Kyle, as it has been reported as stolen, he returns and threatens Kyle. Nancy later meets Colin, who reveals that Kyle scammed him out of some money.
Baz	5159	2 May 2019	Ricky Nixon	An associate of Liam Donovan (Jude Monk McGowan), who arrives, under Liam's instruction, to test whether Prince McQueen (Malique Thompson-Dwyer) is trustworthy enough to work for Liam. Baz tells Prince that he is an undercover police officer and threatens to arrest him, however Prince refuses to say anything, proving his loyalty to Liam.
Quizmaster	5159	2 May 2019	Chris Clarkson	A quizmaster on a television gameshow that Cleo McQueen (Nadine Mulkerrin) watches with her boyfriend, Mitchell Deveraux (Imran Adams), and his family, Martine Deveraux (Kéllé Bryan) and Walter Deveraux (Trevor A. Toussaint).
Officer Turley	5165−5260 (3 episodes)	10 May− 20 September 2019	Jonny Fines	A Prevent officer who is called to Hollyoaks High School when Sid Sumner (Billy Price) reports Imran Maalik (Ijaz Rana) for threatening to attack the school, which Imran has not done. Officer Turley speaks with Sid and Imran separately and clears Imran of any wrongdoing, before informing the school's headteacher, Sally St. Claire (Annie Wallace), that he believes that Sid's accusation was malicious. Officer Turley later approaches Ste Hay (Kieron Richardson) about his involvement with a far-right political organisation, but he is sent away. Ste later decides to leave the organisation, so he speaks with Officer Turley, who informs him that it cannot happen immediately and that he will have to remain with the organisation until he can be extracted.
D.S. Banks	5168−5245 (7 episodes)	15 May− 30 August 2019	Drew Cain	A detective sergeant who speaks with Farrah Maalik (Krupa Pattini) following a hit and run accident on Grace Black (Tamara Wall). He later questions Romeo Quinn (Owen Warner) about the incident when his alibi for Harry Thompson (Parry Glasspool) is proven false. Following Ste Hay's (Kieron Richardson) attack on Price Slice supermarket, D.S. Banks informs Ste and Jonny Baxter (Ray Quinn) that their planned march has been cancelled. He later investigates the case of Sienna Blake's (Anna Passey) missing twins after Sienna believes that she has found them. After seeing the children's passports, D.S. Banks informs Sienna that they are not her twins. When Sami Maalik (Rishi Nair) is attacked, D.S. Banks questions Jonny, Ste and Stuart Sumner (Chris Simmons) about whether they were involved, but they provide evidence for their location. When Sami, his family and his fiancée, Sinead Shelby (Stephanie Davis), discover floor plans for a community centre on a USB stick, they report Stuart and Jonny to the police. D.S. Banks informs them that they cannot use the evidence as Sinead and Yasmine Maalik (Haiesha Mistry) obtained it by breaking into Stuart's house. When Tony Hutchinson (Nick Pickard) goes missing, his friend Darren Osborne (Ashley Taylor Dawson) reports his disappearance, but D.S. Banks informs him that he cannot launch an investigation as Tony has not been missing for long enough. Tony's wife, Diane Hutchinson (Alex Fletcher), tells D.S. Banks that she does not want an investigation regardless.
Mr Chambers	5170	17 May 2019	Noel White	A member on the board for Hollyoaks High School who informs teaching assistant Sienna Blake (Anna Passey) and deputy head teacher Laurie Shelby (Kyle Pryor) that Sienna's sexual harassment claim against Laurie would not be pursued.
Barry	5173	22 May 2019	Dominic Doughty	The lawyer of Laurie Shelby (Kyle Pryor) who represents him when his wife, Sinead Shelby (Stephanie Davis), reports him for raping her.
D.C. Jones	5173−5198 (4 episodes)	22 May− 26 June 2019	Jessica Pearson	A detective constable who interviews Sinead Shelby (Stephanie Davis), her mother Diane Hutchinson (Alex Fletcher), and stepfather Tony Hutchinson (Nick Pickard) after Sinead reports her husband, Laurie Shelby (Kyle Pryor), for raping her. She visits Sinead at her home to clarify a date which Sinead has provided them; Sinead admits that she lied about the date, so D.C. Jones warns her that her testimony has been thrown into doubt. D.C. Jones visits Sinead again after she makes death threats towards Laurie; she informs Sinead that it has been ruled that she has lied about Laurie's attacks, so D.C. Jones arrests her for perverting the course of justice. When Sinead pushes Laurie from a balcony at Hollyoaks High School to prevent him from raping Diane, D.C. Jones arrives and arrests Sinead for violating her bail conditions. After reviewing CCTV footage of the incident, she arrests Laurie for attempting to rape Diane.
D.C. Khan	5173	22 May 2019	Rina Mahoney	A detective constable who questions Sally St. Claire (Annie Wallace), Mitchell Deveraux (Imran Adams), Sienna Blake (Anna Passey) and Nancy Osborne (Jessica Fox) about Laurie Shelby (Kyle Pryor) after he is arrested for raping his wife, Sinead Shelby (Stephanie Davis).
D.S. Moore	5173−5174 (2 episodes)	22−23 May 2019	Gillian Waugh	A detective sergeant who interviews Laurie Shelby (Kyle Pryor) after he is arrested for raping his wife, Sinead Shelby (Stephanie Davis). She also interviews Sienna Blake (Anna Passey) about Laurie's whereabouts on a date which Sinead has provided them. Sinead has lied about the date and Sienna confirms she was with Laurie, so he is released without charge.
Dan	5176	27 May 2019	Eugene Collins	A physiotherapist who Grace Black (Tamara Wall) attends.
George	5187	11 June 2019	Lee West	A far-right extremist who is invited to a protest march by Ste Hay (Kieron Richardson). The march turns violent and George encourages Ste to throw a brick through the window of The Hutch restaurant, before being arrested by the police.
Alison Hammond	5189−5190 (2 episodes)	13−14 June 2019	Herself	A television presenter on This Morning who answers a call from Maxine Minniver (Nikki Sanderson) on the show. Maxine calls after an argument with her boyfriend, Damon Kinsella (Jacob Roberts), and shares the story of her terminal illness. The following day, Alison arrives in the village and presents her with a cheque live on-air, explaining that the money is funded by viewers who were moved by Maxine's story.
D.C. Rawlings	5189	13 June 2019	Toby Decann	An associate of Jonny Baxter (Ray Quinn) and Stuart Sumner (Chris Simmons) who poses as a police officer to test Ste Hay's (Kieron Richardson) loyalty to their far-right political organisation.
Jessica	5196	24 June 2019	Ibinabo Jack	A waitress who Sienna Blake (Anna Passey) and Brody Hudson (Adam Woodward) visit at work in their search to find any more sexual assault victims of Laurie Shelby (Kyle Pryor). Jessica confirms that they had sex, but says it was consensual.
Rhona	5196	24 June 2019	Clara Darcy	A shoe shop clerk who Sienna Blake (Anna Passey) and Brody Hudson (Adam Woodward) visit at work in their search to find any more sexual assault victims of Laurie Shelby (Kyle Pryor). Rhonda reveals that Laurie raped her, but she refuses to bring a case against him as she is worried for her daughter's safety.
Vinnie	5203	3 July 2019	Lewis Fletcher	The deceased father of Goldie McQueen (Chelsee Healey), adoptive father of Sylver McQueen (David Tag) and husband of Breda McQueen (Moya Brady). Vinnie was abusive towards his family and when Goldie informed him that she was pregnant with twins, he heavily drinks alcohol. In a flashback to his death, Vinnie fights with Sylver (Elliot Ullah), who fears he has killed Vinnie. However, Vinnie regains consciousness and is murdered by Breda.
Jed	5207−5260 (6 episodes)	9 July− 20 September 2019	Lewis Fletcher	A man who is set up on a date with Ste Hay (Kieron Richardson) by Stuart Sumner (Chris Simmons) and Jonny Baxter (Ray Quinn). Ste is more interested in his former partner, Harry Thompson (Parry Glasspool), so ignores Jed during the date. When he is rejected by Harry, Ste asks Jed on a second date. They do not connect and Jed overhears Ste telling Stuart and Jonny negative things about him. Jonny arranges for Jed and Ste to go on another date, which is more successful. They then attend a far-right political protest march together. When Ste becomes disillusioned with Stuart's far-right organisation, Jed explains that the organisation grooms people into joining, and reveals that the crime he was forced to commit by the group. He admits that he has collected information on the organisation, which he plans to take to the police. Ste warns Jonny and Stuart about Jed's plans, so they approach him before he reaches the police station. They bring Jed to their house, where Stuart destroys the evidence and orders Ste to physically attack Jed as retribution. Ste later decides to leave the organisation and arranges to meet Jed for his help. After Ste is told to wait before leaving, Jed agrees to help Ste leave immediately. However, when Jed calls Ste, Stuart and Jonny discover the plan and physically attack Ste.
Susan Arkwright	5212	16 July 2019	Laura Emmitt	An employee at the venue where Maxine Minniver (Nikki Sanderson) and Damon Kinsella (Jacob Roberts) are planning to get married. Susan meets Maxine, Damon and Maxine's bridesmaids, Sienna Blake (Anna Passey) and Grace Black (Tamara Wall), and shows them around the venue. Susan reminds Maxine and Damon that they have not paid the rest of their fees, but when Maxine fakes a seizure, Susan recognises her from a recent television appeal and offers to waive the remaining fees.
Nina	5212−5222 (6 episodes)	16−30 July 2019	Olivia Harkness	An au pair of two toddlers who Sienna Blake (Anna Passey) notices while viewing a wedding venue. She believes the children to be her missing twin toddlers, Sophie Blake and Sebastian Blake. Sienna then watches Nina, before chatting with her and offering her a job, hoping that she will be able to get closer to the twins. The following day, Nina meets with Sienna at a local café and when Nina leaves to get the pair some drinks, Sienna steals her phone. Sienna returns the phone to Nina when she is unable to guess her password. On the day of the wedding, Sienna finds Nina at the venue and discovers that she is planning to leave with the children, so she ties Nina up and locks her in a cupboard. Sienna's sister, Liberty Savage (Jessamy Stoddart), and boyfriend, Brody Hudson (Adam Woodward), free Nina and they find Sienna preparing to leave. Nina shows Sienna pictures of the children with their father and implores her not to take them; Sienna agrees and Liberty persuades Nina not to press charges against Sienna. Nina then meets with the twins' actual father, Warren Fox (Jamie Lomas), confirming that they are Sophie and Sebastian. Nina explains that she used pictures of the twins with her brother, and Warren fires Nina, before leaving with the children.
Isaac Thompson	5213−5218	17−24 July 2019	Uncredited	The son of Harry Thompson (Parry Glasspool) and Sadie Cressington (Alexa Lee). He is born in The Hutch restaurant when Sadie goes into labour in the village. When Harry is murdered, Isaac leaves the village with Sadie.
Registrar	5222	30 July 2019	Lucas Smith	A registrar who marries Maxine Minniver (Nikki Sanderson) and Damon Kinsella (Jacob Roberts).
Sonia	5227−5228 (2 episodes)	6−7 August 2019	Millie Turner	A bartender at a festival who refuses to serve Juliet Quinn (Niamh Blackshaw) alcohol because she is underage. Juliet attempts to convince Sonia that she is not underage and asks her friend Brooke Hathaway (Tylan Grant) to confirm her story, but Brooke refuses to lie, so Sonia offers Juliet a lolly.
Paramedic	5229	8 August 2019	Jo Leary	A paramedic who treats Laurie Shelby (Kyle Pryor) after he collapses. The paramedic cannot detect a pulse on Laurie, so she declares him dead.
George	5229	8 August 2019	Eric Mok	A doctor at a festival who treats Brooke Hathaway (Tylan Grant) after she suffers an autistic meltdown due to the loud noise surrounding her. When Brooke asks George about her other symptoms, he suggests that she could be pregnant.
Live band performance	5229	8 August 2019	Tankus the Henge	A live band performing at a festival. Lisa Loveday (Rachel Adedeji) and Cleo McQueen (Nadine Mulkerrin) go onstage and dance while they perform.
Hipster	5233	14 August 2019	William Rodell	A hipster who goes on a date with Goldie McQueen (Chelsee Healey). He calls himself "Hashtag", but admits that his real name is Neil Jones. Although his mannerisms annoy her, when Goldie sees Joel Dexter (Rory Douglas-Speed), she kisses Hashtag to make Joel jealous.
D.S. Gray	5237−5239 (3 episodes)	20−22 August 2019	Lyndsay Fielding	A detective sergeant who investigates the murder of Louis Loveday (Karl Collins) after his body is discovered in the pond outside The Dog in the Pond public house. She confirms to Louis' daughter, Lisa Loveday (Rachel Adedeji), that the body is Louis, and speaks with Breda McQueen (Moya Brady) as she was the last person to see Louis alive; Breda informs D.S. Gray that Louis was having an affair with both Leela Lomax (Kirsty-Leigh Porter) and Martine Deveraux (Kéllé Bryan), so she questions them. She then informs Lisa, Martine and Breda that forensics on the body could help solve the case. D.S. Gray then attends a neighbourhood watch meeting arranged by Jack Osborne (Jimmy McKenna). When Lisa asks about Louis' ring which he wore on a necklace, D.S. Gray says that there was no ring with Louis.
D.C. Garston	5239−5271 (3 episodes)	22 August− 7 October 2019	Chris Jack	A detective constable who arrests Damon Kinsella (Jacob Roberts) for fraud after he is reported for embezzling money out of a charity fund set up for Maxine Minniver (Nikki Sanderson). He interviews Damon and informs him that he could face a long prison sentence. When Breda McQueen (Moya Brady) makes an anonymous tip-off to the police, D.C. Garston arrests James Nightingale (Gregory Finnegan) for the murder of Harry Thompson (Parry Glasspool). He interviews James before releasing him on bail.
Nurse	5254	12 September 2019	Shareesa Valentine	A nurse at an abortion clinic who arranges appointments for Brooke Hathaway (Tylan Grant) and Mercedes McQueen (Jennifer Metcalfe).
D.I. Malton	5255−5259 (5 episodes)	13−19 September 2019	Laura Medforth	A detective inspector who observes a far-right political organisation, including Stuart Sumner (Chris Simmons), Jonny Baxter (Ray Quinn), Ste Hay (Kieron Richardson) and Dave (James Lewis) over several days, photographing them and taking notes on their actions. She overhears Ste threatening Sinead Shelby (Stephanie Davis) and Sami Maalik (Rishi Nair) with a secret plan which would make people take him seriously. When Stuart notices D.I. Malton watching the organisation, he cancels their plans to attack a community centre. Following the explosion of a bomb, D.I. Malton searches for Jonny at the local hospital, but he has left. She rules the explosion a malicious attack and questions Misbah Maalik (Harvey Virdi), before arresting and questioning Stuart, Jonny, Ste and Dave. D.I. Malton informs Dave that Stuart has made him the scapegoat for the attack and asks for him to tell her the truth; he lies and accepts responsibility, so she charges him with terrorism offences.
Barry	5256	16 September 2019	Ant Bacon	A man who attends a recruitment drive arranged by Stuart Sumner's (Chris Simmons) far-right political organisation. After listening to a speech from Ste Hay (Kieron Richardson), he congratulates him and asks for a picture with him.
Nurse Saqib	5258−5259 (2 episodes)	18−19 September 2019	Kishen Tanna	A nurse who attempts to treat Jonny Baxter (Ray Quinn) after he is injured in an explosion. Jonny is racist towards her and demands to be treated by a British nurse, which Nurse Saqib informs him that she is. When DI Malton (Laura Medforth) arrives at the hospital to find Jonny, Nurse Saqib informs her that Jonny has discharged himself.
Simon	5261	23 September 2019	Tarrick Benham	A man who is set up on a date with James Nightingale (Gregory Finnegan) by his mother, Marnie Nightingale (Lysette Anthony), and half-sister, Juliet Quinn (Niamh Blackshaw). James realises what Marnie and Juliet are planning, so he scares Simon away.
Ralph	5268	2 October 2019	Joel Stockhill	A man who goes on a date with Cindy Cunningham (Stephanie Waring). When Ralph overshares about his disgusting habits, Cindy ends the date and leaves with Luke Morgan (Gary Lucy), who is also on a date at the same place.
Rochelle	5268	2 October 2019	Nicole Evans	A woman who goes on a date with Luke Morgan (Gary Lucy). When Rochelle annoys Luke with her laugh and mannerisms, he ends the date and leaves with Cindy Cunningham (Stephanie Waring), who is also on a date at the same place.
Troy	5270−5272 (3 episodes)	4−8 October 2019	Ashley Luke Lloyd	A male escort who is booked by James Nightingale (Gregory Finnegan). James books Troy again so he can make his family believe that he is coping with the death of his boyfriend, Harry Thompson (Parry Glasspool), but Troy leaves when James' son, Romeo Quinn (Owen Warner), confronts them.
Accountant	5271	7 October 2019	Ayesha De Garci	An accountant who informs Maxine Minniver (Nikki Sanderson) that she is bankrupt.
Midwife	5273	9 October 2019	Rachel Toomes	A midwife who performs a scan on Brooke Hathaway (Tylan Grant). After the scan, she questions Brooke about her pregnancy, causing Brooke to panic and Brooke's guardian, Nancy Osborne (Jessica Fox), to tell the midwife to stop asking questions.
Noel	5276	14 October 2019	Alex Bailey	A man who attends Mercedes McQueen's (Jennifer Metcalfe) birthday party at The Dog in the Pond public house, where he sees Scott Drinkwell (Ross Adams) performing in drag. Noel approaches Scott after his performance and flirts with him, before being interrupted by Mitchell Deveraux (Imran Adams), who is romantically involved with Scott. Before Noel leaves, Scott gives him his phone number.
Social worker	5281	21 October 2019	Steph Lacey	A social worker who discusses the adoption process with teenage parents Oliver Morgan (Aedan Duckworth) and Brooke Hathaway (Tylan Grant).
Doctor Burgman	5283	23 October 2019	Catherine Cusack	A therapist who Breda McQueen (Moya Brady) meets for an appointment. When Breda leaves her appointment abruptly, Doctor Burgman warns Breda's children, Goldie McQueen (Chelsee Healey) and Sylver McQueen (David Tag), and partner, Jack Osborne (Jimmy McKenna), that she believes that Breda is suffering from dementia.
Vicar	5286	28 October 2019	Philip Broadbent	A vicar who performs the christening of DJ Osborne.
Doctor Slavin	5290	1 November 2019	Rebecca Bainbridge	A doctor who asks student nurse Cleo McQueen (Nadine Mulkerrin) to help her with a patient; Cleo then informs her that she has quit her job.
Vanessa	5296	11 November 2019	Alexandra Maxwell	A florist who is booked by Azim Desai (Nav Sidhu) for the wedding of Sami Maalik (Rishi Nair) and Sinead Shelby (Stephanie Davis). Vanessa has a meeting with Sami's deaf half-sister, Yasmine Maalik (Haiesha Mistry), but becomes bored with Yasmine's deafness. When Yasmine's friend, Finn O'Connor (Keith Rice), criticises Vanessa's attitude towards Yasmine, she leaves.
Benjamin	5298	13 November 2019	John Tueart	A Prevent officer who meets Ste Hay (Kieron Richardson) when he attempts to leave Stuart Sumner's (Chris Simmons) far-right political organisation. Ste claims that his name is Harry and Benjamin advises him on how he can leave the group. When Benjamin gains Ste's trust, he admits his real name.
Sheeba Desai	5301−5302 (2 episodes)	18−19 November 2019	Rekha John-Cheriyan	The mother of Sami Maalik (Rishi Nair) and Azim Desai (Nav Sidhu) who arrives for Sami's wedding to Sinead Shelby (Stephanie Davis). Sheeba tries to meet Sinead, who is absent, but Azim claims that it is bad luck for them to meet before the wedding. Sheeba helps Sami's half-sister, Yasmine Maalik (Haiesha Mistry), get ready for the wedding and compliments her on her beauty. When Sinead cancels the wedding, Sheeba comforts Sami and offers to set him up with a Gujarati woman, which annoys Sami's family. Sheeba also expresses her disapproval about Azim's romantic feelings towards Ste Hay (Kieron Richardson); in response, Azim warns Sheeba that she cannot dictate the partners of him or Sami. Sheeba then leaves to return to London.
Doctor Bunce	5303	20 November 2019	Richard Hand	A doctor who diagnoses Luke Morgan (Gary Lucy) with a shrinkage on the brain due to a long-standing condition. He asks Luke to return to the hospital during the following day for further tests.
Sonographer	5304	21 November 2019	Kate Victors	A sonographer who performs an ultrasound on Brooke Hathaway (Tylan Grant), who is pregnant, when she attends an appointment with Sienna Blake (Anna Passey), who is hoping to adopt the baby. The sonographer writes down the sex of the baby for them.
Doctor Walker	5306	25 November 2019	Lucinda Sinclair	A doctor who informs Liberty Savage (Jessamy Stoddart) that she cannot be a surrogate for her half-sister, Sienna Blake (Anna Passey), as Sienna's last remaining embryo is not viable.
Social worker	5311	2 December 2019	Angela Hazeldine	A social worker who collects Sid Sumner (Billy Price) after he requests to be taken into social care.
Doctor Parker	5313−5369 (2 episodes)	4 December 2019− 20 February 2020	Ben Addis	A doctor who performs an MRI scan and blood tests on Luke Morgan (Gary Lucy), who he subsequently diagnoses with frontotemporal dementia and refers to a clinic. Luke has another appointment with Doctor Parker when he fears his dementia is progressing; he informs Luke that the condition is still in the early stages, but also warns him that it is hereditary.
Stan	5313−5314 (2 episodes)	4−5 December 2019	Joe Simpson	A Christmas tree salesman who agrees to hire Finn O'Connor (Keith Rice) after being persuaded by Yasmine Maalik (Haiesha Mistry). Stan and Finn visit Hollyoaks High School as their first job, where Finn unintentionally meets Nancy Osborne (Jessica Fox) and Sally St. Claire (Annie Wallace), who inform Stan that Finn is a convicted rapist; Stan then fires Finn.
Thug	5320	13 December 2019	Samuel Edward Taylor	A thug who is hired by James Nightingale (Gregory Finnegan) and Liam Donovan (Jude Monk McGowan) to fake a mugging on Kyle Kelly (Adam Rickitt). When he mugs Kyle, James and Liam intervene to save him.
