= Cerith Flinn =

Welsh actor

- Born: 29 September 1986 (age 39); Swansea, Wales, United Kingdom
- Years active: 2009–present
- Television: Wolfblood; EastEnders; Hollyoaks

Cerith Flinn (born 29 September 1986) is a Welsh actor known for his work across British television. Hailing from Swansea, Wales. Flinn was born to a Welsh father and Scottish mother, giving him a proud Celtic heritage that often informs his grounded and passionate performances. He rose to prominence with his breakout role as Aran in the CBBC fantasy drama Wolfblood, where he became a fan favourite. He later joined the cast of BBC soap EastEnders as Gethin Pryce a role that further cemented his status as a versatile and compelling screen presence. Flinn also starred as Levi Rochester in Channel 4 soap Hollyoaks, continuing his run of notable appearances in British drama. With a career spanning both stage and screen, Flinn is recognised for bringing depth, charm, and authenticity to every role he plays.

== Screen ==
Cerith Flinn began his screen career with guest roles in Hotel Babylon for the BBC and Strike Back for Cinemax (2012), before starring as James in the short film One Year On. He gained wider recognition between (2013) and (2017) for his recurring role as Aran in the CBBC fantasy drama Wolfblood. This was followed by appearances in Casualty (2015) for the BBC and the historical series Queens: The Virgin and the Martyr for Televisión Española (2017), where he portrayed Francis Throckmorton. That same year, he landed a regular role as Gethin Pryce in BBC EastEnders, moving into Albert Square as the new drama teacher at Walford Highschool. His character saw a romantic relationship develop with Sonia Fowler, played by Natalie Cassidy. He also took on the lead role of Bernard the Bellboy in the dark comedy murder mystery The Fitzroy (2017), a critically acclaimed British Independent feature film set aboard a post-apocalyptic submarine. The Fitzroy went on to win the Special Jury Prize for Excellence in Title Design at SXSW. In (2019), Flinn joined Hollyoaks as Levi Rochester, continuing his streak of standout performances in British television drama. Levi was introduced as a specialist doctor for Maxine Minniver played by Nikki Sanderson Munchausen's syndrome storyline and is also introduced as a love interest for Scott Drinkwell played by Ross Adams.

== Voice ==
Alongside his screen work, Flinn has established himself as a prolific voice actor. In (2016), he proudly featured in the special jury edition of The Archers on BBC Radio 4, playing Blake alongside Eileen Atkins, Catherine Tate, and Nigel Havers. In 2024 alone, he voiced Dafydd in BBC radio 3 Kenny Morgan, written by Mike Poulton and inspired by Terence Rattigan The Deep Blue Sea. In the rivived era of Doctor Who he played characters such as Lucas in Big Finish Productions Torchwood: The Hollow Choir and Iain in Torchwood: Widdershins. He also narrated the WWII National Geographic docu-series Liberation: D-Day to Berlin for Disney+. In computer gaming, he voiced characters in Atlus and Studio Zero highly anticipated release Metaphor: ReFantazio for PlayStation 4, PlayStation 5, Windows, and Xbox Series X/S on October 11, 2024 by Atlus in Japan and Sega internationally. The game was nominated for several awards, including Game of the Year at The Game Awards 2024.

== Theatre ==
Flinn began his professional theatre career while still training at the prestigious Drama Centre London. In his second term of his final year, he performed in The London Theatre Company's production of Under Milk Wood by Dylan Thomas at the Kiln Theatre (formerly the Tricycle Theatre London) with Philip Madoc and David Jason (2008). Showcasing his versatility, he played multiple characters including Dai Bread, Butcher Beynon, Mog Edwards, No Good Boyo, and Sinbad Sailor.

Following his graduation, Flinn continued to build a strong stage presence. In (2012), he appeared at Southwark Playhouse as Marplot in an adaptation of Susanna Centlivre’s The Busy Body, directed by Laurence Olivier Award winner Jessica Swale. That same year, he performed in Philip Ridley’s Feathers in Snow, also at Southwark Playhouse.

In (2018), Flinn joined the Everyman Theatre, Liverpool celebrated repertory company, appearing in a trio of diverse productions: A Clockwork Orange, Paint Your Wagon, and The Big I Am. In the fourth and final show of the Everyman Theatre season, in a standout performance, he played Cassio in Othello, starring alongside Golda Rosheuvel in the title role.

== Personal life ==
Flinn resides in Wales with his wife Kirsty Jones, a photographer.

Flinn lives with Type 1 Diabetes and Coeliac Disease. Flinn serves as an ambassador for Diabetes UK and Diabetes Cymru. He has delivered talks at the Senedd in Cardiff and at King’s College London, helping to raise awareness of Type 1 diabetes — particularly among young people.
