= Cerith =

Cerith is a given name. Notable people with the given name include:

- Cerith Wyn Evans (born 1958), Welsh conceptual artist, sculptor, and film-maker
- Cerith Flinn (born 1986), Welsh actor
