= Oliver Cotton =

English actor (born 1944)

- Born: 20 June 1944 (age 82); London, England
- Occupations: Actor; comedian; playwright

Oliver Charles Cotton (born 20 June 1944) is an English actor and playwright, known for his prolific work on stage, TV and film. He remains best known for his role as Cesare Borgia in the BBC's 1981 drama series The Borgias.

== Early life ==
Cotton was born in London on 20 June 1944, the son of Ester and Robert Norman Cotton. He trained at the Drama Centre, London.

== Career ==
Cotton worked extensively at the National Theatre Company during the period when Sir Laurence Olivier was its artistic director. Cotton played leading roles in many productions including The Royal Hunt of the Sun, Rosencrantz and Guildenstern Are Dead, Much Ado in About Nothing, As You Like It, Peter Brook’s Oedipus, In His Own Write and many others.

At the Royal Court in London, Cotton has played leads in many productions including The Local Stigmatic, The Duchess of Malfi, Man is Man, The Tutor by Bertholt Brecht, Lear and Bingo by Edward Bond. He was a founder member of Joint Stock appearing in the company's inaugural production The Speakers by Heathcote Williams.

For the Royal Shakespeare Company he has played leading roles in Granville Barker's The Marrying of Ann Leete, Henry VI, Edward IV, Richard III, The Plain Dealer, Some Americans Abroad by Richard Nelson, and as the Mayor in Brand by Ibsen in 2003.

In the West End he has starred in The Homecoming by Harold Pinter, Children of A Lesser God by Mark Medoff, Benefactors by Michael Frayn, An Ideal Husband by Oscar Wilde, Life x 3 by Yasmina Reza (RNT transfer), "Passion Play" (by Peter Nichols). He also played King Lear at the Southwark Playhouse and performed as Malvolio in a (historically correct all-male) production Twelfth Night at the reconstruction of Shakespeare's Globe. At the Old Vic, under the directorship of Kevin Spacey, he appeared as Seth Lord in The Philadelphia Story, as Northumberland in Richard II, and as Dr Finache in A Flea in Her Ear. In 2010 he played Henry IV in Shakespeare's Henry IV at the Globe Theatre. At Chichester he has appeared as Jim Casy in The Grapes Of Wrath in 2009 and as Arturo Santaniello in The Syndicate. In 2012, he played Victor Velasco in a major tour of Barefoot in the Park. In 2013 he played Jim in Passion Play by Peter Nichols at the Duke of York's Theatre – and in 2014 starred as Billy in his own play Daytona at the Theatre Royal Haymarket.

His numerous TV appearances have included The Borgias (Cesare Borgia), David Copperfield, The Year of The French, The Party, Room at the Bottom, Space:1999, Redemption, Poirot, The Camomile Lawn, Westbeach, Sharpe's Battle, Rhodes, All Quiet on the Preston Front, Innocents, Judge John Deed, Inspector Lynley, Waking The Dead, Murder Investigation Team, Beastly Games, Margaret, Money, Ripper Street and Lovejoy.

His films include Here We Go Round The Mulberry Bush, The Day Christ Died, Oliver Twist, Firefox, The Sicilian, Eleni, Hiding Out, Christopher Columbus, Son of the Pink Panther, The Innocent Sleep, Phoenix Blue, The Opium War, Beowulf, Baby Blue, The Dancer Upstairs, Shanghai Knights, Bone Hunter, Rain Dogs, Colour Me Kubrick, Pope Joan, The Dark Knight Rises, Gangs of Tooting Broadway, A Long Time Coming.

== Writing ==
For the stage Cotton's writing includes: The Enoch Show (Royal Court), Scrabble (National Theatre), Wet Weather Cover (King's Head Theatre), Daytona (Park Theatre, London, 2013), Dessert (Southwark Playhouse, 2017) and The Score (Theatre Royal, Bath, 2023). His TV and film scripts include: A Touch of Frost, Diamond Geezer, Trace, The Intruder, Singing for Stalin, Sofa, Wet Weather Cover: The Movie, Peeping Through and The English Game.

== Filmography ==
=== Film ===
Year	Title	Role	Notes
1968	Here We Go Round the Mulberry Bush	Curtis	
1982	Firefox	Dmitri Priabin	
1985	Eleni	Katis	
1987	The Sicilian	Cmdr. Roccofino	
1987	Hiding Out	Killer	
1992	Christopher Columbus: The Discovery	Harana	
1993	Son of the Pink Panther	King Haroak	
1996	The Innocent Sleep	Lusano	
1997	Queen: Made in Heaven	Man	
1997	Yapian zhanzheng		
1999	Beowulf	Hrothgar	
2000	Innocents	Mike Angelini	
2001	Baby Blue	Ron Wood	
2002	The Dancer Upstairs	Merino	
2003	Shanghai Knights	Jack the Ripper	
2003	The Bone Hunter	Regulus	
2004	Raindogs	Duke	
2004	Steamboy	Robert Stephenson	Voice
2005	Colour Me Kubrick	PC Metcalf	Uncredited
2009	Pope Joan	Arsenius	
2012	The Dark Knight Rises	2 Star Air Force General	
2013	Gangs of Tooting Broadway	Marcus	
2015	North v South	Brian Galloway	
2017	Pylon	The Chairman	
2020	Wonder Woman 1984	Simon Stagg	
2021	The Last Duel	Jean de Carrouges III	

=== Television ===
Year	Title	Role	Notes
1970–1973	Z-Cars	Chick Randall / Robert Durley / John North	4 episodes
1975	Space: 1999	Spearman	1 episode
1981	The Borgias	Cesare Borgia	10 episodes
1982	Oliver Twist	Monks	TV movie
1983	Bergerac	Jacques Laronde	1 episode
1983	Jemima Shore Investigates	Renard	1 episode
1986	Lovejoy	Frobel	1 episode
1986	Robin of Sherwood	Lord Owen of Clun	2 episodes
1986	C.A.T.S. Eyes	Stefan Johns	1 episode
1986–1988	Room at the Bottom	Tom	6 episodes
1989	Boon	Raoul Gomez	1 episode
1990	Agatha Christie's Poirot	Gregorie Rolf	1 episode
1992	The Camomile Lawn	Max	3 episodes
1993	West beach	Alan Cromer	10 episodes
1995	Sharpe's Battle	Loup	TV movie
1997	Heartbeat	Harry Adams	1 episode
2001	The Bill	DI Hubbard	1 episode
2001	Judge John Deed	Maurice Phillips QC	1 episode
2003	Casualty	Chris Cassidy	1 episode
2004	Waking the Dead	Sir Charles Stewart	1 episode
2004	Dalziel and Pascoe	Keith Henshaw	Episode: "Great Escapes"
2005	Midsomer Murders	Michael Maybury	1 episode
2009	Margaret	Michael Heseltine	TV movie
2014	Penny Dreadful	Father Matthews	1 episode
2014	New Tricks	Hugh Dryden	1 episode

=== Video game ===
Year	Title	Role	Notes
2008	Fable II	Lucien Fairfax	
2016	Hitman	Additional Voices, Civilian Male 05, Tharn Srisai, Hotel Staff Member, Hotel Groundskeeper, Hospital Director, Hotel Staff, Landlord, Wes Liston, Ezra Berg, The Curator	
2021	Hitman 3	Gregory Carlisle, Mr. Fernsby	
