= Nav Sidhu =

British actor

Nav Sidhu is a British television, theatre, and film actor. His longest-running television role was as Azim Desai in the Channel 4/E4 soap opera Hollyoaks.

== Career ==
=== Film ===
Year	Title	Role	Notes	Ref.
2013	The Patrol	Smudge		
2013	How I Live Now	Checkpoint Soldier		
2013	Gangs of Tooting Broadway	Arun		
2012	I, Anna	D.C. Brooks		

=== Television ===
Year	Title	Role	Notes	Ref.
2020	Casualty	Hafiz Idrisi	Episode 34.36	
2019–2020	Hollyoaks	Azim Desai	30 episodes	
2019	Shakespeare & Hathaway: Private Investigators	Scott Blacksell	Episode 2.4 "Beware the Ides of March"	
2018	Informer	Mr Rahim	Episode 1.2 "Strawberry Fields"	
2018	Girlfriends	Rob	Episodes 1.1 & 1.2	
2017	Holby City	Brian Heyes	Episode 19.52 "Left Behind"	
2017	Doctors	Billy Chopra	Episode 18.165 "Restricted View"	
2017	Silent Witness	DS Carl Pope	Episodes 20.5 "Remembrance: Part 1" & 20.6 "Remembrance: Part 2"	
2015	Man Down	Naz	Episode 2.3 "Diversity"	
2015	Cucumber	Mahadev	Episode 1.3	
2014	Edge of Heaven	Donkey	6 episodes (entire series)	
2014	Doctors	Faisal Hussain	Episode 16.144 "Harsh Conditions"	
2013	Run	Jimmy	4 episodes (entire miniseries)	
2011	Random	Deepak	TV movie	
2011	Coming Up	Nikesh	Episode 9.4 "Food"	
2009	Spooks	Bal	Episode 8.7	

=== Theatre ===
Year	Title	Role	Theatre / Company	Notes	Ref.
2018	Sketching	Tom	Wilton's Music Hall		
2017	The Worst Wedding Ever	Scott	Salisbury Playhouse		
2015	Volpone	Notary, Officer, Servant	Swan Theatre (Royal Shakespeare Company)		
2015	Love's Sacrifice	Guard, Friar	Swan Theatre (Royal Shakespeare Company)		
2015	The Jew of Malta	Callapine	Swan Theatre (Royal Shakespeare Company)		
2013	Pigeons	Amir	Royal Court Theatre		
2013	Talk Show	Darryl	Royal Court Theatre		
2013	The History Boys	Akthar	Crucible Theatre		
2010	The Empire	Zia	Royal Court Theatre		
2009–2010	Arabian Nights	Masud, Ali Baba’s Son, Watchman, Page, Perviz	Courtyard Theatre (Royal Shakespeare Company)		
