= Sally St. Claire =

Fictional character from Hollyoaks

- Hollyoaks character
- Portrayed by: Annie Wallace
- Duration: 2015–2024, 2026
- First appearance: Episode 4244; 29 October 2015
- Last appearance: Episode 6682; 18 February 2026
- Introduced by: Bryan Kirkwood (2015); Hannah Cheers (2026)
In-universe information
- Other names: Iain Naismith
- Occupation: Headteacher
- Sons: John Paul McQueen
- Grandsons: Matthew McQueen

Sally St. Claire is a fictional character from the Channel 4 soap opera Hollyoaks, played by Annie Wallace. The character made her first on-screen appearance on 29 October 2015 and Wallace is the first transgender person to play a regular transgender character in British soap opera. She was cast after the show held casting workshops to discover acting talent in the transgender community. Sally is characterised as a strict, "no-nonsense" headteacher who moves to Hollyoaks village to work at the local school. Hollyoaks' writers explored the character's transgender status and worked alongside equal rights group All About Trans, who consulted and advised to make the story realistic. In one surprise storyline, Sally is revealed to be the biological parent of John Paul McQueen (James Sutton). Sally's departure from the show was announced on 5 September 2024, and she made her final on-screen appearance in the episode broadcast on 11 September 2024.

== Casting ==
Hollyoaks featured a transgender character named Blessing Chambers played by actress Modupe Adeyeye. The trans community were not impressed with the show for not hiring a transgender actress for the role. Hollyoaks casting department were not familiar with any out transgender actors. They decided to create a casting workshop alongside equal rights group All About Trans. 30 transgender people were in attendance during the workshop. Wallace was selected from the group and invited to play the role of Sally.

Wallace's casting was first acknowledged publicly via an article in The Guardian, written by transgender rights activist Paris Lees. She is the first transgender actress to play a regular transgender character in the British soap opera genre. The casting announcement came at a time rival soap opera EastEnders announced that they had developed similar plans casting transgender actor Riley Carter Millington as Kyle Slater.

Hollyoaks were not originally going to announce Wallace's casting until the following week. They also planned not to announce the fact that Wallace is transgender. But with Millington's casting public knowledge, the show released a press release. Wallace believed that transgender actors were being hired more in 2015 because of the newfound willingness of casting directors and dramas themselves to represent the community.

Hollyoaks later announced that Sally would be introduced as the show's new headteacher at Hollyoaks High; replacing the role previously taken by Patrick Blake's (Jeremy Sheffield). Sally was billed as having a "no-nonsense attitude" and arrive at the school to help correct the behaviour of wayward students. It was also revealed that the character had an ulterior motive for moving to Hollyoaks. Of her casting Wallace stated "I'm delighted to be joining Hollyoaks as Mrs. St. Claire. She's such a great character and my first couple of scenes with Jeremy really show off her feisty personality – she's a force to be reckoned with." Wallace hoped her involvement with the show would change public perceptions of transgender people. She claimed "we're helping to change hearts and minds from people's living rooms."

== Development ==
=== Characterisation ===
"Mrs St Claire is a no-nonsense kinda lady who arrived in the village as the new head honcho at Hollyoaks High. She's defo not one of those chummy teachers who extends deadlines and lets you sing in class. [...] Kids and colleagues may panic when they spot her marching down the corridor, ready to dish out a sharp put-down ("Tuck your shirt in, you're not Kanye West!"), but her iron-fist attitude is actually masking a secret she's frightened to reveal."

Sally is characterised as a strict headteacher who has a "no-nonsense" approach towards people and daily situations. She has a strong dislike of bullies and sneaky people. She is determined to influence her schools with her own policy. She is not a vindictive woman and only hands out punishments for good reasons. Wallace has said that Sally uses her strict nature as "a bit of a front" that hides a "softer side".

=== Transgender status ===
Sally initially keeps her transgender status a secret because of negative past experiences. At her previous school when parents and teachers found out they began to bully her. John Paul McQueen (James Sutton) is first to learn about her transition. He accidentally makes the discovery but is supportive towards Sally. Wallace told Daniel Kilkelly from Digital Spy that "it's the last thing Sally wanted to happen so soon after joining." Sally is "terrified" and "fears" that those at Hollyoaks High will treat her the same as her previous school. John Paul's support for Sally becomes a positive in her life. He wants her to fit in with everyone else. Wallace enjoyed working with Sutton because he offered her support off-camera. When more character learn of her status Sally has become more settled at the school. The actress said that Sally has "earned respect" and enjoys working at the school. While it not an ideal situation, she feels better equipped to deal with everyone knowing.

The first student to learn about Sally being transgender is Peri Lomax (Ruby O'Donnell). Sally refuses to let Peri hand in her work assignment late which upsets her. Peri wants revenge and she defaces a student art display which Sally is planning to unveil during an event hosted for the parents of students. When Sally unveils the exhibition there is red graffiti spelling out the derogatory term "tranny". Sally is shocked and upset that everyone knows that she is transgender. Wallace told Laura Heffernan from Inside Soap that her character stands up for herself and states that she will not tolerate transphobia.

The events do leave Sally's future in Hollyoaks uncertain. Wallace said that her character may behave as "a bit of a hard act" but the revelation is a "real dent to her self-esteem and she truly believes she is about to lose everything dearest to her." Sally announces her intention to resign from her position but John Paul tries to persuade her otherwise. But Sally mistakes John Paul's concern for criticism and she slaps him in the face. The actress explained that John Paul gives Sally "tough love" but says the wrong thing. Sally then "hates herself for lashing out" and cannot believe she has hurt the one person who had defended her.

=== John Paul McQueen ===
In the episode that aired on 15 March 2016, a surprise storyline unfolded for viewers. Sally and Myra McQueen (Nicole Barber-Lane) interact for the first time and it is revealed that Sally is John Paul's father. While the story was kept a secret and not mentioned in press spoilers, Wallace had known about it for six months. Sutton was also involved in Wallace's audition process when producers were secretly testing their on-camera compatibility. She was told during a storyline conference and Wallace found keeping the secret "delightful". Some fans managed to figure out the story after they noticed Sally keeping a photograph of John Paul weeks before.

The actress told Kilkelly that Sally came to Hollyoaks to find John Paul. She always knew he existed but she always felt unable to visit him. But as she has reached fifty-years-old and the height of her profession, she decided it was time. When the job position came up at Hollyoaks High, Sally knew the McQueen family lived in the village and she had found the perfect opportunity to be close to him. Despite not revealing her identity, Wallace defended Sally stating "She's been keeping it a secret from John Paul because she's too scared of how he's going to react, but she's still tried to be in his company all the time."

Some viewers perceived the story to be too outlandish. But Wallace noted that scriptwriters had been in contact with All About Trans for advice. She also claimed that it is not an uncommon scenario for a transgender person to become embroiled in. Trans people may have children existing from before their transition was complete. Wallace quipped the most uncommon and "very soap" part of the story was that it featured a headteacher and employee. On-screen Myra orders Sally to never tell John Paul the truth. She had lied to him that Ricky Bowen (Simon Cassidy) was his father. Myra knows it will destroy their bond if he knows she lied.

== Storylines ==
Sally first appears introducing herself to Patrick Blake (Jeremy Sheffield) as his replacement. He is immediately irritated by Sally, and his wife Maxine Minniver (Nikki Sanderson) later starts a riot at the school when she has Patrick fired with immediate effect. She takes a shine to John Paul, and when he is helping her move into her new office, he comes across a document stating that Sally's birth name is "Iain Naismith", and realises that she is transgender. She later confirms this when he asks her about it. She is devastated in January 2016 when Peri, after hearing a conversation between her and John Paul, vandalises the school art exhibition, outing her as transgender. She suspends Peri immediately, and decides to resign from Hollyoaks High. After a heart-to-heart with John Paul, Sally decides to remain at the school. She later produces a photograph of John Paul from her desk, and looks at it, smiling.

When laptops are stolen from the school while in John Paul's care, Sally reluctantly suspends him. This infuriates his mother, Myra, who goes to the school and confronts Sally. Myra instantly recognises Sally as Iain, and it is confirmed that Sally is John Paul's father. After a heated argument, Myra demands that Sally never tell John Paul the truth, which she reluctantly agrees to. She continues giving John Paul special treatment at work, leading John Paul to believe that she has feelings for him. When John Paul gets into a fight with Pete Buchanan (Kai Owen) on the school playground, Sally screams that John Paul is her son, stunning everybody. John Paul refuses to speak to Myra or Sally, but slowly warms to Sally when he finds and reads a letter from her which should have been given to him when he was a child, making him more hostile with Myra for withholding it. Myra later demands that Sally pay for all the years of child maintenance that she missed out on for John Paul, which she agrees to do but Myra is still adamant that Sally stays away. As she storms off, she sees red and attacks Sally, resulting in Myra falling down the stairs of the school. The next day, Sally is arrested for attempting to murder Myra, so John Paul hires James Nightingale (Gregory Finnegan) to defend her. She admits to James that she pushed Myra down the stairs in self-defence, but James warns her that if she does not lie to the police, she could be sent to an all-male prison, as she does not have a gender recognition certificate. When Sally eventually confesses to John Paul, he tells her that he wishes she never came back into his life.

Sally later supports John Paul's decision to leave the village for Singapore, however Myra is against it, and falls out with Sally as a result. Sally later offers to help co-parent Myra's newborn daughter, Carmina, however Myra's other daughter Mercedes McQueen (Jennifer Metcalfe) warns Sally off. She later becomes close friends with Neeta Kaur (Amrit Maghera), and this leads to Sally giving her a job at the school as a teaching assistant and them buying a flat together. However, Sally is worried when Neeta decides to move out to reunite with her abusive ex-fiancé, Mac Nightingale (David Easter), who exposes Neeta's affair with student Hunter McQueen (Theo Graham) when Sally learns that Mac has hit Neeta. A gas explosion later rips through Hollyoaks High, trapping Mac, Neeta, Sally, Hunter and other students. Sally and Hunter escape unharmed, however Mac kills Neeta by dropping her from height when the floor collapses. Following Neeta's death, Sally, Hunter and other residents become determined to have revenge on Mac, and after Sally visits him to confront him over Neeta's death, he confesses to killing her before punching Sally to the ground.

Sally later moves in with Myra and the McQueens after a leak at her flat, however Myra later discovers that this was a lie, and that Sally has developed feelings for her. Myra and Sally grow closer and they share a passionate kiss, however Myra instantly regrets this at first and protests to Sally that she is not a lesbian. Myra later declares her love for Sally and they start a relationship, much to the initial disapproval of Myra's mother Nana McQueen (Diane Langton), although she later warms to the relationship. On Christmas Day 2018, Myra proposes to Sally, to which she accepts and they plan for a wedding in March 2019. However, when Myra begins having doubts about the wedding, questioning her sexuality and kissing a DJ the night before the ceremony, Sally decides to call off the wedding, and reluctantly ends her relationship with Myra. As a result, Myra decides that she must leave the village forever to live in Spain with her other daughters, leaving Sally heartbroken.

Sally later meets Finn O'Connor (Keith Rice), who raped John Paul five years ago and takes an instant dislike to him. After Finn visits the school delivering Christmas trees, Sally banishes him from the premises in front of his boss, causing him to lose his job. Edward Hutchinson (Joe McGann) forms an alliance with Sally to plot to drive Finn out of the village, and convinces her to call the police, but Sally and Edward are unaware that Finn's friend Yasmine Maalik (Haiesha Mistry), has overheard their plans. John Paul later returns to the village, delighting Sally.

She later supports her son’s relationship with George Kiss (Callum Kerr), however, she later finds out that he abused John-Paul and kills him in self-defence to protect his cousin, Theresa McQueen (Jorgie Porter) after he attempted to attack her.

Instead, her son was arrested as he was a prime suspect. Sally later learns from Theresa's that she murdered Calvin Valentine (Ricky Whittle) eleven years ago, and because of this, she teams up with her.

== Reception ==
Duncan Lindsay writing for the Metro described Sally as a "refreshing" and "strong teacher" who acts as a "brilliant role model" for the show's audience. The writer was particularly fond of the character's initial storylines and added "definitely one of our favourite new characters this year – long may Mrs. St. Claire reign!" Digital Spy's Kilkelly branded her a "no-nonsense headteacher" and "formidable character". Laura Heffernan from Inside Soap said that "hard-nosed" and "no-nonsense Mrs. St. Claire wasted little time spreading order and discipline throughout Hollyoaks High."

Daniel Kilkelly from Digital Spy included Wallace in a list of the genre's "rising stars". He described the character as "a bit of a nightmare" upon her introduction, due to her ruthless teaching methods. Their opinion changed as Sally continued to appear and Kilkelly stated, "as with all great soap characters, we've since seen her complexities with a much softer and vulnerable side."
