= Scott Drinkwell =

Fictional character from Hollyoaks

- Hollyoaks character
- Portrayed by: Ross Adams
- Duration: 2015–2024
- First appearance: 27 April 2015
- Last appearance: 15 July 2024
- Introduced by: Bryan Kirkwood
In-universe information
- Other names: Anita Tinkle
- Mother: Maggie Kinsella
- Adoptive mother: Lynette Drinkwell
- Half-brothers: Damon Kinsella
- Husband: Mitchell Deveraux (2020–2021)
- Adoptive daughters: Vicky Grant (foster)
- Aunts: Diane Hutchinson (adoptive)
- First cousins: Finn O'Connor (adoptive); Sinead O'Connor (adoptive); Rose Lomax (adoptive); Dee Dee Hutchinson (adoptive); Anthony Hutchinson (adoptive); Lily Drinkwell (adoptive)

Scott Drinkwell (also Drinkwell-Deveraux) is a fictional character from the British soap opera Hollyoaks, played by Ross Adams. The character made his first appearance on 27 April 2015. Producers asked Adams to audition for the role while he was working as a script editor on rival soap opera Emmerdale. The actor forgot his lines during his screen test but was still offered the role. The character was billed as a "troublesome new relative" joining the show's established O'Connor family. He is the cousin of Sinead O'Connor (Stephanie Davis) and nephew to Diane Hutchinson (Alex Fletcher). Executive producer Bryan Kirkwood introduced the character to cause conflict with other characters.

Scott is openly gay and has a "camp and outgoing" personality. His characterisation and loud troublemaking antics have caused controversy with Hollyoaks viewers. The divisive character generated many complaints over concerns that Hollyoaks were stereotyping gay men. Kirkwood released a statement noting the show's history of including a diverse selection of LGBTQ+ characters. He argued that there was no reason not to include a camp gay man after previously representing other personalities. Adams echoed his boss' sentiment and voiced his concern that the soap opera genre had shied away from depicting camp characters.

The character's storylines were originally centric to those featuring Sinead. Following Davis' dismissal from the show, writers began to create stories solely about Scott. He has been involved in storylines including poisoning his aunt Diane, pretending to have HIV, being tricked into kidnapping Rose Lomax by Rose's "mother" Tegan Lomax (Jessica Ellis), was manipulated by James Nightingale (Gregory Finnegan) into ruining his family's restaurant business and finding out that he is adopted. Scott's main relationship has been with John Paul McQueen (James Sutton), which was constantly undermined by James. In 2017, Scott attempted to commit suicide, following a battle with depression. For his portrayal of Scott, Adams has received nominations for "Best Comedy Performance" and "Scene of the Year", as well as winning the award for "Best Male Dramatic Performance". Adams quit the role in 2024 because he wanted to pursue other projects, with Scott's final scenes airing on 15 July 2024.

== Casting ==
In January 2015, Adams was working as a script editor for the British soap opera Emmerdale. A Hollyoaks employee contacted him and invited him to perform a screen test for the role of Scott; Adams thought it was a random offer, but accepted because he considered he had nothing to lose. He later told Dianne Bourne of Manchester Evening News that the screen test went wrong because he was nervous and forgot his lines. He was then offered a one-year contract with Hollyoaks, which left the actor shocked but happy to oblige.

On 20 March 2015, the character and Adams' casting were publicised. Daniel Kilkelly from Digital Spy reported that Scott was a "troublesome new relative" for the show's established O'Connor family. The reporter added that Scott would be "causing mischief" for his cousin Sinead O'Connor (Stephanie Davis). Of his casting Adams said "'I've always admired the bold, brave, stories the programme tells and knowing that I'm going to be part of the team is quite honestly a dream come true." His first scenes as the character were aired in April 2015.

== Development ==
=== Characterisation ===
More blunt than a, err, really blunt thing, Scott causes a commotion wherever he goes. He’s the outrageous, flirtatious, always inappropriate cousin of Sinead; and this terrible twosome love to cause mischief. This out and proud Geordie drama queen lives to shock people with his off-the-cuff one liners and sassy nature, but underneath that seriously tanned exterior is a vulnerable boy desperate for love.

— An excerpt from Scott's biography on the Channel 4 website.

Scott is characterised as a "trouble-maker" with a blunt and outrageous personality. The show's official website describes him as a "drama queen" who enjoys shock value, sass, fake tan and Britney Spears. Adams is required to have an extra deep spray tan each week to achieve Scott's fake tanned appearance. The character also considers himself loyal to his family. The character also has a vulnerable side and wants to feel loved. Adams has described Scott as "loud and proud in every way and he has no filter when it comes to saying what he thinks. Deep down though, his heart is in the right place." The actor later stated that Scott makes "silly choices and silly decisions" but through love writers developed a "softer side" for the character, but now we've seen a softer side to him especially now he's in love and he's with John Paul." Scott is a "party animal" who finds it difficult to hold down a job because he rings in sick. He does not get much sleep as he is a "wild child", Adams added "Scott would never go to bed the same day he woke up."

Scott has a "camp and outgoing" persona and enjoys causing trouble. Adams is openly gay and has stated his belief that is he was not "out" he would not have been able to play Scott in the same way. He noted that while he is not too similar to his character, being open about his sexuality benefited playing those elements that exist in Scott. Scott had a troubled upbringing and found it difficult at school with bullies. This transformed him into a man with "bluster, camp innuendo and OTT humour" to hide his vulnerabilities. He has never had a serious relationship in his life and Adams hoped Scott would find someone to settle down with. Scott can be a "little bit catty and a bit vicious" but behind the façade he has a "good heart" and cares about his family.

=== Introduction ===
Scott arrives in the Hollyoaks village to stay with Sinead. Adams told Bourne that his character formed a double-act with Sinead, who had previously had many "hard-hitting storylines". Adams enjoyed working with Davis on the comedic pairing because of her "infectious personality". Scott causes trouble between married couple Ste Hay (Kieron Richardson) and John Paul McQueen (James Sutton), who live with Sinead. Adams said that his character causes a lot of trouble and warned of much drama.

Scott is hired to work at Hollyoaks High School as a personal assistant for Patrick Blake (Jeremy Sheffield). He is forced to sack Scott following a string of absences. Adams said that the role does not last long because he rings in sick three times despite being well enough to work. Scott learns that Sinead wants to snare Ste from John Paul and decides to help her. He discovers that Harry Thompson (Parry Glasspool) has kissed John Paul, he records a conversation as evidence to show to Ste and ruin his relationship. Ste becomes tired of Scott living in the flat and tries to force him out. Writers displayed the character's scheming side as he makes a revenge plan. Scott floods the flat forcing them all to move out until it is repaired. Davis told Digital Spy's Kilkelly that Scott would then annoy Sinead further by purposely flirting with Ste.

Facing eviction once again from the family home, Scott begins to poison his aunt Diane Hutchinson (Alex Fletcher) with medication. Adams defended his character's actions towards Diane, because Scott is not acting out of malice. He did not intend to hurt or kill her, he wanted her to feel unwell so he had a purpose to stay around and look after her. He wanted to feel "needed and loved" and because of Scott's backstory Adams believed it was genuine. Scott "just does things in the moment that he thinks will help the situation, but invariably it always goes wrong." But when he first read the script he was worried that Scott was being developed into a villainous character.

In July 2015, Davis was fired from Hollyoaks because of her conduct on set. This left Adams worried about his future with the show because the character had been introduced as a character to initially interact in Sinead's stories. Adams and Fletcher (who plays Scott's aunt Diane) were both given time off from the show while new stories were created. Adams said that he had enjoyed working on the double-act with Davis. When he returned to work the character was given stories solely focused on him. The actor added "the audience will maybe see a different side to Scott now."

=== Rose's kidnapping ===
The show created a "baby swap storyline" in which Diane and Tegan Lomax's (Jessica Ellis) daughters were mixed up at birth. Tegan had been raising Rose Lomax unaware that Diane is her biological mother. Dee Dee Hutchinson is the biological daughter of Tegan and they learn the truth that a drunken midwife, Mariam Andrews (Helen Lederer) caused the error. The revelation caused a feud between the Hutchinson and Lomax family as they refused to return the children to their biological parents. Writers devised a subplot in which Rose is kidnapped by a mystery character and Diane framed as the prime suspect.

The show kept the kidnapper's identity a secret until the episode featuring the reveal aired. Scott was shown to be the culprit but appeared to be working with another character. He was shown to be taking good care of Rose, even reassuring his accomplice everything was okay. A publicist from Hollyoaks noted that Scott was the one character no one suspected. The following episode revealed that Scott had no contact with other characters and was unaware of how serious Rose's kidnap had been taken. His naivety is explained when Tegan is revealed to be the instigator of the kidnap plot and had tricked him. Scott believes he is helping a daughter remain in care of their mother.

Adams defended the character and explained that Scott thinks the scam is "perfectly reasonable". He thinks he is helping Tegan and that faking a kidnap is therefore justified. The actor believed his character would not have helped Tegan had he known the severity of the situation. Scott thinks everything is fine and Adams stated that it was an example of Scott being unable to think rationally. Tegan is arrested for the scam and sent to prison. Diane gains temporary custody of Rose. Scott decides to be honest with Diane and apologises for betraying her. Fletcher told Kilkelly that Scott asking for Diane's forgiveness, which she gives to him easily, were "really emotional" scenes.

=== Marnie and James Nightingale manipulation ===
Marnie Nightingale (Lysette Anthony) and her son James (Gregory Finnegan) make a plan to con The Hutch restaurant from Diane and Tony Hutchinson (Nick Pickard). Scott discovers that The Hutch is struggling financially. He offers to do the catering for Jason Roscoe (Alfie Browne-Sykes) and Holly Cunningham's (Amanda Clapham) wedding at a reduced cost of £200, which causes The Hutch to lose money. Diane is furious with Scott and an argument causes Scott to reveal her restaurant is in financial ruin. James and Marnie decide to use his error to their advantage. James decides to fool Scott into believing he is attracted to him, knowing he will be useful to undermine the business. James then convinces Scott to water down Tony's alcohol to save money. He and Marnie then report The Hutch to the Consumer Institute and Tony is fined. The show also used Scott to bring comedy into the storyline. They dressed him as a clown entertaining guests to generate more business. The publicity stunt only serves to bring more financial ruin to the Hutchinson family.

Their manipulation is successful and writers played Scott willing to do anything to impress the duo. Marnie becomes dismayed at the lack of progress in their take over bid. She conjures up a new plan involving Scott. She tells him that an old friend once burned down their business in order to claim on their insurance. Scott believes Marnie and decides it could be the only way to save The Hutch too. Marnie plans to call the police and have Scott arrested for fraud. John Paul McQueen (James Sutton) becomes aware that Marnie has set Scott up and convinces Scott to abort his arson plan and escape the scene before they arrive.

=== Relationship with John Paul McQueen ===
Producers created a romantic relationship storyline for the character alongside John Paul. Adams never expected that producers would ever pair the characters together. He was happy with the development because it was a "strength" pairing to form "the odd couple". The actor told Charlotte Tutton of OK! that "I love us together cause you see a fun side to John Paul, Scott brings out his dry sense of humour, it just works." Adams said that Scott loves John Paul and there would always be something between them. He teased that their relationship would be a "rocky road" full of problems. Scott makes a bold move and asks John Paul to marry him after only dating for a few weeks. The proposal is not well received and a Hollyoaks publicist stated that Scott's lack of relationship experience makes the proposal unsurprising. Scott is a "true romantic", but John Paul cannot believe his boyfriend has acted serious so fast. John Pauls mother Myra McQueen (Nicole Barber-Lane) takes a dislike to Scott. She tries to convince John Paul that he is too good to be with someone like Scott. Myra's words cause John Paul to become ashamed of Scott and embarrassed to be seen with him because of what his friends think.

Scott discovers that John Paul's boss, transgender female Sally St. Claire (Annie Wallace) is John Paul's biological father. Scott decides to keep Sally's secret but when John Paul learns the truth he is angry that Scott was not honest and ends their relationship. Adams told Tutton that it was difficult for Scott to keep the secret and feels guilty. He explained that Scott decided to be honest with John Paul because the guilt became an issue. John Paul immediately receives attention from Scott's enemy James, who charms him and they sleep together. Adams wanted Scott and John Paul to move on from the incident but believed James' presence would always hinder the relationship. The actor also described John Paul as Scott's "first love" and was hopeful for their future, adding "if things go wrong with your first love it takes a lot off forgiving doesn't it so I hope that they can work things out, fingers crossed."

James forces John Paul to pose as his boyfriend at a work related lunch. John Paul cancels plans with Scott, who catches him dining with James and an argument ensues. Rather than attempt to save his relationship, John Paul follows James home for an argument which leads to the pair sleeping together. Sutton told Duncan Lindsay from Metro that John Paul wants to be around James because of the danger and excitement. He likened Scott to a "lost puppy" who is always following John Paul around.

=== Biological mother & half-brother arrival ===
In April 2017 it was announced that Michelle Holmes join the series as the part of Scott storylines of searching his real mother. Speaking about her role, Michelle commented: "It's a pleasure to be working on Hollyoaks and with the hugely talented Ross Adams." Upon the character arrival, Scott meets her when he shows up at the house where his biological mother used to live. Kilkelly (Digital Spy) teased that what Greta tells Scott may or may not help him. She later return as a full-time role. In May, it was announced that Scott half-brother Damon will appear the series with Jacob Roberts cast the role. Roberts expressed his excitement at joining the cast and on his casting, said "I really enjoy playing the role of Damon and I am looking forward to the fans discovering who he really is and who he is connected to in the village".

=== Departure ===
On 17 March 2024, Adams announced that he had decided to leave Hollyoaks after nine years in the role. He released a statement via his Instagram account, revealing that not renewing his contract was "one of the hardest decisions" he had ever made. Adams added the timing was correct because he felt "brave" and wanted to pursue other projects. Daniel Kilkelly from Digital Spy reported that Adams would film his final scenes in May 2024 and were broadcast on 15 July 2024.

== Reception ==
=== Critical analysis ===
For his portrayal of Scott, Adams was nominated for "Best Comedy Performance" at The British Soap Awards 2016. In August 2017, Scott's suicide attempt was longlisted for Best Show-Stopper at the Inside Soap Awards. The nomination did not progress to the viewer-voted shortlist. Lucia Binding writing for International Business Times predicted that Scott and John Paul's relationship would leave viewers "engrossed". She observed the characters taking a "hop, skip, jump and have a little boogie over the fine line between love and hate." Digital Spy's Kilkelly branded the character the "Hollyoaks mischief-maker". Simon Duke writing for the Evening Chronicle branded him "troublesome Scott Drinkwell". An Inside Soap reporter included Scott and Tegan being revealed as Rose's kidnappers; and later Scott trying to burn down The Hutch in their "pick of the day" feature. On 2 June 2018, Adams won the "Best Male Dramatic Performance" award at The British Soap Awards 2018, following his performance during the attempted suicide storyline. In 2019, Laura-Jayne Tyler from Inside Soap praised Scott's drag queen performance, writing, "In the midst of a harrowing week in Hollyoaks, thank goodness for Scott making us smile. He looks great as a blonde!"

A Gay Times writer opined that in a short time Scott "has already helped kidnap a baby, lied about his HIV status and tried to come between lovebirds Ste and John Paul. Tsk tsk." Anthony D. Langford from NewNowNext said Ste believing Scott's HIV lie was a plot device Hollyoaks had "used far too often". They thought it implausible that Ste would believe the lie so soon after Sinead lying about having HIV. Langford, now writing for TVSource Magazine, liked John Paul's chemistry with James. He believed it made Scott's "improbable relationship" with John Paul appear "even more ridiculous". He could not comprehend that John Paul would ever date Scott and called for Hollyoaks to end the "silliness soon". In 2020, Stephen Patterson and Duncan Lindsay from Metro called Scott a "mainstay" and "undoubtedly one of the greatest LGBTQ+ characters the soap genre has ever seen" and noted that the character had had some "incredibly important" storylines, whilst Adams himself revealed that he had received letters from fans who had been able to come out after "resonating with Scott's character".

In 2024, Digital Spy's Kilkelly assessed "Over the years, Scott has become one of Hollyoaks' most popular and versatile characters after taking centre stage in a classic soap mix of comedic and dramatic storylines." He opined that Scott's "storyline highlights" were his "emotional" discovery of his biological family, his marriage to Mitchell and his drag performances. Stephen Patterson from Metro found Scott's 2024 departure emotional, calling the character a "much-loved legend" who had been "a staple" of the soap for nine years.

=== Criticism of camp style ===
"Why shouldn't we have a gay character who's a pain? Scott's loud, brash and unapologetic, we knew he was going to divide the audience, but he doesn't make any apology for who he is. Our show has probably been the best at representing gay people over the years with the likes of John Paul, Ste and Brendan, so why shouldn't we have a gay character who's a pain? Scott’s not here to make a statement – he's here to create conflict among the other characters, and he’s doing that. He's a big, colourful voice, but we will see a vulnerability to his character too."

— Hollyoaks executive producer Bryan Kirkwood defends his show's inclusion of a camp gay character (2015).

The character proved divisive with viewers because of his camp persona and trouble-making ways. Many criticised Hollyoaks for including such a character. The comments provoked the show's executive producer Bryan Kirkwood to release a statement (quoted to the right) about the issue to the British newspaper The Sun defending the character. He noted that Hollyoaks had long represented the LGBT community on the show with different types of characters. He stated that he knew Scott would divide the audience but was not fazed as the show needed a character who caused conflict and happened to be gay.

Adams told Rari Vlad (Gay Times) that the show can influence public perception of the LGBT community. He praised it for having a diverse set of characters including a trans character, lesbians and "masculine" gay characters such as John Paul and Ste. He noted that therefore it was okay for the show to have a camp gay man such as Scott to add to the variety and reflect "different communities" within the LGBT community. He also noted that heterosexual men have different personalities, all represented in soap, so homosexual men with differences should be too.

Adams later compared his character to Sean Tully (Antony Cotton), a character from the rival soap opera Coronation Street. Sean, like Scott, is depicted as a camp gay character. He said it was important for the genre to represent such characters and he noted that there had been a trend in soaps that gay characters were becoming "very straight-acting" and more flamboyant gay characters were becoming invisible. He also acknowledged that newly introduced "larger than life and flamboyant" gay characters "can polarise opinion" and concluded that this was the case with Scott. Adams initially received "awful Tweets" via the social media website Twitter about Scott. In June 2016, the actor said viewers were starting to like his character more because of the relationship with John Paul.
