= Chris Simmons =

English actor (born 1975)

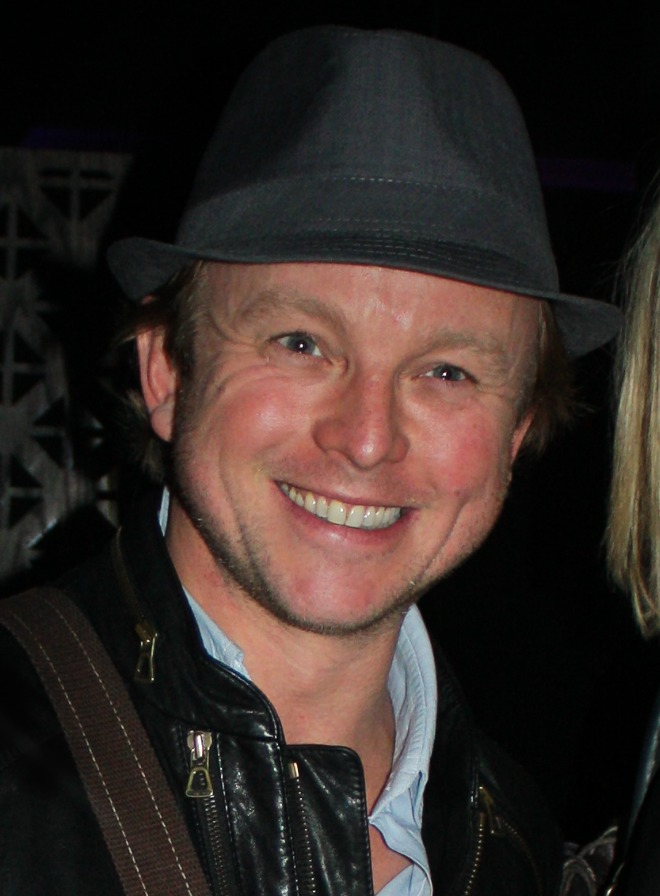
- Born: Christopher Matthew Simmons; 8 January 1975 (age 51); Gravesend, England, United Kingdom
- Occupation: Actor

Christopher Matthew Simmons (born 8 January 1975) is a British television and stage actor from Gravesend, England. He is best known for his roles as DC Mickey Webb in The Bill, Mark Garland in EastEnders and Stuart Summer in Hollyoaks.

== Early life ==
Simmons grew up on Singlewell Road in Gravesend and attended Saint Georges CofE Secondary School. Prior to taking up acting, he had several jobs including working as a diver on the River Thames with his Dad.

== Career ==
Simmons' first television appearance was on the 1998 ITV series Desperately Seeking Stardom, in which a group of unemployed actors went to Hollywood to try to find acting roles.

Simmons found fame as DC Mickey Webb in The Bill from 2000 to 2003 (having previously appeared playing different roles in 1998 and 1999). He made guest appearances over the interim including the live episode in 2003 before returning as a regular in 2005 until the series ended in 2010. He also guest starred in Casualty and Doctors.

In October 2011 he appeared in EastEnders as Mark Garland, a love interest for Kat Moon, for a few episodes. He has since made a guest appearance in the Tracy Beaker spin-off CBBC show, 'The Dumping Ground': In episode 8 of series 1 (1x08), entitled 'Dreamland' he played the father to Rick Barber, Gerry.

Simmons was a patron for the CPC Kent charity until it closed in 2014. He ran the London Marathon in 2009, and again in 2014. In 2013 he took part in the Bupa Great Birmingham Run.

In 2015, he was part of a cast of The Wizard of Oz pantomime at Swallows Leisure Centre, in Sittingbourne.

He also currently works on a youth initiative in his hometown of Gravesend.

In 2019 he was cast as Stuart Sumner in Hollyoaks.

In 2020, he was interviewed alongside his The Bill co-star Sally Rogers for a three-part The Bill Podcast to promote Chris starring in Sally's play The Still Room.

He is also doing safety sketches for the operatives working on the HS2 project.
