= Ross Adams =

English actor (born 1984)

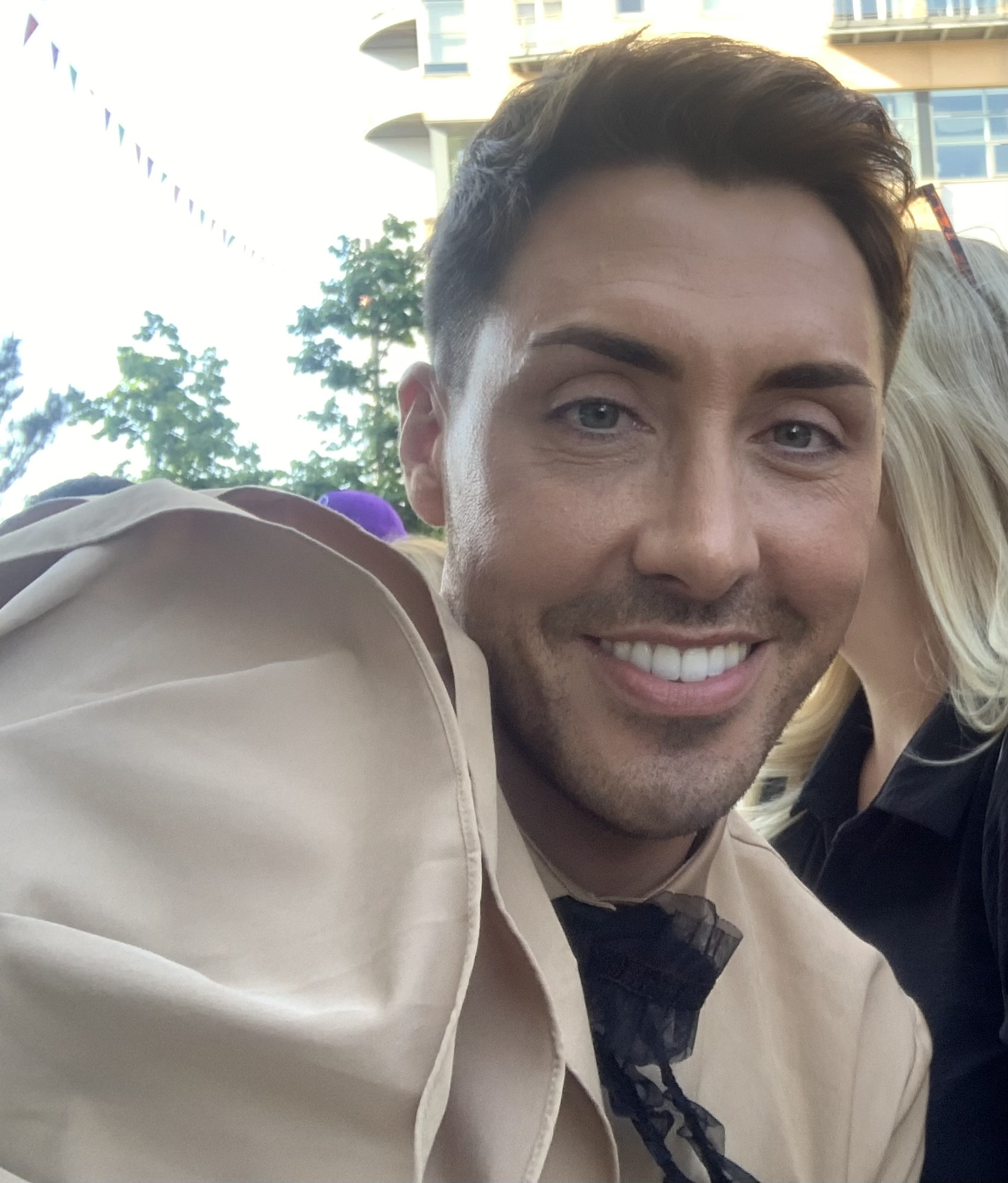
- Adams in 2023
- Born: 5 May 1984 (age 42); Stanley, County Durham, England
- Occupation: Actor
- Years active: 2006–present
- Spouse: Phil Crusham (m. 2018)

Ross Adams (born 5 May 1984) is an English actor, known for playing Scott Drinkwell in the Channel 4 soap opera Hollyoaks from 2015 to 2024, for which he won the British Soap Award for Best Male Dramatic Performance in 2016. Adams has also appeared in the BBC Three sitcom The Gemma Factor and the Channel 5 drama series The Good Ship Murder.

== Life and career ==
Adams was born on 5 May 1984. He moved to Manchester at the age of 18 to study performing arts at the University of Salford. In April 2018, Adams married boyfriend Phil Crusham.

After graduating from university, Adams secured an agent and began making appearances in several television dramas and comedies including Blue Murder, Emmerdale, I'm With Stupid, and Eleventh Hour alongside Patrick Stewart. He also works frequently in the field of voice-overs, having voiced several commercials and documentaries, such as Kellogg's Frosties. Adams was nominated for a RTS Television Award at the Royal Television Society Awards 2010 in the Best Performance in a Comedy category for his role as Jeff Bowyer in the BBC Three sitcom The Gemma Factor.

Adams previously worked as the assistant to the series producer for Coronation Street before moving to Emmerdale as a storyliner. Having written stories for over 400 episodes he then became a script editor. He left the show in February 2015 to commence filming Hollyoaks after he was cast as Scott Drinkwell. He appeared from April 2015 and was awarded the British Soap Award for Best Male Dramatic Performance in June 2018.

In July 2018, Adams made an appearance as a panelist on Love Island: Aftersun alongside Ferne McCann and Danny Jones. In 2024, after nine years on the soap, Adams announced his decision to leave Hollyoaks. His first role following his exit was in the Channel 5 drama series The Good Ship Murder.

== Filmography ==
Year	Title	Role	Notes
2006	Eleventh Hour	Barman	Episode: "Resurrection"
2006	I'm With Stupid	Bobby	Episode: "Games"
2007	The Good Samaritan	Darren Fairclough	Television film
2007	Blue Murder	Mickey O'Higgin	Episode: "Not a Matter of Life or Death"
2009, 2012	Emmerdale	Alex Owen / Police Officer	Guest roles
2010	The Gemma Factor	Jeff Bowyer	Main role
2011	Iconicles	Mungo / Salty (voices)	Recurring roles
2012	Hollyoaks	Journalist	Guest role
2012	Accused	TV Producer	Episode: "Mo's Story"
2012	Doctors	Troy Miller	Episode: "Virtuous Reality"
2012	Hebburn	Jim Carter	Episode: "Feeling Dynamic"
2014	Bait	Letting Agent	Film
2015–2024	Hollyoaks	Scott Drinkwell	Regular role
2025–	The Good Ship Murder	Colin Smallwood	Main role

== Awards and nominations ==
Year	Ceremony	Category	Nominated work	Result	Ref.
2010	Royal Television Society Awards	Best Performance in a Comedy	The Gemma Factor	Nominated	
2016	British Soap Awards	Best Comedy Performance	Hollyoaks	Nominated	
2018	British Soap Awards	Best Male Dramatic Performance	Hollyoaks	Won	
