= Deji =

Dèjì
- Gender: Male
- Language: Yoruba

Origin
- Origin: Yorubaland
- Meaning: Becomes two
- Region of origin: Yorubaland [Nigeria, Benin, Togo]

pronunciation

Deji is a common given name of Yoruba origin which means "becomes two" or "has doubled". Dèjì is most commonly a diminutive form of "Dimeji" or "Dímèjì" which means "has become two".

Other full forms of the name include Adedeji (or Adédèjì) which means "The crown becomes two"; Adè in Yoruba language means "crown".

== Notable people bearing the name ==
=== Sportspeople ===
- Deji Akindele (born 1983), Nigerian basketball player
- Deji Aliu (born 1975), Nigerian track and field sprinter
- Deji Karim (born 1986), American football running back
- Deji Oduwole (born 1987), Canadian football defensive lineman
- Deji Olatoye (born 1991), American football cornerback
- Deji Tobais (born 1991), English track and field sprinter
- Deji Oshilaja (born 1993), English footballer playing as defender

=== Others ===
- Deji Olatunji (born 1996), British YouTuber and brother of KSI

== See also ==
- "Deji" Meets Girl, a Japanese anime television series
