= Oduwole =

Oduwole is a Yoruba surname. It may refer to:

- Deji Oduwole (born August 23, 1987), former gridiron football player
- Zuriel Oduwole (born c. 2002), Nigerian-American film-maker and writer
- Jumoke Oduwole, Nigerian academic and jurist
