= List of Hollyoaks characters introduced in 2015 =

British television soap opera characters

Hollyoaks is a British television soap opera that was first broadcast on 23 October 1995. The following is a list of characters that appeared in the serial in 2015, by order of first appearance. All characters were introduced by executive producer, Bryan Kirkwood.

The first character to be introduced was Dylan Jenkins (James Fletcher) – the estranged son of established character Trevor Royle (Greg Wood), who made his first appearance in early January. Shortly following, in late January, was the younger sister of Porsche (Twinnie-Lee Moore) and Celine McQueen (Sarah George), Cleo (Nadine Mulkerrin). In February, the "Lovedays", a small new family, were introduced, with Simone Loveday (Jacqueline Boatswain) appearing first, followed by the rest of her family – son Zack (Duayne Boachie) and husband Louis (Karl Collins). April saw the arrivals of Reenie McQueen (Zöe Lucker), mother of Porsche, Celine and Cleo and younger half-sister of Myra (Nicole Barber-Lane); brothers Aiden (Joseph Cocklin) and Kyle Bigsby (Mitchell Hunt); Scott Drinkwell (Ross Adams), cousin of Sinead O'Connor (Stephanie Davis) and nephew of Diane O'Connor (Alex Fletcher); and the younger sister of Lindsey (Sophie Austin) and Kim Butterfield (Daisy Wood-Davis), Kath (Mikaela Newton). Cindy Cunningham's (Stephanie Waring) secret husband, Mac Nightingale (David Easter) and Jason Roscoe's (Alfie Browne-Sykes) police mentor, Ben Bradley (Ben Richards) began appearing from May. Dylan's mother, Val Jenkins (Tanya Robb), made her first appearance in June, as did Reenie's sexually abusive ex-boyfriend, Pete Buchanan (Kai Owen), and Sonia Albright (Kiza Deen), the woman pretending to be the missing daughter of Simone and Louis, Lisa.

Ben Bradley's drug-addicted daughter Carly Bradley (Sophie Wise) made her first appearance in July, as did Angela Brown (Adele Silva), her husband, Mark (Ben Faulks) and con artist Wayne (Nathan Whitfield). September saw the introductions of new villainess Ashley Davidson (Kierston Wareing), Derek Clough (Bruce Montague) – the abusive ex-partner of Nana McQueen (Diane Langton) and father of Porsche after raping Reenie, Jade Albright (Kassius Nelson), the sister of Sonia, and Joanne Cardsley (Rachel Leskovac), Louis' former mistress and Simone's former co-worker. October saw Ben's ex-wife, Sadie Bradley (Kirsty Mitchell) introduced and also saw Mac's family introduced as they take over the village pub The Dog in the Pond. The "Nightingales" include Mac's children, Nathan (Jared Garfield), Ellie (Sophie Porley) and Alfie (Richard Linnell); Mac's fiancée Neeta Kaur (Amrit Maghera); and Nathan's fiancée, Rachel Hardy (Jennifer Brooke). October also saw the arrival of new transgender Hollyoaks High headteacher, Sally St. Claire (Annie Wallace). In November, Diego Salvador Hernandez Martinez De La Cruz (Juan Pablo Yepez), Myra's toyboy lover, arrived in Hollyoaks, following her return to the village. In December, new doctor Dr. Berrington (Tupele Dorgu) made her first appearance.

== Dylan Jenkins ==
Dylan Jenkins
- Hollyoaks character
- Portrayed by: James Fletcher
- First appearance: 6 January 2015
- Last appearance: 28 August 2015
- Introduced by: Bryan Kirkwood
In-universe information
- Other names: Dylan Royle
- Occupation: Student
- Father: Trevor Royle
- Mother: Val Jenkins
- Stepmother: Grace Black
- Half-brothers: Curtis Royle
- Grandfathers: Sid Royle
- Grandmothers: Betty Royle
- Other relatives: Celia Royle

Dylan Jenkins (also Royle), played by James Fletcher, made his first screen appearance on 6 January 2015. Dylan is the son of established character, "gangster" Trevor Royle (Greg Wood), who had been rejected by his mother and decided to find his father. A casting call was made for the character on 24 September 2014, revealing the show wanted to cast a "young male actor" that was aged 16 and over to play a "15-year-old emo boy" in a regular role that did not require a specific accent. Auditions were then held for the part of Dylan, with James Fletcher securing the part in 2014. In November 2014, Kirkwood revealed Dylan would become a student of the show's secondary school, 'Hollyoaks High'. Fletcher's casting was announced on 10 December 2014. It was teased whether he would be telling the truth about being Trevor's son. Dylan's first scenes were scheduled to air in January. Fletcher commenting, "Dylan has come to Hollyoaks to find something that's been missing from his life. He hopes he'll find what he's looking for, but it could be a struggle to get what he wants if people keep standing in his way. Deep down Dylan is a good kid who just wants to find his place in the world, but if you cross him he'll make you pay for it. He has secrets but if I told you, they wouldn't be secrets anymore, would they?"

Super smart and mature beyond his years, Dylan isn't your average 15-year-old. He loves to stand out from the crowd with a dash of colour in his jet black hair, and a heavy application of eye-liner. However, acting like an outsider makes him exactly that, and Dylan has a hard time making friends and fitting in.

— Channel4.com on Dylan.

Dylan is 15 years old upon his arrival. He was billed as "a good kid who wants to find his place in the world, but if you cross him he'll make you pay for it." Fletcher described Dylan as "varied", "somebody that isn't run of the mill" and "different". Daniel Kilkelly of Digital Spy described Dylan as an "alternative teen". Executive producer, Bryan Kirkwood also described Dylan as "different". Johnathan Brown of OK! magazine described him as a "troublemaker". Dylan was described as "mysterious" upon his introduction. Dylan arrives in Hollyoaks village on 6 January 2015 when he tells a shocked Peri Lomax (Ruby O'Donnell) that her father, Cameron Campbell (Cameron Moore), is his father. Cameron is confused when Dylan introduces himself, but Trevor corrects him and reveals himself to be Dylan's father.

In an interview with Digital Spy, Fletcher discussed Dylan's cross-dressing storyline, stating how "a lack of a mother figure in his life at the moment" is behind his decision to crossdress. Of Trevor's reaction to Dylan's cross-dressing fun, Fletcher said Trevor "blows up at him" and "Dylan is distraught over Trevor's reaction." Fletcher hopes that story will have a positive impact and that viewers "will just be less judgemental about what people are wearing." He went to mention that Dylan has "nobody to talk to about" his cross-dressing. Fletcher also confirmed that it has been "great fun" to make the transformation to Dylan and his look. On 19 May, it was announced that Dylan's mother, Val Jenkins, would be arriving in the village on 1 June, played by Tanya Robb. It was revealed that Val would arrive after receiving news Dylan had been in a road accident and that Dylan would be happy to see his mother after several months in the village without her. Val would also be seen offering support to her Trevor, to the dismay of Grace who becomes jealous over her presence. It was also announced that Dylan would keep his cross-dressing secret from his mother.

In May 2015, it was announced that Fletcher had chosen to leave his role as Dylan at the end of his contract. Dylan's final scenes were commented to be "a while off", with show bosses promising more drama in the build-up to his exit. Fletcher chose not to comment on his exit, but a Hollyoaks spokesperson said: "Dylan was a popular new addition with the show's young fans, so he definitely won't be leaving quietly. There's a busy few months ahead for him – building up to a memorable exit." Dylan departs on 28 August after being killed off as part of the ongoing "Gloved Hand Killer" storyline. Fletcher spoke to Digital Spy about his exit, stating that he felt his exit storyline was "amazing" and how he "loved that we got to film on location in Sefton Park in Liverpool". When questioned on his reason behind leaving, Fletcher said: "It was one of those things where I went into it and thought, 'I know I don't want to do more than a year'. That was because I'm essentially fresh out of drama school and I didn't train for 4 years to then just do one job." He revealed that he was contracted until late October, but when producers developed this storyline, they went with an early departure. Discussing Kim's visions of Dylan, Fletcher said how they were "great fun": "That was great fun because I got to be scary – it's the closest I've ever got to filming anything with a horror genre. When I saw how they actually make that work when it comes to filming it, you soon find out that it's not scary at all! But hopefully, the thing that ends up on telly will be a bit of a surprise for everyone." Fletcher also stated how it looks that Kim killed Dylan, but he would "love to know who's killed [him]". He also mentioned how pleased he was with the reaction to Dylan's cross-dressing storyline and how it was "fun" to play "such a varied character". Fletcher concluded with the hope that Hollyoaks introduces more "alternative" teenagers to the show in the future.

Dylan arrives in the village believing Cameron Campbell (Cameron Moore) to be his father, until Trevor reveals the truth. Dylan swiftly joins Hollyoaks High School, making friends with Peri Lomax (Ruby O'Donnell), Tom Cunningham (Ellis Hollins) and Nico Blake (Persephone Swales-Dawson). Dylan develops a strong bond with Nico, later entering a relationship with her. He supports and protects Nico from her uncle Will Savage (James Atherton), who is being treated hospital after Nico pushed him off the hospital roof. Dylan, Nico and Tom are stunned to discover that Peri is pregnant and support her, but to cover this, Nico lies that she is pregnant by Dylan. Nico's grandfather Patrick Blake (Jeremy Sheffield) threatens Dylan after discovering Nico's "pregnancy". Dylan later began dressing up in female clothing, first as a fun afternoon with Peri, Tom and Nico where they dress up in wedding attire. However, when Trevor discovers this through a video Peri has uploaded to the internet, he is furious. Dylan's experiences later becomes more serious and begins trying on Trevor's fiancée, Grace Black's (Tamara Wall) make-up, dresses and jewellery. Dylan is later targeted by bullies, Aiden (Joseph Cocklin) and Kyle Bigsby (Mitchell Hunt) for his appearance and personality. Dylan and Nico plot revenge, but it backfires on them when Aiden and Kyle catch them red-handed. Dylan comforts himself by trying on Grace's clothes.

Dylan later goes on a date with Nico, whilst wearing her mother Sienna Blake's (Anna Passey) silk top. Nico tries to undo Dylan's top, but he panics and runs. He is hit by a car driven by Zack Loveday (Duayne Boachie) and is admitted to hospital. Whilst in hospital, nurse Kim Butterfield (Daisy Wood-Davis), who is stalking Grace, discovers his secret and blackmails him, threatening to tell Trevor if he does not put her camera back into the flat. Dylan does so, keeping his secret safe. Dylan is later accused of drugging Nico and planning a sexual assault and despite Nico's pleas to police officer Ben Bradley (Ben Richards), he is nearly charged. In July, Dylan's cross-dressing secret is discovered by Trevor and Grace and react badly. Trevor locks Dylan in the flat, causing an emotional Dylan to tear off his clothes. When Dylan frees himself, he confides in Nico and they take revenge on Trevor by tampering with his car. However, they are shocked to discover that a heavily pregnant Esther Bloom (Jazmine Franks) and her friend, Sinead O'Connor (Stephanie Davis) have used the car for a trip to a spa. Dylan and Nico also vandalise The Loft ahead of its grand re-opening. Trevor later punches Dylan when they have an argument.

Following this, Dylan decides to change his unique look for Trevor's sake. Dylan chooses to stop cross-dressing and select more conventional image. Dylan then tries to be the model son for Trevor, by assisting at The Loft, even trying to get his hands dirty. He impresses Trevor by booking a party at The Loft for Cleo McQueen (Nadine Mulkerrin). Dylan's bad behaviour continues when he supplies Tom with drugs, which causes mischief at Peri's baby scan. Tom's guardian Frankie Osborne (Helen Pearson) discovers where Tom got the drugs and uses this to her advantage in the court case for her granddaughter, Esther's, surrogate child and Grace and Trevor's biological child, Curtis Royle. This annoys Trevor, which makes Dylan feel ashamed. When he sees that Trevor has employed Robbie Roscoe (Charlie Wernham) to sell drugs for him, Dylan becomes jealous that Trevor has not entrusted him to do so. In August, Dylan begins to receive mysterious messages from an unknown person, who is entitled "GothBoy98". Having had an argument with Nico, Dylan turns to "GothBoy98" for support, but becomes spooked when they reveal that they like to wear female clothing. Dylan is then left upset after overhearing Grace tell Trevor to choose between Dylan and Curtis. He does not, however, hears Trevor saying that if Dylan goes, so does he and Dylan swiftly informs Trevor he would be staying with Nico for the night. "GothBoy98" then tells Dylan to get revenge on Trevor, leaving Dylan with ideas in his mind.

Ben, who is currently trying to find evidence to send Trevor to prison after falsely believing that he murdered his daughter Carly Bradley (Sophie Wise), arrives at the flat for a drug search, following a tip-off from Robbie. Dylan then lets slip that he was responsible for the drugs, safely avoiding any trouble for Trevor. Following this, Dylan has a public argument with Nico. Fortunately, Maxine Minniver (Nikki Sanderson) and Scott Drinkwell (Ross Adams) intervene. After taking more advice from "GothBoy98", Dylan frames Trevor by planting drugs in The Loft, before calling the police. However, when he realises his mistake, the police arrive. He swiftly sneaks the drugs from his hiding location, as Trevor offers Dylan papers to change his name from "Dylan Jenkins" to "Dylan Royle", before reminding him that he loves him. As Dylan prepares for his court appearance, Trevor and Grace go after Kim and Esther in an intense car chase for baby Curtis. When Trevor does not show, Dylan ditches the suit Trevor bought him and wears a black dress, whilst re-styling his hair and applying make-up. He is escorted to court by Peri, Tom and Nico and they say their goodbyes before entering court. Dylan is sentenced to six months imprisonment. Meanwhile, Trevor and Grace manage to successfully regain Curtis and when Esther and Kim reverse in their car, a police van collides with their car, causing both vehicles to overturn. Unbeknown to anyone, Dylan is in back of the police van. Trevor tries to save Esther from the wreckage and when he sees Dylan exiting the van, rushes to him. Dylan appears to be fine and assists Trevor. Esther, Grace, Kim, Trevor and Dylan flee the wreckage before it explodes. Shortly after, Dylan collapses in Trevor's arms from a punctured liver.

Dylan is shocked when Kim reveals that she is "GothBoy98" and whilst processing the information, an unknown assailant enters the hospital room, and injects Dylan with a large dose of potassium chloride through his IV drip. Dylan immediately goes into cardiac arrest and despite attempts to resuscitate him, he dies as a devastated Trevor watches on. After Dylan's death, Trevor struggles to cope but when Nico talks to him, Trevor reveals that he was proud of Dylan. He also finally accepts that Dylan liked to wear women's clothing and decides to allow Dylan to be buried in one of his favourite dresses. Nico uses Dylan's mobile phone to stalk "GothBoy98", unaware that it is Kim. Kim starts to experience a guilty conscience over Dylan's death for the stalking, and then starts to hallucinate and sees visions of Dylan. Meanwhile, Nico comes to the conclusion that Dylan's stalker was Kyle and punches him. Kim later reveals the truth to Nico, who tries to get Trevor to hurt her. Trevor breaks up with Grace as he thinks if she did not chase after Esther and Kim in the car, then Dylan would still be alive. In October 2015, it is revealed that Lindsey Roscoe (Sophie Austin) murdered Dylan. After Dylan's death, Trevor is shown to carry a picture of him alongside a picture of Curtis in his wallet. In May 2016, Nico murders Trevor by stabbing him on his wedding day to Grace. The following month, Nico goes to Dylan's grave and confesses that she murdered Carly, Patrick and Trevor, and ask him to forgive her for her killings.

== Cleo McQueen ==
Cleo McQueen, played by Nadine Mulkerrin, made her first screen appearance on 26 January 2015. The concept for the character was announced on 3 May 2014, while details about the character and her name were announced on 26 August and 15 November 2014 respectively. The character has been billed as a "brainbox", and is more softer and sensitive than her older sisters Porsche (Twinnie-Lee Moore) and Celine (Sarah George). Cleo joined Hollyoaks High, and befriended Harry Thompson (Parry Glasspool), Holly Cunningham (Amanda Clapham), and Zack Loveday (Duayne Boachie). In August 2017, Mulkerrin was longlisted for Best Actress at the Inside Soap Awards.

== Simone Loveday ==
Simone Loveday
- Hollyoaks character
- Portrayed by: Jacqueline Boatswain
- Duration: 2015–2019
- First appearance: 20 February 2015
- Last appearance: 23 January 2019
- Introduced by: Bryan Kirkwood
In-universe information
- Occupation: Shop manager (2015–2019)
- Father: Walter Deveraux
- Mother: Gloria Deveraux
- Sisters: Martine Deveraux; Melanie Deveraux
- Husband: Louis Loveday (until 2018)
- Sons: Zack Loveday
- Daughters: Lisa Loveday
- Uncles: Wilfred Deveraux
- Nephews: Mitchell Deveraux; Toby Faroe
- Nieces: Celeste Faroe

Simone Loveday, played by Jacqueline Boatswain, made her first on-screen appearance on 20 February 2015. The basis of the character was announced on 15 November 2014, whilst details about the character, including the name and casting were announced on 10 February 2015. Simone's introductory storyline saw her introduce herself to Cindy Cunningham (Stephanie Waring) and tell her that she is the new boss of Price Slice. She has been billed as a "formidable presence who will quickly make her mark when she takes over at Price Slice."

In November 2015, Simone goes to the doctor and has a blood test. Later on at Price Slice, she receives a phone call from the doctor telling her the results of her blood test. At dinner, when the Lovedays are all together, Simone announces that she is pregnant. However, on Christmas Day 2015, Simone announces that she has suffered a miscarriage. In March 2016, Simone discovers two massive bombshells concerning her "friend" Joanne Cardsley (Rachel Leskovac), she first discovered that she had had sex with her son, Zack (Duayne Boachie) and later discovered that Louis and Joanne had an affair around the time their daughter Lisa (Rachel Adedeji) went missing, causing her to throw Louis out. They later reconcile but they later walk in on Zack and Sonia Albright (Kiza Deen), whom they believe to be Lisa, getting steamy on the sofa, leaving them horrified. She slaps Zack in horror and he blurts out that Sonia is not his sister and not the real Lisa. Simone and Louis later come face to face with Lisa and she lashes out and slaps Margaret, Lisa moves back home with them.

Simone struggles to bond with Lisa who makes life difficult for the Lovedays. Lisa vows to leave Hollyoaks but decides to stay. Lisa is especially jealous of Sonia wanting to make her life hell for imposing her. Lisa persuades Simone to take the business Sonia has away from her. She also forces Simone to choose between her and Zack although Simone does not choose. Lisa is furious when Simone and Louis accept Zack and Sonia's relationship so Lisa begins dating Jesse Donovan (Luke Jerdy). Simone does not approve of the relationship but later makes Lisa the fool when she decides to accept Lisa and Jesse relationship. A new storyline has been teased for Simone for late 2016 as she starts to go drink driving, possibly hinting at an alcoholism storyline. After finding out that Joanne manipulated Margaret into kidnapping Lisa, Simone confronted her at the police station, however, she pulled a knife on Simone and forced her to get her out of the building. They bump into Lisa, who punches Joanne, however Joanne attacks Lisa in retaliation but Simone lunges in front of her, and Simone is subsequently stabbed by Joanne.

== Zack Loveday ==
Zack Loveday, played by Duayne Boachie, made his first on-screen appearance on 24 February 2015. The basis for the character, including the name was announced on 15 November 2014, whilst additional details about the character as well as casting were announced on 10 February 2015. Zack will be an aspiring footballer who joins Hollyoaks High. Zack has also been billed as "full of energy and love", "loves to joke around" and a ladies' man.

== Louis Loveday ==
Louis Loveday
- Hollyoaks character
- Portrayed by: Karl Collins
- Duration: 2015–2019
- First appearance: 3 March 2015
- Last appearance: 22 January 2019
- Introduced by: Bryan Kirkwood
In-universe information
- Occupation: Deputy Headteacher
- Wife: Simone Loveday (until 2018); Martine Deveraux (2018–2019)
- Sons: Zack Loveday; Daniel Lomax
- Daughters: Lisa Loveday

Louis Loveday, played by Karl Collins, made his first on-screen appearance on 3 March 2015. The basis of the character was announced on 15 November 2014, whilst details about the character, including name and casting were announced on 10 February 2015. On 22 January 2019, Louis was killed-off when he was murdered by Breda McQueen (Moya Brady).

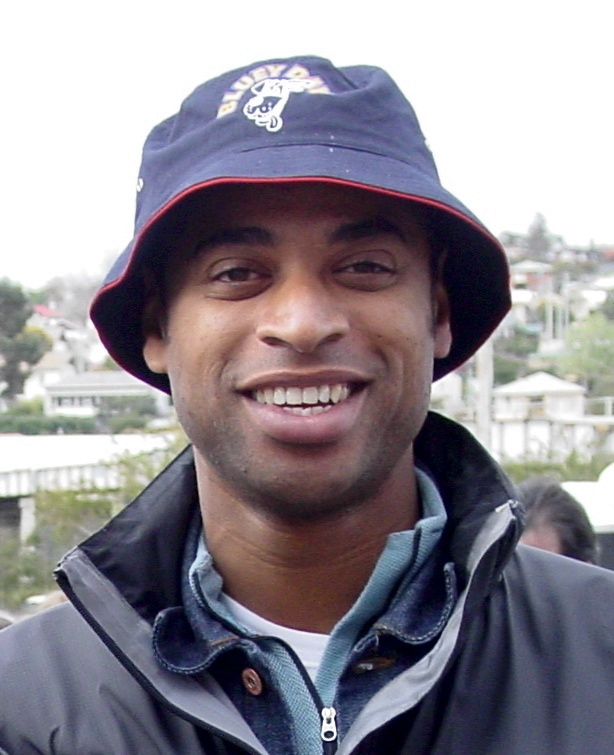
Karl Collins (pictured) portrayed Louis Loveday.

Louis has been billed as a great dad, teacher and cook, as well as letting Simone believe that she is in charge. Louis is the new deputy headteacher at Hollyoaks High. When baby Rose Lomax is kidnapped, the suspicion turns to Louis after finding a file with pictures of local girls unaware that the file belongs to his wife Simone Loveday (Jacqueline Boatswain) who is searching for their daughter Lisa (Rachel Adedeji), Louis is arrested therefore making Simone admit the truth.

In November 2015, it is discovered that Simone is pregnant, however, on Christmas Eve, they reveal Simone has suffered a miscarriage. In March 2016, Simone discovers Louis' affair with Joanne Cardsley (Rachel Leskovac), resulting in her throwing them out and them arguing on several occasions, but Simone later decides to give their marriage another chance, but they walk in on their son Zack (Duayne Boachie) and Sonia Albright (Kiza Deen) and are disgusted. They are left gobsmacked to discover that Sonia is not the real Lisa. They come face to face with Lisa at the police station and she returns home with them, however, he and Simone struggle to bond with her.

In September 2016, Louis worries for his friend, Nancy Osborne (Jessica Fox) when her leg freezes at the school, resulting in him taking her to the hospital, but she later leaves, insisting she is fine. In December 2016, Louis is revealed to be the father of Leela Lomax's (Kirsty-Leigh Porter) son, Daniel. Zack and Leela have a relationship and Louis is unhappy but he tried to make amends with Zack but Zack is not pleased when he shows up at the Lomax house. Louis still wants to be a part of Daniel's life.

In January 2019, Louis is killed by Breda McQueen (Moya Brady) after she had injured him and moved him to an abandoned pig farm to convalesce but killed him when she discovered that he knew that she had murdered three other men and had just been telling her what she wanted to hear by saying his future was with Leela and Daniel and that he loved them when it was actually Simone that he loved. Breda angrily bludgeons Louis with a phone and later burns Louis's clothes and mobile phone. In August 2019, Louis' body is found in the village pond, having been moved from its original burial site at Breda's pig farm.

In August 2017, the revelation that Louis is Daniel's father was longlisted for Best Shock Twist at the Inside Soap Awards. The nomination did not progress to the viewer-voted shortlist.

== Reenie McQueen ==
Reenie McQueen
- Hollyoaks character
- Portrayed by: Zöe Lucker
- Duration: 2015–2016
- First appearance: 16 April 2015
- Last appearance: 30 June 2016
- Introduced by: Bryan Kirkwood
In-universe information
- Other names: Reenie Buchanan-McQueen
- Occupation: Barmaid
- Family: McQueen
- Mother: Marlena McQueen
- Half-brothers: Louis McQueen
- Half-sisters: Myra McQueen; Kathleen McQueen
- Husband: Pete Buchanan (2015–2016)
- Daughters: Porsche McQueen; Celine McQueen; Cleo McQueen
- Grandsons: Joseph McQueen
- Granddaughters: Joseph McQueen
- Nephews: Niall Rafferty; John Paul McQueen
- Nieces: Mercedes McQueen; Theresa McQueen; Jacqui McQueen; Carmel McQueen; Michaela McQueen; Tina Reilly; Carmina McQueen
- First cousins: Breda McQueen
- Other relatives: Phoebe McQueen (adoptive); Kathleen-Angel McQueen; Matthew McQueen; Goldie McQueen; Prince McQueen; Hunter McQueen

Reenie McQueen (also Buchanan-McQueen) played by Zöe Lucker, made her first on-screen appearance on 16 April 2015. The character and casting was announced on 6 February 2015. Reenie is the daughter of Nana McQueen (Diane Langton), and the mother of Porsche (Twinnie-Lee Moore), Celine (Sarah George) and Cleo McQueen (Nadine Mulkerrin). Reenie has been billed as "good-time party girl without an "off" switch and can be exhausting company although deep down she is the most vulnerable of Nana's children" and has not set the best example to her children and has let them down in the past. Reenie's introductory storyline saw her be visited by Porsche in prison.

Reenie first appears when Porsche visits her in prison, after receiving a visiting order from her. Porsche is very hostile towards Reenie, as she refused to believe her when Porsche told her about her ex-boyfriend, Pete Buchanan's (Kai Owen), sexual abuse of her. Reenie asks Porsche for £5,000 so she can rebuild her life when she gets out of prison, but Porsche only manages to raise £2,000. Reenie accepts it reluctantly and asks Porsche about Celine and Cleo before she storms out. Reenie is later seen moving into a cell with Grace Black (Tamara Wall), and makes life very difficult for Grace as she is in prison for the suspected murder of her niece, Mercedes McQueen (Jennifer Metcalfe). She teases Grace when Kim Butterfield (Daisy Wood-Davis) is moved to the prison and notices the pair's closeness. After confronting Kim, she spikes Reenie's drink with laxatives, which she has a bad reaction to, and ends up in hospital. She calls Porsche and she visits Reenie, and asks her for the remaining amount of money that she owes her. Porsche says she will give Reenie the money when she swears she will stay away from the McQueen family. Reenie continues to pressure Porsche into raising the outstanding money, which eventually leads to Porsche being arrested. Later that day, Reenie phones the McQueen household from prison and talks to Cleo. She asks Cleo whether she would like to move in with her and Pete when she is released, leaving Porsche in despair.

Porsche and Celine are desperate for Cleo to stay in the village, so Porsche visits Grace and pleads with her to set Reenie up. After talking to her boyfriend Harry Thompson (Parry Glasspool), Cleo decides she is going to stay in the village, however, she wants Reenie to move in with them. Porsche then reveals to Celine that she has asked Grace to set Reenie up, which she is not happy about. Grace plants drugs in Reenie's make-up bag and she is told she will not be allowed an early release. Porsche reveals this to Celine and Cleo, which Cleo is upset about. At the end of May 2015, Porsche and Celine are stunned when Reenie arrives at the McQueen household, which delights Cleo. Nana and Cleo want Reenie to stay, however, Porsche and Celine try and persuade her to leave the village. She ignores her daughters, and invites her family to a meal at The Dog in the Pond public house, where Reenie states that Porsche is a "tease", referring to Porsche's accusations against Pete. She shouts at Reenie aggressively, before being told to leave by Nana and Cleo. When Porsche is attacked by Trevor Royle (Greg Wood), Reenie intervenes and gives him money to leave her alone. Porsche then tells her mother that she wants to help her rebuild her life, however, she later breaks into Price Slice dressed as Reenie and steals bottles of wine. She is arrested, but Cleo provides her with an alibi. When Pete arrives in the village, Porsche moves out of the family home because they all believe Reenie and Pete over her.

Unknown to everybody, but Pete has also begun sexually abusing Cleo, too. Reenie is upset when Porsche shouts at her over family member Phoebe McQueen's (Mandip Gill) death, and exclaims that she wishes that she was dead instead of Phoebe. Reenie is later furious when she walks in on Pete and Porsche arguing, and Pete lies saying that Porsche tried to kiss him again, and Reenie again believes Pete over her daughter. Porsche makes numerous scenes at Phoebe's funeral over Pete's abuse of her, but this eventually leads to Nana exiling Porsche from the family, as Pete paid for Phoebe's funeral. Later that day, Cleo refuses to be intimate with Pete anymore, which leads to Pete ending his relationship with Reenie and him leaving the village. She gets drunk, and staggers into Cleo's classroom, angrily demanding money for some alcohol. The next day, Cleo locks Reenie in her bedroom, and she vows never to drink again. However, later that day, Cleo sees an empty bottle of wine on Reenie's bed, and her mother is nowhere to be seen. It later transpires that Reenie is in a drunken state and constantly leaving Pete messages on his phone to come home. When she later sees a van resembling Pete's, Reenie stumbles into the middle of the road, only to be hit by a car. She is rushed to hospital and later recovers. In order to pay for Cleo's party celebrating her exam results, Reenie begins flirting with Dr. Charles S'avage (Andrew Greenough) and goes out with him on several occasions. However, Dr. S'avage's overbearing friend, Sienna Blake (Anna Passey), is aware of Reenie's scheming, and after exchanging insults during an argument over Dr. S'avage, Sienna pushes Reenie down the city stairs. After recovering in hospital, Reenie gets drunk and slaps Sienna for trying to kill her, and after attacking her, Reenie is arrested and kept in police custody for ABH. Upon her release, Pete proposes to Reenie, and she accepts; unaware that his real intention is to stay close to Cleo.

In September 2015, Reenie is shaken by the appearance of Nana's ex-boyfriend, Derek Clough (Bruce Montague), who used to physically abuse Nana when they were younger. Reenie continuously causes arguments between her, Nana and Derek, which worsen when they announce they are engaged after Derek reveals he is dying. Reenie goes out on a pub crawl in an attempt to get over her pain, but when she returns, she attempts to smother Derek with a pillow, but is caught by Nana. The following night, as Nana and Derek celebrate their engagement, Reenie reveals that Derek repeatedly raped her when she was a teenager. She continues to reveal that she fell pregnant by Derek, resulting in the birth of Porsche, however, everybody assumed that Porsche's father was a boy named Mickey. She swears Nana to secrecy, and when they return downstairs, they watch as Derek collapses and dies of a heart attack. Reenie grabs the telephone to call for an ambulance, but Nana stops her and holds her hand as they watch Derek die.

Reenie later helps Mercedes at the funeral of her son Gabriel, who was stillborn. After the funeral, Cleo threatens to tell Reenie about her relationship with Pete, however Pete nastily lies that Reenie is dying from breast cancer. Cleo later realises that Pete has been lying, and threatens to tell Reenie again, however Pete viciously tells her that the entire family will not believe Cleo. On the day of Pete and Reenie's wedding day, after witnessing Pete and Cleo talking in the alleyway, Harry guesses that they are in a relationship, and storms into the ceremony, exposing Pete as a paedophile to the entire family. Reenie initially refuses to believe Harry, Porsche or Cleo, but when her sister Myra McQueen (Nicole Barber-Lane) reveals she has noticed Cleo acting strangely for the past few days, and after Porsche shows her messages Pete has been sending to local schoolgirl Jade Albright (Kassius Nelson), Reenie finally sees Pete as a paedophile and throws him out. The day after the wedding, Reenie and Porsche give statements to the police about Pete, however, Cleo refuses to. Reenie gets drunk and reveals to Myra that Derek did to her what Pete has done to Porsche and Cleo. She is then upset when Darren Osborne (Ashley Taylor Dawson) blames her for Pete's messages to Jade. Later that day, Pete is run over by an unknown assailant in one of Darren's taxis. The police arrest Darren for the hit-and-run, however when Reenie visits Pete in hospital, it transpires that she tried to kill him, and Pete then threatens to call the police on her if she does not drop the charges of sexual abuse against him. After Celine threatens him, Pete informs the police that Reenie was behind the hit-and-run, and she is subsequently arrested. She confesses to the crime and is released on bail, however Cleo and Porsche are both furious with Reenie over her actions.

The next day, Harry informs Reenie and Celine that Cleo has been visiting Pete in hospital, and tells them that she possesses a mysterious key of Pete's. They track Cleo down to a lock-up that Pete had bought so he could keep all of the love letters, photographs and memories that he shared with Porsche, Cleo and Jade, however in order to protect Pete, Cleo sets fire to the lock-up, destroying all evidence. After realising that Pete also has feelings for Jade as well as herself, Cleo confesses to the McQueens that she began a sexual relationship with Pete when she was 13 years of age, and makes a statement to the police, and Pete is therefore arrested. Reenie is later shaken when she and Porsche receive letters from Derek's solicitors revealing that he has left them both something in his will. Myra convinces Reenie to dispose of the letters and forget about Derek, however, Porsche finds the letters and is confused as to why Derek has left her something in his will. After being encouraged by Lockie Campbell (Nick Rhys) to see what Derek has left her, Porsche is ecstatic to learn he has left her £10,000. When Porsche tells Reenie of her inheritance, she is clearly upset and Porsche asks her why she hated Derek so much. Reenie then reveals to Porsche that Derek inappropriately touched her and raped her as a teenager, and after Porsche apologises for taking Derek's money, Reenie finally reveals the truth to Porsche that Derek was her father, leaving Porsche devastated. The following day, Porsche confronts Reenie in Price Slice, and vents her anger out on her, realising the reason why Reenie was so cold with her as a child was because of Derek. Upset at her remarks, Reenie angrily slaps Porsche, however, this results in a physical fight in the shop. Tegan Lomax (Jessica Ellis) calls a police officer over to intervene in the catfight, but Reenie accidentally slaps him as he breaks it up. Reenie then flees the shop, and confides in Theresa McQueen (Jorgie Porter) that she is going straight back to prison because of the assault. Desperate for the pair to talk again, Myra locks Porsche and Reenie in her bedroom, where Reenie explains to Porsche that she hated the thought of having Derek's child, however when she kicked for the first time, she fell in love with her and fought to keep her when Nana tried to give her up for adoption. Porsche then forgives Reenie for everything that has happened with Pete and Derek and attempts to persuade Reenie to go with her as she plans to leave the village. However, as she is about to leave with Porsche, Cleo emphasises how much she needs her mother during Pete's trial, so when the police arrive to arrest her, Reenie does not resist as she states that being a jailbird mother is better than not being a mother at all.

Cleo visits Reenie in prison after she was remanded in custody. Reenie discusses with Cleo about Pete changing his statement about her attempted murder charge. Reenie starts getting suspicious and asks Cleo if she has been seeing Pete. Cleo lies by saying she has not seen him, and Reenie says that she knows what Pete is capable of.

Reenie returns from prison in June 2016, the week before Pete's trial. She is thrilled to see Celine and Mercedes, however is upset when Cleo distances herself from her. She is stunned when Mercedes reveals that Myra has fallen down the stairs and is pregnant, and is refusing to have an operation to prevent paralysis due to the risks it has to the baby. Reenie visits Myra, and after discussing the matter with her, Myra decides to go through with the surgery. Reenie is devastated when Cleo orders her to stay away from court and that she wishes she wasn't her mother, and she contemplates drinking a bottle of wine outside The Dog after several months of being sober. However, Cleo's best friend, Holly Cunningham (Amanda Clapham), convinces Reenie not to drink the alcohol and support Cleo, regardless of her orders. She is later furious when it transpires that Cleo has been covering for Holly over the car accident that killed Rachel Hardy (Jennifer Brooke), making Cleo seem like an unreliable witness. When Reenie gives evidence against Pete during the trial, she breaks down in the dock as she confesses that she missed the signs that Cleo was being sexually abused by Pete because she was drunk most of the time. As she leaves the dock, she attacks Pete with a glass, threatening to kill him for what he has done to her daughters, before being escorted out by security. Reenie is remanded in custody and sent back to prison for attacking Pete, but is relieved to hear that Pete has been found guilty of sexual activity with a child and child grooming. Cleo visits her the following day, and Reenie apologises for being a rubbish mother while Cleo apologises for all the horrible things she has said to her in the past. Reenie emphasises how proud she is to call herself Cleo's mother, and makes Cleo promise to start fresh in her life now that Pete has gone. She is then escorted back to her cell, but as Cleo waves her goodbye, Reenie breaks down in tears.

== Scott Drinkwell ==
Scott Drinkwell, played by Ross Adams, made his first screen appearance on 27 April 2015. The concept of the character was announced on 16 November 2014, while details about the characters, such as name, casting and personality were announced on 20 March 2015. Scott is Sinead O'Connor's (Stephanie Davis) cousin. Scott has been described as "gay and will become the playful devil on Sinead's shoulder once he settles into life in Chester." His attempts to keep his cousin happy may also cause trouble for Ste Hay (Kieron Richardson) and John Paul McQueen's (James Sutton) marriage.

== Kath Butterfield ==
Kath Butterfield
- Hollyoaks character
- Portrayed by: Mikaela Newton
- Duration: 2015–2016
- First appearance: 27 April 2015
- Last appearance: 19 May 2016
- Introduced by: Bryan Kirkwood
In-universe information
- Sisters: Lindsey Butterfield; Kim Butterfield

Kath Butterfield, played by Mikaela Newton, made her first on-screen appearance on 27 April 2015. The character and casting was announced on 24 April 2015. Kath is Lindsey Butterfield's (Sophie Austin) younger sister and Kim Butterfield's (Daisy Wood-Davis) twin sister who is in a care home due to suffering brain damage at an early age. It has been reported that Kim is closer to Kath than Lindsey is.

In September 2015, it was explained that Lindsey caused Kath's brain damage after she was digging her nails into her skin and she accidentally pushed her into the lake. She last appeared when Kim impulsively visited her at the care centre. Lindsey arrived to calm Kim down and Kim was arrested for causing a public disturbance. Lindsey later revealed that she pushed Kath into the river in a bid to kill her because she blamed Kath for all the problems in her life. Kim's wife, Esther Bloom (Jasmine Franks), later reads to Kath at the care home and while she is visiting, Esther shows Kath a picture of Lindsey, which makes Kath scared.

== Aiden and Kyle Bigsby ==
Aiden Bigsby and Kyle Bigsby
- Hollyoaks character
- Portrayed by: Joseph Cocklin (Aiden); Mitchell Hunt (Kyle)
- First appearance: 29 April 2015
- Last appearance: 30 July 2015 (Aiden); 10 November 2015 (Kyle)
- Introduced by: Bryan Kirkwood
In-universe information
- Occupation: Students

Aiden Bigsby, played by Joseph Cocklin, and Kyle Bigsby, played by Mitchell Hunt, made their first appearances on 29 April 2015. The characters and casting details were announced on 12 March 2015. Aiden and Kyle are introduced when they cross paths with Harry Thompson (Parry Glasspool) and Zack Loveday (Duayne Boachie) on the school football team.

Aiden and Kyle subject Dylan Jenkins (James Fletcher) to a campaign of bullying and beat up Ste Hay (Kieron Richardson) in a homophobic attack. They are reported to the police by Zack and is arrested and charged with actual bodily harm. Kyle later blackmails Harry into stealing exam paper answers for him. When Harry is late for giving the papers to him, Kyle sends his girlfriend, Cleo McQueen (Nadine Mulkerrin), footage of Harry in a gay bar and reveals his homosexuality. Cleo is infuriated and believes that Harry has betrayed her. Kyle then hosts two parties with drugs which Kyle believes are legal highs but are in fact illegal. Kyle tries to kiss Holly Cunningham (Amanda Clapham) but Holly lashes out and runs out. A few weeks later, Kyle encourages Holly to take legal highs again. However, when Jason Roscoe (Alfie Browne-Sykes) finds out about Kyle giving her the drugs and attempting to kiss her, he arrests him on a sexual assault charge.

== Mac Nightingale ==
Mac Nightingale
- Hollyoaks character
- Portrayed by: David Easter
- Duration: 2015–2019
- First appearance: 13 May 2015
- Last appearance: 21 March 2019
- Introduced by: Bryan Kirkwood
In-universe information
- Occupation: Pub owner
- Wife: Marnie Nightingale (backstory); Cindy Cunningham (2015–2016)
- Sons: James Nightingale; Nathan Nightingale; Alfie Nightingale
- Daughters: Ellie Nightingale; Juliet Nightingale
- Grandsons: Romeo Nightingale
- Aunts: Violet Nightingale

Mackenzie "Mac" Nightingale, played by David Easter, made his first on-screen appearance on 13 May 2015. The character and casting was announced on 12 May 2015. Mac is introduced as Cindy Cunningham's (Stephanie Waring) secret husband, who she had married off-screen during one of her bipolar episodes. It was later revealed that Mac would be part of the new Nightingale family, who would arrive and take over The Dog in the Pond. Mac has been billed as "the kind of landlord everyone wants a pint with" and that he "oozes style and roguish charm", as well as the fact that "he'll go to the ends of the earth to protect his family." Mac made his first regular appearance on 23 October 2015, which also marked the 20th anniversary of Hollyoaks. He departed the show on 4 December 2017 when all his evil deeds were exposed. He returned briefly in May and July 2018, before making a permanent return in September 2018. Easter quit the role in early 2019 and his final scenes aired on 21 March 2019 when he was killed off.

Mac is first seen when he arrives on Cindy Cunningham's doorstep to ask for a divorce. Cindy, who is bipolar, had married Mac during one of her manic episodes. This is especially problematic since Cindy later married Dirk Savage (David Kennedy), making her a bigamist. Months later, Mac moves to Hollyoaks to take over The Dog in the Pond pub. His father was the original owner and named the pub in honour of Mac's childhood dog. Mac moves in with his fiancée, Neeta Kaur (Amrit Maghera), his children Nathan (Jared Garfield), Ellie (Sophie Porley), and Alfie (Richard Linnell), and Nathan's fiancée, Rachel Hardy (Jennifer Brooke). Mac reveals to Nathan that Alfie, who was believed to be Mac's adopted son, is, in fact, his biological son with Cindy. It turns that years before their marriage, the two of them had a fling in Spain, which resulted in Cindy getting pregnant. After finding out Alfie was in foster care, Mac convinced his then-wife Marnie (Lysette Anthony) that they should adopt him. Mac decided to move to the village so Alfie could get to know his biological mother.

On Mac and Neeta's wedding day, Cindy reveals that she and Mac are still married. Cindy wants a divorce settlement from Mac, but he refuses to give her a penny. Mac is surprised when his oldest son, James (Gregory Finnegan), turns out to be Cindy's divorce lawyer. It is clear that Mac and James have an antagonistic relationship. His ex-wife, Marnie, also arrives and wants the settlement from Mac that she never got. Nathan lets it slip that Alfie is Mac and Cindy's son and Marnie announces it publicly. Marnie schemes to break Mac and Neeta up, but Mac does not fall for any of it. Mac gets into an argument with James on his second wedding day to Neeta and punches him in the abdomen, which is witnessed by John Paul McQueen (James Sutton). Neeta calls off the wedding when she sees bruises on Mac's hands, realising that he will never stop his violent ways. James confides in John Paul that Mac physically abused him when he was child. After the wedding, Mac sleeps with Marnie and when Neeta finds out, she finishes their relationship for good. Mac and Marnie decide to give their relationship another go.

During a robbery, Mac is locked in the cellar with Nathan's girlfriend, Lisa Loveday (Rachel Adedeji), and the pair have sex. They begin an affair, but Lisa feels guilty and ends it. After some time, Lisa and Mac start their affair again and leave town in a caravan. While driving back they accidentally hit Cameron Campbell (Cameron Moore). Mac tells Lisa they cannot help him or their affair will be revealed so they leave him on the road. Lisa gets back together with Nathan and they get engaged. At their engagement party, Mac tells Lisa he is in love with her, they kiss and Nathan walks in. Mac and Nathan have an altercation and Nathan falls out of a window to his death. Mac is heartbroken to lose his son. Marnie is disgusted to uncover his affair with Lisa and vows revenge.

Marnie and James try to trick Mac into believing he has Alzheimer's disease. Mac uncovers their scheme and banishes both of them from his life. Mac reconciles with Neeta. When Mac uncovers Neeta's affair with her student, Hunter McQueen (Theo Graham), he forces her to end it or he will turn her in to the police. Mac becomes increasingly possessive and controlling towards Neeta. Mac is infuriated when Hunter reveals his affair with Neeta in front of everyone at Hollyoaks High. Mac sets fire to a picture Hunter had given Neeta and it accidentally lands on a gas leak that sets the school on fire. Mac saves Neeta from falling through a floor, but when Neeta shouts to Hunter that she loves him, Mac cruelly releases her hand. Neeta dies shortly afterward in hospital. Mac covers his tracks so he is not linked to the fire. Jack Osborne (Jimmy McKenna) sees a burn on the side of Mac's body and guesses that Mac started the fire. Mac beats Jack unconscious and leaves him for dead. When Jack awakens, all of Mac's misdeeds are finally revealed. When James confronts him, Mac violently attacks him as Ellie and Marnie walk in. Ellie, who previously did not believe that Mac had abused James, is horrified and attacks her father, leading to him accidentally falling out of the same window Nathan fell out of. The fall gives Mac locked-in syndrome: he is alive, but cannot move any part of his body. Mac is then transferred to a care home. Months later, James pays Mac a visit, where he tears into his father for abusing him and making him sleep with a female prostitute on his sixteenth birthday "to turn him straight." James kisses his boyfriend, Kyle Kelly (Adam Rickitt), in front of Mac and tells him he is nothing like him and never will be.

In a series of flashbacks, details of Mac's ugly history with James are revealed. Mac had paid a prostitute named Donna-Marie Quinn (Lucy-Jo Hudson) to sleep with a sixteen-year-old James after finding out he tried to kiss another boy. It is revealed that James had gotten Donna-Marie pregnant and, many years later, Donna-Marie blackmailed Mac and Marnie for £100,000 to keep quiet about her son, Romeo (Owen Warner). To get the money, Mac lied to James that his business was struggling so James embezzled the money from the law firm he worked for.

Later in the year, Mac makes a recovery. Mac asks his family for a second chance, but only Alfie is willing to give him one. Ellie is arrested for attacking Mac, but she is later released and leaves town. Mac moves back to the village and convinces Cindy to let him move into her house. It soon becomes apparent Mac has not changed his evil ways and is plotting his revenge. Mac becomes reacquainted with Donna-Marie and lets her move into the house along with Romeo and her daughter, Juliet (Niamh Blackshaw). Mac and Donna-Marie switch Cindy's bipolar medication with vitamins. Mac also tricks Cindy into signing her house over to him. Cindy is put into psychiatric care, but she is released when Romeo reveals what Mac and Donna-Marie have done. James helps Cindy take out a lawsuit against Mac for what he has done to her. Mac is shocked when Donna-Marie tells him he is Juliet's father, but he is happy he has the chance to be a father again. With Cindy's lawsuit looming, Mac decides to get rid of James once and for all. After discovering Breda McQueen (Moya Brady) murdered Louis Loveday (Karl Collins), he blackmails her into murdering James. When Breda poisons James, Mac celebrates his victory. However, Breda confesses that James is still alive, that she never intended to kill him, and that she has poisoned Mac. Mac attacks Breda and she hits him over the head. Mac dies on the steps of the Cunningham house.

== Hannah Hay-O'Connor ==
Hannah Hay-O'Connor
- Hollyoaks character
- Portrayed by: Uncredited (2015); Maddison Allen (2018–2019)
- Duration: 2015, 2018–2019
- First appearance: 21 May 2015
- Last appearance: 18 September 2019
- Introduced by: Bryan Kirkwood
In-universe information
- Father: Ste Hay
- Mother: Sinead O'Connor
- Stepfather: John Paul McQueen; Harry Thompson; James Nightingale
- Half-brothers: Lucas Hay
- Half-sisters: Leah Barnes (adoptive); Katy O'Connor
- Grandfathers: Danny Lomax; Rob O'Connor
- Grandmothers: Pauline Hay; Morag Fairhurst; Diane Hutchinson (adoptive)
- Uncles: Finn O'Connor
- Aunts: Leela Lomax; Tegan Lomax; Olivia O'Connor
- First cousins: Peri Lomax; Bella Sharpe; Dee Dee Hutchinson; Daniel Lomax; Noah Dexter; Clara Dexter
- Other relatives: Steph Cunningham-Lomax

Hannah Katy Hay-O'Connor is the daughter of Sinead O'Connor (Stephanie Davis) and Ste Hay (Kieron Richardson). She was born on 21 May 2015, leaving later that year. Hannah returned on 8 October 2018, with her mother.

Hannah was produced on a one-night stand between her parents, Sinead and Ste, whilst Ste was in a relationship with John-Paul McQueen (James Sutton). When Sinead discovers she is pregnant, she did not know who the father is, due to her affair with Tony Hutchinson (Nick Pickard). Her stepmother Diane thinks it is his, causing herself to separated with Tony, until Sinead reveals that Ste is the father during his and John-Paul's wedding, shocking the entire McQueens and her family. With the help of John-Paul, she and Ste decide to raise their child together, until Sinead ends this, upon discovering that Ste has HIV.

However, she changed her mind and allowed Ste to be part of Hannah's life, until she discovers his affair with Harry Thompson (Parry Glasspool), causing herself and Hannah to leave the village. Three years later, she returns to the village and allows Ste once again to be with Hannah, however upon discovering that he joins the Far-Right group, she bans him until he leaves the group. She later leaves with her mother after her father arrested. A year later after her father leave the group due to Stuart death and Jonny arrested, Sinead allowed Ste to see her anytime he wants along with his other children upon learning that the two men used him to against her former fiancé Sami and his family.

== Ben Bradley ==
Ben Bradley, played by Ben Richards, made his first on-screen appearance on 26 May 2015. Ben is a police sergeant who tries to help Jason Roscoe (Alfie Browne-Sykes) join the police force, by acting as his "mentor". Ben is also introduced as a love interest for Sienna Blake (Anna Passey), however, a spokesperson said that "Ben seems not to have been completely truthful about his past and is making a big mistake if he thinks this will slip past Sienna." Ben first appears investigating Dylan Jenkins' (James Fletcher) hit-and-run accident, which Jason was involved in. Richards later departed the role and made his last appearance on 27 May 2016.

== Val Jenkins ==
Val Jenkins, played by Tanya Robb, made her first on-screen appearance on 1 June 2015. The character and casting was announced on 19 May 2015. Val is Dylan Jenkins' (James Fletcher) mother and arrived in the village after hearing the news of her son being hit by a car. She also comforts Trevor Royle (Greg Wood) after learning that Esther Bloom (Jazmine Franks) has decided against giving him her surrogate baby. Val also attracted the jealousy of Grace Black (Tamara Wall) due to her closeness with Trevor.

== Pete Buchanan ==
Pete Buchanan, played by Kai Owen, made his first on-screen appearance on 2 June 2015. The concept and name of the character was announced on 8 April 2015, whilst additional details such as casting was announced on 10 April 2015.

== Sonia Albright ==
Sonia Albright
- Hollyoaks character
- Portrayed by: Kiza Deen
- Duration: 2015–2016
- First appearance: 30 June 2015
- Last appearance: 27 October 2016
- Introduced by: Bryan Kirkwood
In-universe information
- Other names: Lisa Loveday
- Occupation: Restaurant manager
- Father: Lionel Albright
- Sisters: Jade Albright
- Half-brothers: Thomas Albright
- Half-sisters: Eva Albright

Sonia Albright (also credited as Lisa Loveday), played by Kiza Deen, made her first appearance on 30 June 2015. The concept for the character was announced on 15 June 2015, whilst the casting was announced on 22 June 2015. On 26 October 2016, it was announced Deen had finished filming with the show after more than a year in the role of Sonia. Her character departed the village on 27 October, as she moves to Belgium with her estranged father.

Lisa was introduced as the daughter Louis (Karl Collins) and Simone Loveday (Jacqueline Boatswain) and the sister of Zack Loveday (Duayne Boachie). It is revealed that Lisa was abducted after a day at school and that the press believed that Louis murdered her and disposed of her body. The Lovedays moved to Hollyoaks for a fresh start from their heartache and grief over the incident, but after Louis and Simone are accused of abducting Rose Lomax, Lisa and her abduction became common knowledge throughout the village. Lisa made her first appearance after breaking into the family home, with Zack managing to stop her running out the house, the intruder reveals herself as Lisa after the family question her, and out of happiness she hugs Louis. However, upon discovering that Lisa no longer has a birthmark she had as a child, Simone questions whether Lisa is who she claims to be. The family argue and Lisa runs away again. Louis blames Simone for driving Lisa away and reveals that he always blamed her for letting Lisa vanish in the first place. However, Wayne subsequently arrives at the Lovedays' home and claims Lisa has been attending a drop-in centre where he works. He leads the Lovedays to her, and she eventually agrees to return home. Louis pays Wayne a £6000 reward, but Zack later witnesses Lisa kissing Wayne and talking about their plan to scam the Lovedays out of the money. Wayne wants Lisa to leave with him, however, she chooses to stay with the Lovedays. When Lisa subsequently does not show up for a planned spa trip with Simone, Zack insists Lisa make amends or he will tell their parents the truth about the money.

It is later revealed that Lisa is actually an impostor, named Sonia Albright, who had heard about Lisa's life and decided that she wanted it. It has been revealed that Sonia has genuinely bonded with the Lovedays and wishes to stay with them. In flashback, it is revealed that Sonia had met the real Lisa, who gave Sonia a locket and told her about her life; the real Lisa was told that her parents and brother had died, and a woman named Margaret Smith (Suzette Llewellyn) took her in. Using details about Lisa's early childhood with the Lovedays, Sonia is able to successfully pose as her; although Zack became suspicious after finding a diary in which Sonia had taken notes from Lisa. When Jade arrived in the village, Sonia tried to pay her to leave but has since reached an agreement that Jade will keep up the ruse and pretend to be a friend from "Lisa's" past. When Zack began dating Theresa McQueen, Sonia realised that she herself is attracted to him. Although she has encouraged his relationship with Theresa in order to make him happy, Sonia has been questioning whether or not she should reveal her real identity and admit her feelings to Zack.

Sonia reveals to Zack that Theresa has only been dating him so that she can have sex. Zack then tells Theresa he does not want their relationship to be about sex, which is agrees to hesitantly. However, Theresa breaks up with him shortly afterward after telling him she does not love him. A while after they break up, Zack crashes his new car that he receives for Christmas, angering his parents. Sonia and Zack plan to take the car to the mechanic shop the Roscoes own. After they take it to the mechanic shop, Sonia kisses Zack passionately, which disturbs him. She then reveals that her real name is Sonia and Lisa Loveday. This angers Zack and forces her to tell his parents. Before she can, Simone and Louis announce that Simone has suffered a miscarriage and they want to focus on their surviving children. Sonia and Zack go on to have a relationship in secret, but Sonia is later confronted by Joanne Cardsley (Rachel Leskovac) who knows Sonia's real identity. She promises to keep Sonia's secret in exchange for Sonia's help in a prosecution case against Wayne.

When Louis and Simone go on a weekend away to reconnect, Zack and Sonia get passionate while they are away. However, Louis and Simone return after they forget a couple of belongings. When they go back inside their house, they see Zack and Sonia kissing on the sofa. Angry, Simone viciously slaps Zack around the face and calls them disgusting animals. When Zack says that she is not his real sister, Simone does not believe him. But when Sonia says he is telling the truth, Simone and Louis are distraught. They shout at Sonia and Zack for lying to them. While shouting, Sonia leaves the house and goes to Jade's. When she is at Jade's, Zack knocks the door and asks if he can come in. However, Simone and Louis are with him as well and they start bombarding her with questions. When Sonia says she can't remember all the details, they think she is lying to them and they believe she knows more than she is telling. When Sonia tells them that she lied about the real Lisa being dead, Zack breaks up with her and bans her from going anywhere near him or his parents again. Just before they leave, Sonia said that Joanne knew the person who 'kidnapped' Lisa, so the Lovedays make their way over to Joanne's office. Louis, Simone and DS Geoff Thorpe (James Bradshaw) question Joanne about Margaret, the person who abducted Lisa. Joanne lies to them about Margaret by saying she does not know who she is and she does not have a picture of her with Margaret. Joanne later threatens Sonia to have her arrested for fraud. Later on, Sonia is arrested by DS Thorpe on suspicion of fraud by deception and is taken into police custody for questioning. Sonia is cautioned after Louis persuaded Joanne to ask the police to be lenient. This angers Simone, who nearly ends her marriage with Louis. Sonia, Zack and Joanne go to see Margaret. Margaret is arrested after Joanne calls the police. At the police station, the real Lisa Loveday arrives.

Sonia decides to live with her father, her half-siblings and stepmother in Belgium, following Jade's death and funeral. Lisa would later visit her once a year.

== Carly Bradley ==
Carly Bradley
- Hollyoaks character
- Portrayed by: Sophie Wise
- First appearance: 3 July 2015
- Last appearance: 4 August 2015
- Introduced by: Bryan Kirkwood
In-universe information
- Father: Ben Bradley
- Stepmother: Sadie Bradley (until 2015); Sienna Blake (2016)
- Brothers: Josh Bradley
- Half-brothers: Taylor Bradley; Ryan Bradley

Carly Bradley, played by Sophie Wise, made her first appearance on 3 July 2015. The character was announced on 30 June 2015, with the casting announced on 3 July 2015. Carly is the daughter of Ben Bradley (Ben Richards).

Carly is in witness protection, hiding from drug dealer Ashley Davidson (Kierston Wareing). When Carly meets Ben's girlfriend, Sienna Blake (Anna Passey), unaware of her identity, Sienna mistakes Carly for Ben's secret girlfriend and begins fighting with her. Sienna's daughter, Nico Blake (Persephone Swales-Dawson), walks in and strikes Carly over the head with a paperweight, killing her. Sienna persuades Dr. Charles S'avage (Andrew Greenough) to smuggle the body into the hospital mortuary and dispose of her; but Celine McQueen (Sarah George) catches him and he is forced to pretend that he found Carly abandoned outside the hospital. Ben is devastated to learn of Carly's death and believes Trevor Royle (Greg Wood) is responsible.

== Angela Brown ==
Angela Brown, played by Adele Silva, made her first on-screen appearance on 14 July 2015. The character and casting was announced on 17 May 2015, although no details were given about the character apart from denying newspaper reports that she would be involved with the Blake family. Further details were released about the character on 1 June 2015, and confirmed that she and her husband, Mark Brown (Ben Faulks), will wish to adopt Peri Lomax's (Ruby O'Donnell) baby.

Angela first appears when she and Mark meet with Tom and Peri to discuss the adoption. Angela reveals that she suffered three miscarriages previously and had a daughter who died in infancy.

== Curtis Royle ==
Curtis Royle
- Hollyoaks character
- Portrayed by: Charlie Hughes (2015–2023); Reuben Shepherd (2024–present)
- Duration: 2015–2020, 2022–present
- First appearance: 17 July 2015
- Introduced by: Bryan Kirkwood
In-universe information
- Other names: Stephan Bloom
- Father: Trevor Royle
- Mother: Grace Black
- Stepfather: Freddie Roscoe
- Half-brothers: Dylan Jenkins; Rex Gallagher
- Grandfathers: Fraser Black
- Grandmothers: Tracey Donovan
- Uncles: Rex Gallagher; Adam Donovan; Liam Donovan; Jesse Donovan; Ro Hutchinson (adoptive)
- Aunts: Clare Devine; Dee Dee Hutchinson
- First cousins: Iona Campbell; Tori Devine-Banks (adoptive)
- Other relatives: Froggy Black; DC Sully Sullivan

Curtis Royle, played by Charlie Hughes, is the biological orphaned son of Trevor Royle (Greg Wood) and Grace Black (Tamara Wall), and the surrogate son of Esther Bloom (Jazmine Franks). He is also the step-son of Freddie Roscoe (Charlie Clapham). He first appears in Episode 4170 which originally aired on 17 July 2015, when he was born. Shortly after giving birth to a baby boy, who Trevor and Grace name Curtis, in the back of Trevor's car, Esther decides she wants to raise him as her own son. When Esther slips into a coma before falling victim to the Gloved Hand Killer, her grandmother Frankie Osborne (Helen Pearson) takes full custody of the baby and renames him Stephan. Esther later agrees to share custody of Curtis with Trevor after the death of his teenage son Dylan Jenkins (James Fletcher) on the condition that Grace is kept away from him. Curtis departed alongside Grace in Episode 6145, which originally aired on 30 June 2023.

On 29 July 2024, it was announced that Curtis would be returning to Hollyoaks, with Reuben Shepherd taking over the role from Hughes. Shepherd is the son of Coronation Street actor Jack P. Shepherd, who plays the regular role of David Platt. He made his debut on 30 September 2024. The Mirror reported: "Reuben is a chip off the old block. He's already impressing on set and his talent is shining through. He's got a bright future ahead of him."

== Mark Brown ==
Mark Brown, played by Ben Faulks, made his first on-screen appearance on 22 July 2015. The character and casting was announced on 1 June 2015. Mark is the husband of Angela Brown (Adele Silva), and wants to adopt Peri Lomax's (Ruby O'Donnell) baby.

== Wayne ==
Wayne
- Hollyoaks character
- Portrayed by: Nathan Whitfield
- Duration: 2015–2016
- First appearance: 27 July 2015
- Last appearance: 4 March 2016
- Introduced by: Bryan Kirkwood
In-universe information
- Occupation: Drug dealer

Wayne, played by Nathan Whitfield, made his first appearance on 27 July 2015. The character was announced on 19 July 2015. Wayne helps the Lovedays in their search for Lisa Loveday (Kiza Deen), who he will also be romantically involved with. He has been described as "sleazy" and "dodgy".

Wayne will also get mugged by Robbie Roscoe (Charlie Wernham). Shortly after his arrival, Wayne departed. He returned to the village in September when he confronts Lisa, demanding £2,000 from her. She does not have this money, so he offers to pimp her. Wayne ruins the opening day for Lisa and Lockie Campbell's (Nick Rhys) new business, The Tug Boat, by poisoning her brother Zack's (Duyane Boachie) burger. She grabs the burger from him and when questioned, states that she stored the meat at the wrong temperature. Lisa is seen walking down a dodgy alleyway, before Wayne tells her not to keep the man waiting. He later revealed that Lisa was an imposter, actually called Sonia. It was revealed that Wayne had helped Sonia take over Lisa's identity.

== Steph Cunningham-Lomax ==
Steph Cunningham-Lomax
- Hollyoaks character
- Portrayed by: Katie (2015–2019); Isabella Hibbert (2019–2024)
- Duration: 2015–2024
- First appearance: Episode 4202; 1 September 2015
- Last appearance: Episode 6455; 4 September 2024
- Introduced by: Bryan Kirkwood
In-universe information
- Father: Tom Cunningham
- Mother: Peri Lomax
- Stepfather: Abe Fielding
- Stepmother: Yasmine Maalik
- Grandfathers: Cameron Campbell; Gordon Cunningham
- Grandmothers: Leela Lomax; Helen Cunningham
- Uncles: Daniel Lomax; Noah Dexter
- Aunts: Jude Cunningham; Cindy Cunningham; Mandy Richardson; Clara Dexter
- First cousins: Holly Cunningham; Alfie Nightingale; Ella Richardson; Hilton Cunningham; DJ Morgan; Maddox Keane
- Other relatives: Granny Campbell; Danny Lomax; Sam Lomax; Lockie Campbell; Tegan Lomax; Ste Hay; Angela Brown; Courtney Campbell; Lucas Hay; Dee Dee Hutchinson; Hannah Hay-O'Connor; Iona Campbell; Leah Barnes (adoptive); Rose Lomax (adoptive)

Steph Cunningham-Lomax is the daughter of Peri Lomax (Ruby O'Donnell) and Tom Cunningham (Ellis Hollins). Peri decides to have Steph adopted before she is born, but Tom is against the idea, especially after losing both his parents Gordon (Bernard Latham) and Helen Cunningham (Kathryn George) in a car accident in 2004. Peri goes into labour at Hollyoaks High School and her mother, Leela Lomax (Kirsty-Leigh Porter), delivers Steph. After seeing how much Tom loves Steph, Peri decides against adoption. However, Peri struggles with motherhood and asks Tom to choose between her and Steph; Tom chooses Steph so he takes custody. Tom later considers moving to London with Steph, but does not. Steph departs in the episode aired on Wednesday 4th September, alongside Father Tom Cunningham, Aunt Cindy Cunningham and Cousin Hilton Cunningham

== Ashley Davidson ==
Ashley Davidson
- Hollyoaks character
- Portrayed by: Kierston Wareing
- First appearance: 7 September 2015
- Last appearance: 19 October 2015
- Introduced by: Bryan Kirkwood
In-universe information
- Other names: Lola
- Occupation: Drug dealer

Ashley Davidson, played by Kierston Wareing, made her first appearance on 7 September 2015. The character and casting were announced on 15 August 2015. Ashley will be a drug-dealer who was hunting for Ben Bradley's (Ben Richards) daughter Carly (Sophie Wise). Ashley will arrive in the village and meet with Trevor Royle (Greg Wood) where she demands money that she lost after Carly stole from her. Ashley has been billed as a "venomous vixen", with Wareing commenting that her character was a "control freak" and that she does not have "a nice bone in her body."

Ashley first appears in The Loft, and after hearing that Trevor has killed Carly, she tells him that her debts are now his, as Carly stole an expensive diamond ring from Ashley before she died. However, unbeknownst to everyone, Nico Blake (Persephone Swales-Dawson) is the real murderer. She then bumps into Theresa McQueen (Jorgie Porter), and it is revealed that they shared a cell when Theresa was in prison for murdering Calvin Valentine (Ricky Whittle). She confides in Ashley that Patrick Blake (Jeremy Sheffield) is constructing a special needs unit at Hollyoaks High School, but he and Theresa have scammed the money. Ashley then threatens Trevor, telling him to help her kidnap Patrick or she will reveal his dark past. However, Robbie Roscoe (Charlie Wernham), who is helping Ben send Trevor to prison for murdering Carly, overhears them and informs Ben. Hours before they are set to kidnap Patrick, Trevor realises that somebody has exposed their plan to the police. In a shocking twist, the pair kidnap Holly Cunningham (Amanda Clapham), Trevor's babysitter, believing her to be the snitch. Ashley plans to kill Holly and make her death look like a suicidal overdose, however, Robbie enters the basement where they are keeping Holly hostage and contacts his brother Jason (Alfie Browne-Sykes), who is a police officer. Ashley is determined to go through with killing Holly as her reputation will be damaged otherwise, however, Trevor releases Holly, angering Ashley.

The following month, Trevor gives Ashley photographs of Sienna Blake (Anna Passey) wearing the ring that Carly stole from her, resulting in her suspicions that Sienna was involved in Carly's death. Ashley later masquerades as a police officer, and manages to lure Sienna and her daughter, Nico, into a police car, and drives them to a scrapyard, where she attempts to set fire to the car with Sienna and Nico inside, but they manage to escape. When Ashley attacks Nico, Sienna strikes Ashley over the head with the petrol can, knocking her unconscious. When in hospital, she awakens from a coma, and leaves a taunting voicemail to Ben. Then, an unidentified person enters the room, and injects her with a fatal dose of potassium chloride. Dr. Charles S'avage (Andrew Greenough) witnesses Ashley descend into cardiac arrest and die, and realises that the Gloved Hand Killer has claimed yet another victim. This time more is learned about the killer, in which we find that the killer has brown hair, and a few days later Lindsey Roscoe (Sophie Austin) was revealed as the killer.

== Derek Clough ==
Derek Clough
- Hollyoaks character
- Portrayed by: Bruce Montague
- First appearance: 11 September 2015
- Last appearance: 23 September 2015
In-universe information
- Daughters: Porsche McQueen

Derek Clough, played by Bruce Montague, made his first appearance on 11 September 2015. The character and casting were announced on 16 August 2015. Derek will be Nana McQueen's (Diane Langton) abusive ex-boyfriend. Derek contacts Nana, telling her that he is dying, and whilst Nana considers going to visit him in hospital, her daughter, Reenie McQueen (Zöe Lucker) is against the idea.

It was revealed that Derek had repeatedly raped a teenage Reenie, which led to him fathering her daughter Porsche (Twinnie-Lee Moore). Shortly after Reenie revealed this, Derek died of COPD – an illness he had previously been diagnosed with before making his first appearance. Reenie picks up the phone to call an ambulance as Derek falls to the floor struggling to breathe, but Nana stops Reenie, telling her the sooner he dies the better. Nana and Reenie hold hands as they watch Derek die. Reenie tells Nana not to tell Porsche that Derek is her father. However, almost three months later, Porsche learns the truth after she receives a suitcase full of money which Derek had left her in his will.

== Jade Albright ==
Jade Albright
- Hollyoaks character
- Portrayed by: Kassius Nelson
- Duration: 2015–2017
- First appearance: 15 September 2015
- Last appearance: 28 February 2017
- Introduced by: Bryan Kirkwood
In-universe information
- Occupation: Student
- Father: Lionel Albright
- Adoptive father: Jack Osborne
- Adoptive mother: Frankie Osborne
- Sisters: Sonia Albright
- Half-brothers: Thomas Albright
- Half-sisters: Eva Albright

Jade Albright, played by Kassius Nelson, made her first appearance on 15 September 2015. Although the character had been revealed in previous spoilers, casting and further details were revealed on 12 September. Jade was a familiar face to Lisa Loveday (Kiza Deen), and when she refused to prostitute herself out for Wayne (Nathan Whitfield), he used Jade to convince her to do so. Kassius Nelson has said that Jade "arrives with an interesting past, but there are certain characters who won't want that past to be revealed..." Jade's storylines include being embroiled in the sexual abuse storyline involving Pete Buchanan (Kai Owen) and Cleo McQueen (Nadine Mulkerrin), being diagnosed with Hodgkin's Lymphoma, her close relationship with fellow cancer patient Alfie Nightingale (Richard Linnell) and being bullied by Peri Lomax (Ruby O'Donnell) and Nico Blake (Persephone Swales-Dawson). On 10 October 2016, it was announced that Jade would be killed off after losing her battle with cancer, with Nelson making her final appearance on 21 October. It was later revealed that Nelson had filmed further scenes as Jade as a hallucination, with her final scenes airing on 28 February 2017.

Jade first appears when Wayne reveals to Lisa that he has kidnapped her and states that he will only release her if Lisa decides to re-enter prostitution. It is then revealed that Lisa is not actually "Lisa Loveday", but a woman named Sonia Albright, and Jade is her younger sister. Jade manages to escape from Wayne and is desperate for Sonia take her in, but she refuses as the Lovedays believe that she is their daughter. Jade is devastated, and after confiding in Jack Osborne (Jimmy McKenna) about her troubled home life, he decides to foster Jade, delighting her. She moves in with the Osbornes and they accept her as a new addition to the family, much to Sonia's worry. Jade later accidentally calls Sonia by her actual name instead of "Lisa", leading to Theresa McQueen (Jorgie Porter) discovering her deceit. Jade is later targeted by Pete Buchanan, a sexual predator who has abused his stepdaughters, Cleo and Porsche McQueen (Twinnie-Lee Moore) sexually and Celine McQueen (Sarah George) emotionally. Cleo becomes riddled with jealousy when Pete begins helping Jade with her homework, and when she discovers that Pete has given Jade another mobile phone to only contact him on, Cleo attacks her, with Jack's son Darren Osborne (Ashley Taylor Dawson) and Cleo's mother Reenie McQueen (Zöe Lucker) having to intervene. When Pete's abusive ways are revealed, he persuades Jade to get in his car and drives off with her. He arranges to leave the country with her, however Sonia contacts Jade and informs her of Pete's sexual abuse of Cleo, so she flees from Pete.

Jade is later panic-stricken when Sonia's fake brother, Zack Loveday (Duayne Boachie) learns of her true identity after she tries to kiss him. When Sonia and Zack are arguing, Jade collapses, struggling to breathe, so Sonia takes her to hospital. There, Dr. Berrington (Tupele Dorgu), informs Jade that she may have a form of cancer. Jade is devastated but is supported by Sonia, Zack and the Osbornes. She grows close to Alfie Nightingale, who confides in her about his own battle with cancer. Eventually, Jade is formally diagnosed with a type of cancer known as Hodgkin's Lymphoma, which shatters her and her family. When Alfie breaks up with Jade, given that their relationship is on and off, Jade breaks down, saying she hates herself being sick. Alfie later reveals to Jade that he loves her. He helps her overcome her fear of cancer by shaving his hair off, as does Jade. After cutting their hair off, Alfie tells Jade that his previous cancer has returned, shocking Rachel Hardy (Jennifer Brooke), who comes in with Jack.

Jade becomes close to her foster brother Tom Cunningham (Ellis Hollins) after her break up with Alfie. Jade's friend, Peri Lomax, becomes extremely jealous. Jade is heartbroken when Tom breaks up with her and goes to Peri. Peri takes this advantage to bully Jade about her cancer online and teams with Nico Blake, who also taunts her. Jade reunites with Alfie but Peri and Nico decide to split them up again. Peri attempts to kiss Alfie although he rebuffs her advances; he refuses to tell Jade what happened. Peri and Nico decide to give Jade a makeover for a dinner with Alfie, however, he is shocked with Jade's sense of dressing, leaving her heartbroken. Nico attempts to convince Jade to speak to Alfie, while Peri pours a drink on her top, leaving her to change into Alfie's shirt. Jade tries to talk to Alfie but the door is opened by Peri wearing Alfie's shirt. Peri falsely tells Jade that she and Alfie slept together. Jade attempts to skip school but Sonia realises what she is up to and Jade reveals that Alfie slept with Peri. Sonia goes to the hospital, where Alfie is, and tells him that Jade has assumed that he slept with Peri. Alfie reveals that it was a false claim and Jade reveals that Peri said so. During an assembly in school, Jade confronts Peri, making her aware that she knows what she and Nico have been doing to her and reveals her plan of embarrassing Peri to the school. When Jade goes into the assembly, Nico pulls the wig off, leaving Jade to go into the assembly bald-headed and laughed at.

Jade later finds another lump on her leg, and she is distraught to be told that her cancer has returned so quickly. She decides to find her biological father, believing that it is not fair for the Osbornes to go through the grief of losing her if she does die. However, after seeing that her father now has another child and is married, Jade tearfully asks Jack whether she can return to the Osbornes'. Alfie and Jade eventually throw a party, however Jade has picked up an infection and collapses while making a heartfelt speech for Alfie. At hospital, Dr. Berrington informs Jade, Alfie, Sonia and the Osbornes that her immune system is weakening and her organs are beginning to shut down. Alfie and Jade then imagine a perfect day out together in Southport. In the fantasy, Jade informs Alfie that she has to leave him, but when Alfie asks why, he has discovered that Jade has tragically died in his arms, leaving him devastated. Jade reappears as Alfie imagines her after he suffers an emotional breakdown. Jade tells Alfie that she will always stay with him. Alfie keeps on imagining Jade is in his room, and so locks himself in his room to be with her. After snapping at his family, Jade tells Alfie that he does not need her anymore and that he needs his family, before disappearing.

A reporter writing for the Inside Soap Yearbook described Jade's death as "tragic". They also included Jade's return as a "vision" in their "A to Z" list of 2016, adding that "imaginary dead pals were all the rage in 2016!" In August 2017, Nelson was longlisted for Best Exit at the Inside Soap Awards, while Jade's death was longlisted for Best Show-Stopper. Both nominations made their shortlists, but Nelson did not win any awards.

== Lisa Loveday ==
Lisa Loveday
- Hollyoaks character
- Portrayed by: Rachel Adedeji; Serrayah Rowe (flashback); Alexis Simone (flashback)
- Duration: 2015–2020
- First appearance: 17 September 2015
- Last appearance: 9 September 2020
- Introduced by: Bryan Kirkwood
- Spin-off appearances: Hollyoaks Later (2020)
In-universe information
- Occupation: Businesswoman
- Father: Louis Loveday
- Mother: Simone Loveday
- Adoptive mother: Margaret Smith
- Brothers: Zack Loveday
- Half-brothers: Daniel Lomax
- Grandfathers: Walter Deveraux
- Grandmothers: Gloria Deveraux
- Aunts: Martine Deveraux
- First cousins: Mitchell Deveraux; Toby Faroe; Celeste Faroe

Lisa Loveday, played by Rachel Adedeji, made her first on-screen appearance during a flashback episode on 17 September 2015, before appearing regularly from 29 April 2016. Lisa is the daughter of Simone (Jacqueline Boatswain) and Louis Loveday (Karl Collins) and sister of Zack Loveday (Duayne Boachie) who had been missing for 15 years. In June 2020, it was announced Adedeji would exit the role later in the year; she exited on 9 September after the character was killed off.

Lisa first appears in Hollyoaks at the police station when her kidnapper and adoptive mother, Margaret Smith (Suzette Llewellyn), is arrested for kidnapping her. Her mother Simone (Jacqueline Boatswain) and father Louis (Karl Collins) are stunned to see her. Louis and Simone later do a DNA test to see if she's really their daughter, and the results come back as positive. Lisa later confronts Sonia Albright (Kiza Deen) after she discovered that she stole her life. Lisa then attacks Sonia for stealing her life, and Zack Loveday (Duayne Boachie) breaks them up and separates them. Zack later takes Lisa back to his house and he and his parents show her objects and pictures from the past, which she remembers. Lisa later goes to the police station to confront Margaret, who she's angry with for kidnapping her and making her believe that her parents and brother were killed in a car crash. However, Margaret manipulates Lisa into by saying she took her in because her parents didn't love her. She believes what she says and later disowns the Lovedays for having Margaret arrested. As a result of Margaret's manipulation, Lisa wrecks Price Slice. As soon as Simone and Louis walk in, she pours some sauce on Sonia's hair and blames her for all of the damage. Simone believes her, but Zack and Louis do not. After the incident, Louis sees Joanne on the street and they talk about what had happened. Joanne reveals that nobody knows what Lisa is truly like, and therefore, Louis grows even more suspicious of Lisa afterwards. Eventually, Sonia pleads guilty to the wreckage with Joanne by her side at the police station, even though she didn't really do it. Joanne tells her that it would be better to plead not guilty, but Sonia objects to this idea.

Lisa later begins a feud with Sonia, trying to separate her from Zack and ruin her life. Lisa persuades Simone to take the restaurant away from Sonia in which she does leaving Lisa the manager. Lisa forms friendships with Holly Cunningham (Amanda Clapham), Ellie Nightingale (Sophie Porley) and Cleo McQueen (Nadine Mulkerrin). When Sonia applies for a course at Hollyoaks University, Lisa ruins it revealing about Sonia imposing her. This leads to a fight between them, leading to Lisa hurting her ankle. In order to spite Sonia more, Lisa sets Holly with Zack however the plan does not work, leaving her furious. Lisa is furious when Simone and Louis accept his relationship with Sonia, so Lisa decides to begin a relationship with Jesse Donovan (Luke Jerdy), leaving Simone angry. After a failed romance with Nathan Nightingale (Jared Garfield), Lisa's friend, Cleo, sets both Lisa and Nathan up. They begin a problematic relationship, but however, during a village blackout, they have sex. However, after becoming engaged to Nathan and moving in with him and his family, Lisa has sex with Nathan's father, Mac Nightingale (David Easter), and the pair swear each other to secrecy. Mac and Lisa then begin an affair.

The character of Lisa has been known since 2015, but her former friend Sonia has been pretending to be her. Lisa has been billed as "a loud and brassy party animal" and "is on a mission to claim back the family that is rightfully hers". Adedeji was cast in the role of Lisa and had already begun filming with the show when her casting was announced. Adedeji stated she was "excited" to have joined the show's cast, but said it was "quite a pressure" to be introduced as Lisa because "she is such an anticipated arrival". Adedeji added that Lisa's backstory had "turned her into a tough cookie". Adedeji's agent informed her that Hollyoaks were interested in hiring her. She attended a meeting with production and read for the part. Adedeji told Lorraine Kelly that her character has "sass" and is "feisty". Adedeji made a temporary departure from Hollyoaks for maternity leave, with her character leaving on 1 December 2017. She made her on-screen return on 13 November 2018.

In August 2017, Adedeji was longlisted for "Sexiest Female" at the Inside Soap Awards. She did not progress to the viewer-voted shortlist.

== Joanne Cardsley ==
Joanne Cardsley, played by Rachel Leskovac, made her first appearance on 17 September 2015 in a special flashback episode, but returned as a regular character on 26 November 2015. Joanne is a lawyer who was Simone Loveday's (Jacqueline Boatswain) co-worker, who ended up having an affair with her husband, Louis Loveday (Karl Collins). The character made her final appearance on 5 December 2016.

== Sadie Bradley ==
Sadie Bradley
- Hollyoaks character
- Portrayed by: Kirsty Mitchell
- First appearance: 8 October 2015
- Last appearance: 9 October 2015
- Introduced by: Bryan Kirkwood
In-universe information
- Husband: Ben Bradley (divorced)
- Sons: Ryan Bradley; Taylor Bradley
- Stepsons: Josh Bradley
- Stepdaughters: Carly Bradley

Sadie Bradley, played by Kirsty Mitchell, made her first appearance on 8 October 2015. The character was announced on 22 September 2015, with the casting revealed in the episode credits. Sadie is Ben Bradley's (Ben Richards) ex-wife who walked out on him, and when she arrives in the village she makes it her plan to win him back.

She arrived in the village for the funeral of her stepdaughter, Carly (Sophie Wise) and tried to win back Ben, to the annoyance of his girlfriend Sienna Blake (Anna Passey). They argue in the toilets of The Dog in the Pond, with Sienna's daughter, Nico (Persephone Swales-Dawson) tearing her dress when she attacks Sadie. Sadie becomes pleased when Ben agrees to live with her and their two sons, but Sienna does not agree with this. Sadie later tries to dissuade Ben from entering a fire that Sienna is trapped in, but she fails to convince him. As Ben and Sadie prepare to leave, Ben decides against it and proposes to Sienna. Sadie leaves the village and is not seen again.

== Ellie Nightingale ==
Ellie Nightingale
- Hollyoaks character
- Portrayed by: Sophie Porley; Ruby McMillan-Wilson (2018 flashback)
- Duration: 2015–2018
- First appearance: 23 October 2015
- Last appearance: 13 September 2018
- Introduced by: Bryan Kirkwood
In-universe information
- Occupation: Barmaid (2015–2018); Beautician (2016–2018)
- Father: Mac Nightingale
- Mother: Marnie Nightingale
- Stepmother: Cindy Cunningham
- Brothers: Nathan Nightingale; James Nightingale
- Half-brothers: Alfie Nightingale
- Half-sisters: Juliet Nightingale
- Grandmothers: Tabitha Maxwell-Brown
- Nephews: Romeo Nightingale

Ellie Nightingale, played by Sophie Porley, made her first appearance on 23 October 2015. The character and casting was announced on 22 September 2015. Ellie is Mac Nightingale's (David Easter) daughter and has been billed as a "spoiled princess" and likely to get the better of anyone in a "verbal sparring match". It has also been said that she'll cause some serious drama when she arrives as her "spiky attitude starts to rub people up the wrong way."" Ellie arrived with her father, Mac and brother, Nathan (Jared Garfield) as they took over the reign of local pub, The Dog in the Pond from the Osborne family. Ellie was portrayed by Ruby McMillan-Wilson in a 2018 flashback episode. Porley departed the role on 13 September 2018 alongside Amanda Clapham who portrays Holly Cunningham.

She is in an on-off relationship with Freddie Roscoe (Charlie Clapham), who has had sex with her mother Marnie (Lysette Anthony) twice. In June 2016, Ellie and Marnie lie that Rachel Hardy (Jennifer Brooke) cheated on Nathan with a guy called "Damien" although Ellie reveals that it was a lie. In July 2016, Ellie agrees to help Marnie split Mac and Neeta Kaur (Amrit Maghera) up so Ellie takes her to the Donovans' party and gets her drunk. Ellie snaps a photo of Neeta sleeping on Jesse Donovan's (Luke Jerdy) shoulder. The photo is shown to Mac who gets furious and attacks Jesse but he later learns the truth. In August 2016, Ellie learns that Freddie has been having an affair after accidentally receiving a photo by Jade Albright (Kassius Nelson) which sees Freddie kissing a woman. Marnie lies that it is Neeta but later Cindy Savage (Stephanie Waring) reveals that she is the woman. Ellie almost reconciles with Freddie but Cindy ruins it by slapping Freddie, so she declares that they are over. She has an argument with Cindy which leads to Alfie fainting. Freddie tries to reconcile with her in the hospital but Ellie rejects him.

On 17 August 2016, it was announced that Ellie would be involved in a dark storyline which will see Ellie go home with newcomer Nick Savage (Ben-Ryan Davies) and wakes up in the morning with no recollection of having sex with him. This storyline began in September 2016.

Some of Ellie's later storylines involved dealing with the consequences of pushing her father Mac out of the window and helping Alfie through his schizoaffective disorder diagnosis. She left the village on 13 September 2018, going to Paris with Holly.

== Nathan Nightingale ==
Nathan Nightingale
- Hollyoaks character
- Portrayed by: Jared Garfield (2015–2017); Oliver Lock (2018; flashback)
- Duration: 2015–2018
- First appearance: 23 October 2015
- Last appearance: 2 July 2018
- Introduced by: Bryan Kirkwood
In-universe information
- Occupation: Pub landlord
- Father: Mac Nightingale
- Mother: Marnie Nightingale
- Stepmother: Cindy Cunningham
- Brothers: James Nightingale
- Sisters: Ellie Nightingale
- Half-brothers: Alfie Nightingale
- Half-sisters: Juliet Nightingale
- Grandmothers: Tabitha Maxwell-Brown
- Nephews: Romeo Nightingale

Nathan Nightingale, played by Jared Garfield, made his first on-screen appearance on 23 October 2015. The character and casting was announced on 22 September 2015. Nathan is Mac Nightingale's (David Easter) son and has been said to be the "newest heartthrob in the Hollyoaks village" and is "honest, loyal and always happy to help anyone's problems go away with a big hug and lots of love." It's said he prefers to use a "twinkle in his eye and a firm hand" to solve problems. Nathan will arrive in the village alongside his family and fiancé, Rachel Hardy (Jennifer Brooke)." Garfield has previously portrayed Doctor Duffy in a 2014 episode of the soap opera. Garfield left the role of Nathan on 15 February 2017, with the character being killed off during an altercation with his father, Mac. In August 2017, Garfield was longlisted for Best Exit at the Inside Soap Awards, while Nathan's death was longlisted for Best Shock Twist. The nomination for Best Shock Twist made the viewer-voted shortlist, but it lost out to the surprise return of Andy Carver (Oliver Farnworth) in Coronation Street. Nathan was portrayed by Oliver Lock in a 2018 flashback episode.

Nathan first arrives with his father, Mac, and sister, Ellie (Sophie Porley) as they took the reins of the local pub, The Dog in the Pond from the Osborne family. Nathan is shocked to learn that his adopted brother, Alfie (Richard Linnell) is actually his half-brother when Mac revealed he is Alfie's biological father and Cindy Savage (Stephanie Waring) is Alfie's biological mother. In December 2015, Ellie becomes jealous when Nathan and Rachel organise a holiday to Marbella over Christmas, so schemes to stop it from happening. On a night out, Ellie deliberately spills a drink over Rachel, forcing her to get changed, and encourages Nathan to get flirtatious with Porsche McQueen (Twinnie-Lee Moore). When Rachel sees them, she declares their engagement over, so Nathan kisses Porsche. However, Nathan desperately tries to win Rachel back when Porsche reveals their kiss to her, and eventually, Rachel forgives him and they go on holiday to Marbella.

In March 2016, Nathan and Rachel are preparing to go on a trip to South America. However, Nathan postpones the trip when he finds out about Alfie's cancer returning and that Rachel knew before he did. Nathan and Rachel argue, but after a heart-to-heart with Alfie, he makes amends with Rachel before she attempts to leave for South America by herself. During the journey, the car breaks down, so Nathan fixes it in time to get to the airport. Before getting in the car to drive, Nathan dives out of the way as a drunken Holly Cunningham (Amanda Clapham) crashes into their car, injuring Rachel. Cleo McQueen (Nadine Mulkerrin), who was in Holly's car, regains consciousness just as Nathan saves her from being crushed by a boulder from above. As the firefighters approach to rescue Rachel, the car explodes in flames, killing Rachel instantly. Mac, Ellie and Alfie arrive at hospital to comfort a grief-stricken Nathan.

Nathan grows closer to Holly, eventually developing feelings for her. He continues to hate Cleo, as she has covered for Holly by stating that she was driving the car. He is drawn even closer to Holly after Ellie and their manipulative mother, Marnie (Lysette Anthony), lie to him that Rachel was having an affair behind his back, in order for him to get over Rachel faster. He and Holly sleep together and begin a relationship. Nathan later discovers that Marnie and Ellie were lying about Rachel's affair, and that Holly knew. Although angry at Holly, Nathan sees her convincing Reenie McQueen (Zöe Lucker) to support her daughter Cleo through paedophile Pete Buchanan's (Kai Owen) sexual abuse trial. At the trial, Cleo reveals that Holly was driving the car due to her being under oath, which prompts Nathan to break up with Holly and form a friendship with Cleo.

Nathan begins to develop feelings for Cleo, but she is not ready after everything that Pete put her through. Cleo pairs Nathan with Lisa Loveday (Rachel Adedeji), and they later start dating. However, Nathan struggles to understand Lisa's reckless lifestyle. Nathan later bonds with Lisa during a blackout in the village, and the pair have sex. The couple begin looking at houses to move in together, angering Marnie, who deeply disapproves of their relationship. By now, Cleo has also developed feelings for Nathan, and sends an email expressing her feelings after being prompted to by her sister, Celine McQueen (Sarah George). Nathan finds the email and reveals that he is now in love with Lisa and that Cleo is too late. However, Lisa finds the email, and retaliates by having sex with Mac, Nathan's father.

Mac and Lisa begin an affair behind Nathan and Marnie's backs, with them arranging to go away on luxury weekend breaks together. Nathan, meanwhile, comforts Cleo after Celine goes missing, unaware that she has actually been murdered by Cameron Campbell (Cameron Moore). While on a romantic getaway, Mac accidentally runs Cameron over, with Lisa attempting to help him. Mac orders Lisa to leave him, and the pair drive off. Cameron remembers Lisa trying to help him, and begins blackmailing the pair from prison. However, this soon stops, but Marnie and Nathan find blood on Mac's van, with Marnie taking the vehicle to be scrapped to save Mac. Nathan, however, finds one of Lisa's bras in the back, and confronts him about cheating on Marnie, unaware that the bra is Lisa's. On the day of Celine's funeral, Cleo finally decides to tell Nathan how she really feels, however, Nathan has just gotten engaged to Lisa. At the engagement party, Mac and Lisa begin to have sex, but Nathan walks in on them. As Mac attempts to explain, Nathan stumbles backwards and falls out of the window, with Cleo watching in horror. As Cleo, Mac, Marnie, Lisa, Ellie, Alfie and Freddie Roscoe (Charlie Clapham) rush to help, Nathan manages to utter the word "dad" before dying from his injuries in Marnie's arms.

Ten months after his death, his family finally gained justice to Mac for his death, after Ellie gained her revenge on her father for killing Nathan and abusing James. In 2018, Cleo went to the graveyard to talk about her issues including her trouble relationship with Joel.

== Alfie Nightingale ==
Alfie Nightingale
- Hollyoaks character
- Portrayed by: Richard Linnell; Jacob Fullagar (flashback)
- Duration: 2015–2019
- First appearance: 23 October 2015
- Last appearance: 31 January 2019
- Introduced by: Bryan Kirkwood
In-universe information
- Occupation: Student
- Family: Cunningham
- Father: Mac Nightingale
- Mother: Cindy Cunningham
- Stepmother: Marnie Nightingale
- Half-brothers: James Nightingale; Nathan Nightingale; Maddox Keane; Hilton Cunningham
- Half-sisters: Ellie Nightingale; Holly Cunningham; Juliet Nightingale
- Grandfathers: Gordon Cunningham
- Grandmothers: Angela Cunningham
- Uncles: Max Cunningham; Tom Cunningham
- Aunts: Dawn Cunningham; Jude Cunningham
- Nephews: Romeo Nightingale
- First cousins: Bethany Cunningham; Steph Cunningham-Lomax
- Other relatives: Caleb Keane

Alfie Nightingale, played by Richard Linnell, made his first on screen appearance on 26 October 2015. The character and casting was announced on 22 September 2015. Alfie is the youngest member of the Nightingale family. He is Mac Nightingale's (David Easter) biological son with Cindy Cunningham (Stephanie Waring) and the adopted son of Marnie Nightingale (Lysette Anthony). Alfie has been billed as "sensitive, inquisitive, and easygoing", yet lacks the "social confidence" of his half-brother Nathan Nightingale (Jared Garfield). "Alfie will be a pupil at Hollyoaks High, and has already been tipped to be given a romance storyline." Jacob Fullagar portrayed a younger version of the character in a recorded video, originally broadcast on 7 June 2018.

Alfie strikes up a friendship with Nico Blake (Persephone Swales-Dawson), upon his arrival in the village quickly developing a crush on her. However, Nico does not feel the same way and tries to let him down easy because he is too clingy. He tries to befriend her by sneaking his bearded dragon lizard into school and setting off fireworks on the city hall, however, both incidents get him into trouble and fails to impress Nico. She confides in him, however, that she thinks there is a serial killer in the village who murdered her boyfriend, Dylan Jenkins (James Fletcher). Later in November 2015, Nathan discovered Mac's secret marriage to Cindy, after Alfie spotted them looking close and thought Mac was having an affair. Mac then revealed to Nathan that he was, in fact, Alfie's biological father and Cindy was his biological mother. He then told Nathan how he chose to move to the village in order for Alfie to be closer to Cindy. When Alfie's adoptive mother, Marnie, fails to show up to see him, Neeta Kaur (Amrit Maghera) comforts him. He then tells Mac he wants Neeta to adopt him. Mac disagrees, fearing it will reveal who Alfie's biological parents are and his marriage to Cindy and says it is because he already has Marnie. Alfie then collapses upstairs and is found by a distraught Mac. While in hospital, he believes his cancer has returned and confesses to Neeta that he wanted her to adopt him. Neeta is delighted and promises to get on it after he is better. At the hospital, Tegan Lomax (Jessica Ellis) tells Alfie, Mac and Mac's daughter Ellie Nightingale (Sophie Porley) that Alfie's cancer has not returned, much to their delight. Taking inspiration from Jason Roscoe's (Alfie Browne-Sykes) romantic gesture to his girlfriend and Cindy's daughter Holly Cunningham (Amanda Clapham), Alfie then leaves a bunch of flowers identical to the ones Jason bought Holly in Nico's locker; she, however, assumes that they were from Jason and this leads to her embarrassing herself at a Christmas party. Nico then confides to Alfie about her crush on Jason and her discovery that Holly is having an affair, unaware of Alfie's feeling for her.

Alfie wants to know who his birth father is so he runs a DNA test in The Hutch. He gets a fork Mac and Tony Hutchinson (Nick Pickard) have been using but does not know whose it is. On the day of Mac's wedding, Alfie asks Tony if he could make an Indian buffet on short notice and he agrees as Alfie is desperate but in all the excitement he forgets his bag. Tony opens his bag and sees the DNA test results proving that he is Alfie's biological father. A few weeks later, Alfie finds out that Mac and Cindy are his biological parents after his adoptive mother, Marnie, found out that they slept with each other fifteen years ago. Alfie then refuses to forgive and acknowledge Mac for lying to him. He then packs his bags so he can live with Cindy. While attempting to bond with Cindy, he shows some of his memorabilia from his past. Cindy then learns he suffered from Hodgkin's lymphoma when he was younger. Cindy then apologises to Alfie for not being there for him when he was younger. However, on the next day, Cindy tells him that he should go and live back with the Nightingales as they have raised him for much of his life after Neeta told her that he should. Alfie is able to forgive Mac eventually and he supports Jade Albright (Kassius Nelson), as she is diagnosed with Hodgkin's lymphoma. Given that they have an on-and-off relationship, Alfie tells Jade he loves her. Jade, who resents her illness because her hair is falling out due to chemotherapy, is encouraged by Alfie to fight against her illness by shaving and cutting off her hair that she is losing. Alfie also shaves off his own hair and afterwards, he tells Jade that his form of cancer has returned, shocking Nathan's girlfriend Rachel Hardy (Jennifer Brooke), who comes in the house with Jack Osborne (Jimmy McKenna). Alfie persuades Rachel not to say anything to Nathan or Mac because he does not want his family worrying about him, let alone let his illness destroy any hope of him and his family having a positive future ahead of them.

After visiting the doctor with Rachel, who informs him that his Hodgkin's lymphoma has returned, a devastated Cindy finds out while she is eavesdropping on a conversation between Alfie and Jade. Cindy tells the rest of his family about the news, leaving them all shocked. Alfie and Rachel then have a conversation with each other in the bathroom about Rachel going to his appointments with him. Unbeknownst to them, Marnie eavesdrops on their conversation. Marnie then tells the Nightingales that Rachel has been going to with secret appointments with Alfie, pretending to be Ellie. These revelations anger Nathan, who cancels his and Rachel's trip to South America and also ends their relationship. Alfie convinces Nathan to give Rachel a second chance, and the couple leave for the airport. On their way there, Holly crashes into their car, causing an explosion that kills Rachel. It is later revealed that Alfie's chemotherapy treatments have not been working.

Alfie was later devastated when Jade lost her battle against cancer, Nathan's death and the discovery of Ellie being raped by Holly's boyfriend Nick Savage (Ben-Ryan Davies). Despite Holly asking him to tell Ellie to drop the charges, Alfie has decided to side with Ellie, but later helps Holly after learning she was also raped by Nick. Before leaving the village, Alfie then cut ties with his father, upon learning that he killed Neeta and Nathan, abusing James & what he has done to his mother.

== Rachel Hardy ==
Rachel Hardy, played by Jennifer Brooke, made her first on-screen appearance on 26 October 2015. The character and casting was announced on 22 September 2015. Rachel is Nathan Nightingale's (Jared Garfield) fiancée and has been billed as "the girl next door who has a heart of gold but is not afraid to speak her mind. Rachel gets on well with the whole family, with the only tension being Nathan's lack of approval of her body art." Brooke left the role of Rachel in March 2016, with the character being killed off in a car explosion caused by Holly Cunningham (Amanda Clapham).

== Neeta Kaur ==
Neeta Kaur
- Hollyoaks character
- Portrayed by: Amrit Maghera
- Duration: 2015–2017
- First appearance: 27 October 2015
- Last appearance: 1 November 2017
- Introduced by: Bryan Kirkwood
In-universe information
- Occupation: Barmaid; Teaching assistant
- Sisters: Asha Kaur

Neeta Kaur, played by Amrit Maghera, made her first screen appearance on 27 October 2015. The character and casting was announced on 22 September 2015. Neeta is Mac Nightingale's (David Easter) fiancée, but is considerably younger than him, which causes Mac's daughter, Ellie (Sophie Porley), to believe that she is a "gold-digger". Neeta has been billed as "warm and bubbly" and someone who wears "her heart on her sleeve". "It's also said that she will transform The Dog in the Pond public house with a brand-new menu and series of entertaining themed nights." The character was killed off on 1 November 2017 after being involved in an explosion at the local high school.

Neeta first arrives at The Dog searching for Mac, however, Ellie tricks her into believing that Mac has finished with her forever, despite him actually wanting to reconcile. Rachel Hardy (Jennifer Brooke) later realises that Neeta has been at The Dog after she drops her scarf, but Ellie denies all knowledge. Rachel then finds a note that Neeta left for Mac screwed up in the bin, and realises that Ellie has lied. Neeta later reconciles with Mac and moves in, which infuriates Ellie. Mac's youngest son, Alfie Nightingale (Richard Linnell), who is believed to be adopted, asks Neeta if she would adopt him and become his mother, however, she is unable due to Mac's ex-wife, Marnie, already adopting Alfie, which upsets Neeta.

On Neeta and Mac's wedding day, Cindy Savage (Stephanie Waring) tells Neeta that Mac is married to her and that their annulment is forged. Neeta then slaps Mac and storms out of the wedding venue. Neeta then ends their relationship and tries to leave Hollyoaks, but Ellie convinces her to give him a second chance as his marriage to Cindy was a mistake. She then gives him a second chance and tells him if he hides another secret from her, she will end their relationship for good. However, she overhears a small part of Mac's conversation with Nathan about Alfie being his biological son with Cindy. Later on, Neeta leaves a note in their apartment telling Mac giving him a second chance was a mistake. She then leaves while nobody is looking.

Neeta arrives back in Hollyoaks a few weeks later after Nathan told her about Alfie being Mac and Cindy's biological son. She tries to convince an angry Alfie to live back with the Nightingales, but he angrily tells her that he wants nothing to more to do with them and that he wants to live with Cindy. She later becomes friends with Cindy after her divorce with Mac, so she could marry Dirk Savage (David Kennedy).

Mac's ex-wife Marnie (Lysette Anthony) plans to split Neeta and Mac up. Ellie takes Neeta to a party and gets her drunk. Neeta falls asleep on Jesse Donovan's (Luke Jerdy) shoulder and Ellie takes this to snap a photo, making Mac believe that Neeta cheated on him. Mac attacks Jesse with Neeta witnessing this and Neeta tells Grace Black (Tamara Wall) that Mac attacked Jesse. Mac later finds out that Marnie planned this and apologizes to Neeta.

A few weeks later Mac arrives at the Donovan's salon with Neeta and offers to help, this ends badly when Jesse dyes Mac's hair blue as an act of revenge, Mac is angry, however, Neeta tries to make Mac see the funny side.

The model for the Donovan's Hair Salon photo shoot arrives before Marnie sends her away. Marnie cunningly suggests that Neeta should take the model's place, knowing that it would anger Mac. Mac walks in on the photoshoot and angrily tells the Donovan brothers to take their hands of Neeta before Neeta is embarrassed and storms out of the salon. Mac later apologizes to Neeta and she tells the Donovan's not to use her picture, knowing how Mac feels about it. While Ellie is ordering the pictures from the photoshoot, Marnie convinces Ellie to use Neeta's picture, Ellie reluctantly agrees.

A few days later the picture arrives and Adam Donovan is furious to see Neeta on the picture as he knows that Mac would be angry about it. Neeta is also angry but is then persuaded by Marnie to use the picture, Neeta agrees. Later on Mac arrives at the salon and tells Neeta that he wants to go on holiday with Neeta. However, Mac quickly becomes very angry when he sees Neeta's picture with the Donovan brothers outside the salon. Mac picks up the photo and smashes it inside the salon. Neeta begs Mac to stop but Mac does not listen. Jesse is holding a photo frame in his hand which Mac grabs and tries to pull. Mac pulls a bit too hard which sends Neeta flying to the ground. She utters the words "get away from me" to Mac.

The next day Mac buys Neeta some flowers to apologize for attacking her the previous day. Neeta tells Mac that she cannot think of going on holiday with Mac or forgive Mac until he apologizes to the Donovan's. Later on Mac apologizes to Jesse. Neeta arrives back at the Nightingale's and Mac tells her that he has apologized to Jesse. Neeta reveals that her ex used to hit her when he used to get angry but Mac insists that he is not a violent person. Neeta forgives Mac and agrees to go on holiday with him. However, their happiness is short-lived when the police knock on their door and arrest Mac for attacking Neeta.

At the police station, the Nightingale's are all waiting for Mac to be released. When Mac is released he tells Neeta that the police have taken his passport so he will not be going on holiday with Neeta, he also reveals that he has not been honest with Neeta. Back home, Mac tells Neeta that he has a criminal record of violence from his past. This scares Neeta and she becomes emotional as memories of her violent ex come flooding back. Neeta tells Mac that she needs time to think so she goes on holiday on her own. It is later revealed that Marnie called the police.

Ellie is furious to find out that Freddie had cheated on her and instantly blames Neeta as the mystery woman. With Neeta not present to defend herself Ellie resorts to burning Neeta's clothes. Neeta returns and witnesses Mac and Marnie hugging in public. The next day Neeta is distraught to see all of her clothes ruined and asks Mac why he never believed her. Neeta also brings up the hug that she witnessed between Mac and Marnie, Mac assures her that it did not mean anything.

Neeta is reluctant to trust Mac after his violent streak was revealed. Nathan suggests to Mac that he should marry Neeta again. Mac and the kids surprise Neeta with a wedding and Mac promises Neeta that he will never hurt anybody again. Neeta agrees and goes to the Donovan's salon with Ellie to get ready. Marnie is distraught over the fact that Mac is marrying someone else so she ruins the wedding venue. James Nightingale catches her and tells het to go home before Mac sees anything. While James is trying to clean up the mess, Mac sees and beats James up as he thinks James is to blame. Mac tells Nathan to clean up the venue. Neeta later arrives and walks down the aisle, Mac places his hand on Neeta's and she sees that there are bruises on Mac's knuckles. Mac tries to tell her that he did not hurt anyone but she does not believe one word that comes out of his mouth. Neeta storms out of the wedding venue and goes to the Donovan's house. Grace tells Neeta that she can stay with her and that she can work at the Loft.

Neeta is very cheerful and happy as her new life without Mac is going to plan. She tells Grace that she is going to study Art and Design at Dee Valley University and also wants to fly a plane. Later on that day Neeta attends a meeting held by the villagers to stop the new housing development being built in their village.

Neeta goes to the ATM to withdraw some money and is shocked to see that the account is empty. Neeta confronts Mac, which James witnesses. He suggests that Neeta sue Mac and she agrees. Neeta arrives at The Dog to comfort a grieving Alfie. Mac and Marnie ask Neeta why she is suing Mac, which leads to an argument. Marnie scolds Neeta due to her lack of sensitivity as Jade died the previous day. Neeta goes to James' flat to confront him over sending the letter so soon. James reminds Neeta that he was merely following her orders. Neeta asks James not to involve her with his vendetta against Mac.

Neeta's friend Maxine Minniver (Nikki Sanderson) finds a ring hidden in her partner Adam Donovan's (Jimmy Essex) belongings and she confides in Neeta that she is not ready to get married again. Neeta convinces Maxine to try the ring on and it gets stuck. Neeta tries to help Maxine to get the ring off, but it does not work. Ellie confides in Neeta that she had sex with Nick Savage at the traffic light party a few weeks ago. Neeta reassures Ellie that she had broken up with Freddie, so she has nothing to feel guilty about. Neeta convinces Ellie to give her relationship with Freddie another chance. Neeta supports Maxine when she learn that Adam's ex-fiancée went missing and is presumed dead. Neeta assures Maxine that Adam is not a murderer and she should forget everything that happened with Darcy. When Maxine attacks Adam, Neeta helps Maxine to pack. Neeta asks Grace whether Adam has a violent side to him, but their conversation is interrupted by Adam and Maxine arguing and Neeta accidentally reveals that it was Maxine who attacked Adam.

Neeta loses her court case against Mac, as he lies about her being a gold digger. After an altercation with Mac in the village, Neeta is determined to get her life back on track and applies for a teaching assistant job at Hollyoaks High. She asks James to get her an interview. The head teacher Sally St. Claire (Annie Wallace) gives Neeta the chance to sit in on a class. When the teacher has to leave the room, Prince and Hunter McQueen take the opportunity to leave the school for the day by tricking Neeta into letting them go to the nurse's office. Neeta tells Sally what happened and gives an emotional speech as to why she wants to work as a teacher. Sally is convinced by Neeta's speech and she is given the job.

John Paul McQueen asks Neeta to cover his Year 11 class for him, but she has trouble controlling the class. Neeta notices new student Lily Drinkwell reading a note from Prince McQueen, and tells her to get on with reading Jane Eyre. Lily tells Neeta that she has read the book three times as it was one of her mother's favourites, causing Neeta to snap and say that Lily's mother would be ashamed if she knew she was not reading the book. Lily leaves the classroom and Neeta learns Lily's mother recently died. She later apologises to Lily.

In February 2017, Neeta catches Sally looking at a lonely hearts magazine and asks Sally if she has considered going on dates. Later on, Neeta bumps into Ellie and they have a heart to heart about Nathan's death. Ellie hands Neeta a leaflet for an LGBT speed dating event at The Nightingale's restaurant that Nathan was organising before his death. Neeta later bumps into Sally in Price Slice and hands her the leaflet and suggests that she should attend.

The following day, Neeta and helps to prepare Sally for the speed dating event at The Nightingale's restaurant. When they attend, Sally convinces Neeta to join in. Neeta later leaves the speed dating event and bumps into Hunter McQueen in the village who is painting some graffiti on a wall. They have a heart to heart and Hunter tells Neeta that he told his dad to leave as he did not want his mum to get hurt. Neeta assures Hunter that he did the right thing for protecting his mum and he thanks her. Neeta later re-joins the speed dating event and her and Sally have a laugh about the dates that they had.

It is Nathan's funeral the following day. Neeta is sitting outside the Bean and is clearly upset about it. Jesse bumps into Neeta and asks her if she can look after Curtis for the day. Before Neeta has the chance to say anything, Jesse storms off leaving Curtis with Neeta. Neeta later sees Sally in the village and pulls her hood up as Neeta is supposed to be working that day. Neeta later goes to the lake where flowers and memories of Nathan are being placed there. Sally catches Neeta which leads her to getting emotional about Nathan's death. Curtis begins to get restless and Neeta takes him out of his pram, forgetting to put the brakes on. The pram therefore, falls into the lake.

Later on that day, Neeta tells Jesse that Curtis' pram has fallen into the lake but she is quick to order a new one. When she shows Jesse the pram she has brought he begins to laugh as the pram is way too small for Curtis. This leads to Neeta getting angry and she snaps. Neeta says Curtis is no longer her responsibility. A few seconds later, Neeta's phone begins to ring and it is Grace, who is currently on the run from the police. She begs Neeta to bring Curtis to her.

The following day Neeta asks Jesse whether she can look after Curtis. Jesse disagrees due to Neeta sapping at him the previous day. Jesse and Leela Lomax are outside of the Bean. Leela settles Curtis down for Jesse and she takes hi into the Bean. Leela asks Jesse to keep an eye on baby Daniel for a couple of minutes. Leela argues with Peri Lomax in the Bean as she is not in school. Jesse hears the argument and goes inside the Bean to see what is wrong. When they both walk out, baby Daniel's pram is missing. Neeta is seen taking the pram and calls Grace saying she has got Curtis. Neeta looks into the pram and she sees she has got the wrong baby.

The police arrive in the village and Neeta is in a panic. Leela Lomax suspects Louis Loveday to be the kidnapper as he is baby Daniel's father. As Leela and the police go to the school to speak to Louis, they ask him where he was during the time baby Daniel went missing, he says he was with Sally St Claire. As the police make their way to Sally's office, Neeta is in there with Sally and baby Daniel. Leela sees Sally with baby Daniel and the police suspect Sally as the kidnapper. Neeta intervenes and tells the police she had taken baby Daniel but it was an accident as she was following orders from Grace. The police arrest Neeta. Later on in the police station, DS Armstrong interviews Neeta and she explains to him that there has been a misunderstanding. DS Armstrong tells her that she has kidnapped a child which can lead to seven years in prison. DS Armstrong gives Neeta an ultimatum, tell him where Grace Black is then Neeta will be let off with no charge.

The following day Neeta is in the police station and DS Armstrong asks her again where Grace Black is. Neeta refuses to tell him as she will not betray her friend. Sally begs DS Armstrong to let her speak to Neeta and put some sense into her. Sally is let in to the interview room and she tries to talk some sense into Neeta. Neeta refuses to tell Sally and DS Armstrong where Grace is and she tells them that she will try her chances in court. Later on, Sally is in her office when she hears Neeta's phone ring. She picks it up and Grace is on the other end. She tells Grace that Neeta is going to prison. Grace feels bad for Neeta and she goes to the police station where Neeta is being taken away. Grace tells DS Armstrong to let Neeta go as it is her who they want.

The following day Neeta is printing out flyers to help Grace get out of prison. Adam is angry with Neeta when he sees what she is doing as he believes that Grace killed Darcy. Neeta tells Adam that Grace is a good person and that she could never kill someone. Adam resorts to threatening Neeta and he tells her that she should move out. Later on, Neeta is on duty in the school playground and Sally notices that there is something on Neeta's mind. Neeta tells Sally that Adam told her that she should move out of the flat. Sally assures Neeta that she will speak to Adam to get him to change his mind. Sally tries to get Adam to change his mind but it is too late as Adam already has Neeta's suitcase packed.

In the village Neeta bumps into Leela Lomax, Tegan Lomax and Courtney Campbell. Neeta tells Leela that she is very sorry for taking Daniel and assures her that it was a mistake. Leela accepts her apology. Sally sees Neeta in the village wither suitcase and tells Sally that she has not searched for a new place to stay. Sally offers Neeta a place at her house to stay and Neeta happily accepts. In April 2017 Sally and Neeta move into 5 Oakdale Drive as there an infestation in their home. In June Neeta made moves back in with Mac after them getting back together.

On a holiday, in Ibiza, with Ellie Nightingale, Holly Cunningham, Tom Cunningham, Alfie Nightingale, Hunter McQueen, Prince McQueen, Neeta falls in love with Hunter, despite her initial rejection, resulting in the two sleeping together on the holiday. Despite Hunter continuously professing his love, Neeta remained adamant that their love can never be as student/teacher sexual relationships are illegal. However, on many occasions, Neeta has admitted that she loves Hunter. Mac's constant interference, however, causes Neeta to reject Hunter multiple times. This results in Mac feeling angry and betrayed by Neeta as he thought she loved him and felt disgusted by the affair. This leads Mac to blackmail Neeta, threatening to expose her relationship with Hunter to the police. In this time Mac abuses Neeta and attacks Hunter. eventually tells Sally – in a frantic attempt to stop her from taking Neeta – about the affair which lands Neeta in jail (later bailed).

All of this tensions climaxes at Jade Albright's special assembly where Mac unintentionally starts a fire. This occurs when angrily shouting to Neeta, expressing his frustration towards her betrayal, Neeta shows Mac a sketch drawn by Hunter, of the couple (Neeta and Hunter) as 'warriors of love'. Furious, Mac sets alight the drawing of Neeta and Hunter, resulting in a catastrophic explosion at the school, endangering the life of many Hollyoaks residents including Jack Osborne, Peri Lomax and Lily Drinkwell

As Mac and Neeta try to escape from the destroyed Hollyoaks High, Neeta falls in a hole after talking to Mac about where it went wrong and why Hunter is the one for her. As she hangs for her life with Mac holding unto her, desperately trying to save her, Hunter shouts "I love you," to Neeta to which she replies "I Love You Too." This angers Mac, causing him to let go of Neeta. This results in the character plummeting to her death. Neeta is later declared brain dead at hospital and doctors say there is no chance of survival. Simultaneously teen Yasmine Maalik suffers from heart failure, Neeta is found to be a suitable match, and is on the organ donor register. This results in a heart transplant, thus saving the teenagers life. She appeared in a flashback in March 2019, where her killer Mac Nightingale is killed by Breda and Neeta's murder is finally avenged.

== Sally St. Claire ==
Sally St. Claire, played by Annie Wallace, made her first appearance on 29 October 2015. The character and casting was first announced via an article in the Guardian, by Paris Lees, and her character and story details released on 20 October 2015. Sally arrived at Hollyoaks High as Patrick Blake's (Jeremy Sheffield) appointed future replacement, but they soon locked horns, and Sally took over as headmistress. Sally was described as having a "no-nonsense attitude" and arrived at Hollyoaks High to "seek out the bad apples and make them into crumble." It was also said that she had come to the village with "an ulterior motive."

== Diego Salvador Martinez Hernandez De La Cruz ==
Diego Salvador Martinez Hernandez De La Cruz, played by Juan Pablo Yepez, made his first appearance on 16 November 2015. The character and casting were announced on 4 October 2015. Diego is Myra McQueen's (Nicole Barber-Lane) boyfriend from Alicante. He comes to Chester following Myra, and is under the belief that she is the "Countess of Chester".

== Dr. Berrington ==
Dr. Berrington, played by Tupele Dorgu, made her first on screen appearance on 30 December 2015. The character and casting was announced on 12 December 2015. Dr. Berrington will be a recurring character who is introduced after one of the show's present regular characters falls unwell and has to go to hospital. Her first patient is Jade Albright (Kassius Nelson), who is believed to have cancer. On 26 January 2016, Dr. Berrington revealed to Jade that she has Hodgkin's lymphoma. Over a month later, Alfie Nightingale (Richard Linnell) had an appointment with Dr. Berrington after he found a lump on his armpit. A few days after Alfie had a biopsy, Dr. Berrington revealed that his Hodgkin's lymphoma had returned. Dr. Berrington appears again to reveal the results of Jade and Alfie's chemotherapy. Jade's chemotherapy worked while Alfie's chemotherapy did not. Dr. Berrington is seen for the final time informing Jade that her cancer has returned, and appears in the episode where Jade dies from her illness.

== Other characters ==
Character	Date(s)	Actor	Circumstances
Delivery Man	7 January	Giles Ford	A delivery man who brings stock for The Loft. After finding out that he has not brought enough stock he goes to leave in his truck, only to find that Dylan Jenkins (James Fletcher) has left the air out of the tyres.
Police Officer	8 January	David Chafer	A police officer who arrives at the log cabin after Leela Lomax (Kirsty-Leigh Porter) calls the police after finding out that Cameron Campbell (Cameron Moore) was responsible for her parents' deaths. Leela tells the police officer that she called the police by accident so the officer leaves.
Doctor Crowe	14 January	Cally Lawrence	Doctor Crowe is a doctor who talks to Jason Roscoe (Alfie Browne-Sykes) about his eating disorder. She recommends that he visits an eating disorder clinic.
D.C. Franks	15 January – 10 February	Grant Burgin	D.C. Franks is a police officer from Dee Valley CID who ispeaks to Patrick Blake (Jeremy Sheffield) after Maxine Minniver (Nikki Sanderson) is reported missing. Patrick Blake is stopped by traffic officers and they see Maxine and they call DC Franks for back-up. DC Franks arrives and spots Maxine in Patrick's car D.C. Franks arrests Patrick for the kidnap. He takes Maxine's statement for domestic abuse that had happened prior to the abduction, although he does not get enough evidence to formally charge Patrick, he tells Maxine that he is confident they can build a case however DC Franks fails to build a case so no further action is taken. He later arrives at the hospital, after Maxine accidentally breaks her ribs, as Darren Osborne (Ashley Taylor Dawson) makes a false police report that it was Patrick who injured Maxine. After the report is found false, D.C. Franks arrests Darren on suspicion of perverting the course of justice and charges him for it.
Annika Smith	16 January	Jamie Hampson	Annika Smith is a journalist who interviews Darren Osborne (Ashley Taylor Dawson) about his new taxi firm, Daz Cabs.
Hutton	16 January	Jai Armstrong	Hutton is a prison guard who escorts Will Savage (James Atherton) to the toilets after he fakes an illness during his appeal hearing. Will attacks him during the fire that he set, although Hutton is able to escape and warn Dirk Savage (David Kennedy) that Will has escaped.
Zarif	19 January – 2 March	Sushil Chudasama	Zarif is a counselor at the eating disorder clinic that Jason Roscoe (Alfie Browne-Sykes) goes to. He later gives Jason leaflets informing him about body dysmorphic disorder. After Jack Osborne (Jimmy McKenna) tells Zarif that Jason has hid food, Zarif tells Jason to stay away from Leon. After Leon faints from some fat-burning pills, Leon and Jason lie to Zarif that it was Jack who supplied to them to them. Zarif tells Jason that he will be monitored more closely following Leon's death. Following Leon's death, Jason admits to Zarif that Jack did not give them the pills. Zarif also supervises a family therapy session with Jason and Ziggy Roscoe (Fabrizio Santino).
Nurse 1	21 January	Gabrielle Fernie	A nurse who tests John Paul McQueen (James Sutton) for HIV. She tells him that he has tested negative for HIV.
Nurse 2	21 January	Damien Hasson	A nurse who tests Ste McQueen (Kieron Richardson) for HIV. He tells him that he has tested positive for HIV.
Mr Tennant	22 January	John Draycott	Mr Tennant is a banker who has Porsche McQueen (Twinnie-Lee Moore) arrested by D.S. Geoff Thorpe (James Bradshaw) after she impersonates Mercedes McQueen (Jennifer Metcalfe) and tries to withdraw money from her account.
Chelsea	22 January – 18 February	Amy-Jane Ollies	Chelsea is a stripper who impersonates Mercedes McQueen (Jennifer Metcalfe) and withdraws money from her account. She later tells Lockie Campbell (Nick Rhys) that she withdrew the money under the orders of Freddie Roscoe (Charlie Clapham). Chelsea is later assaulted by Grace Black (Tamara Wall), who frames Freddie for it. Chelsea later tells Lindsey Butterfield (Sophie Austin) that it was not Freddie who assaulted her; however she does not reveal to Lindsey who did, causing her to pay Chelsea to leave. Chelsea later visits Freddie's flat after an appeal to find her, but she talks to Joe Roscoe (Ayden Callaghan) instead, believing him to be Freddie. She leaves after she figures out that he is not, but she is scared when she sights Grace causing Joe to defuse the situation and give her more money to leave.
Mr James	23 January	Hywel Morgan	Mr James is Freddie Roscoe's (Charlie Clapham) solicitor who shows him paperwork of him buying Mercedes McQueen's (Jennifer Metcalfe) share of The Loft.
D.I. Yousaf	2 February	Oliver Gatz	D.I. Yousaf is a police officer from the Organised Crime Unit who investigates Trevor Royle's (Greg Wood) flat after Tom Cunningham (Ellis Hollins) tips him off that there are drugs there. Dylan Jenkins (James Fletcher) overhears this and moves them to Jack Osborne's (Jimmy McKenna) house, where D.I. Yousaf finds them and arrests Jack. Jack is later released with a caution.
Guard	2 February	James Mair	A guard outside Will Savage's (James Atherton) hospital room. He covers for Kim Butterfield (Daisy Wood-Davis), Tegan Lomax (Jessica Ellis) and Celine McQueen (Sarah George) when they take a break in there. He also allows Nico Blake (Persephone Swales-Dawson) to visit Will.
D.S. Masters	4–5 February	Rachel Logan	D.S. Masters is a police officer from Dee Valley Major Incident Team who interviews Will Savage (James Atherton) after he attacks Cindy Savage (Stephanie Waring). Will tells her that Nico Blake (Persephone Swales-Dawson) pushed him off the hospital roof, but D.S. Masters does not take it down as an official statement. After Will dies, she interviews Dirk and arrests Nico for murder but does not get enough evidence to charge her.
Doris	4 February	Alice Barry	Doris is an elderly lady who is at a senior's party that Holly Cunningham (Amanda Clapham), Phoebe McQueen (Mandip Gill) and Robbie Roscoe (Charlie Wernham) attend. She dances with Robbie and gives Holly and Phoebe advice about men.
Judge Mackintosh	6 February	Debra Stewart	Judge Mackintosh is a judge who awards Patrick Blake (Jeremy Sheffield) joint custody of Minnie Minniver.
Kevin Johnson	9 February	Geoffrey Lumb	Kevin Johnson is an environmental officer who inspects the boarding house after Patrick Blake (Jeremy Sheffield) reports it. He finds damp in Maxine Minniver's (Nikki Sanderson) bedroom.
Doctor Owen-Setty	10 February	Julia Sandiford	Doctor Owen-Setty is a doctor who confirms that Ste McQueen (Kieron Richardson) is HIV positive. She also tells him more about the disease and the treatments that he may require.
Counsellor	11 February	Nathan Sussex	A counsellor who talks to Ste McQueen (Kieron Richardson) and John Paul McQueen (James Sutton) after Ste tests positive for HIV.
Rita Horn	11 February – 28 July	Anita Vettesse	Rita is a social worker who allows Maxine Minniver (Nikki Sanderson) custody of Minnie Minniver after Maxine has her ribs broken. Following Minnie's operation, Rita conducts an investigation to confirm that Maxine is suitable for care, she confirms that Maxine is. When Patrick Blake (Jeremy Sheffield) sets Maxine up, Rita takes Minnie into protective custody. Rita is present at Minnie's emergency custody hearing. Rita also gives evidence in another custody hearing for Minnie. When Tegan Lomax (Jessica Ellis) is arrested, Rita transfers care of Rose Lomax to Leela Roscoe (Kirsty-Leigh Porter).
Sonographer	12 February	Lou Conran	A sonographer who conducts a baby scan for Ste McQueen (Kieron Richardson) and Sinead Roscoe (Stephanie Davis).
Mr Cook	13 February	Barry Shannon	Mr Cook is a school governor who is on a committee who decides whether John Paul McQueen (James Sutton) should be reinstated as a teacher.
Dan	17 February	Nate Fallows	Dan is Chelsea's brother who meets with Freddie Roscoe (Charlie Clapham) and Lindsey Butterfield (Sophie Austin) to collect the appeal money.
Mel	20 February	Natalie Armstrong	Mel is a stall owner who Darren Osborne (Ashley Taylor Dawson) attempts to chat up.
Leon Harris	24–27 February	Edward Firth	Leon is another patient at the eating disorder clinic that Jason Roscoe (Alfie Browne-Sykes) goes to. After seeing Leon hide some food, Jason does the same. Leon later gives Jason some fat-burning pills. Due to the pills, Leon later collapses from a heart attack and dies.
Delivery Driver	9 March	John May	A delivery driver who delivers some stock to The Loft.
Rotherford	12 March	Cameron Jack	Rotherford is a drug dealer and Cameron Campbell (Cameron Moore) and Lockie Campbell's (Nick Rhys) stepfather. Cameron and Lockie visit him pretending to be police officers and steal money off of him. After Rotherford recognises Cameron, they fight, but Cameron and Lockie are able to get away with the money.
Doctor Abraham	16–17 March	Badira Timimi	Doctor Abraham is a doctor who briefs Peri Lomax (Ruby O'Donnell) on the abortion process. When Darren Osborne (Ashley Taylor Dawson), Cameron Campbell (Cameron Moore) and Tom Cunningham (Ellis Hollins) show up to the clinic under the belief that Peri is having an abortion, Doctor Abraham tells them that it was only a meeting.
Judge	18 March	Sarah Thurstan	A judge who presides over the emergency custody hearing for Minnie Minniver. Initially she allows Patrick Blake (Jeremy Sheffield) temporary custody, but when Darren Osborne (Ashley Taylor Dawson) interrupts the hearing and says that it was his fault that Minnie was left alone, the judge changes her decision.
Miss Clifford	24 March	Joanna Bond	Miss Clifford is a solicitor whom Tom Cunningham (Ellis Hollins) meets with in the hope of finding some legal reason to stop Peri Lomax (Ruby O'Donnell) from aborting their baby. As the baby is unborn Miss Clifford tells Tom that there is nothing the system can do for him.
Judge	27 March	David Bowen	A judge who tells Phoebe McQueen (Mandip Gill) that she will not be getting bail.
D.S. Kenway	1 April	Ben Crowe	D.S. Kenway is a police officer from Dee Valley Public Protection Unit who Diane Hutchinson (Alex Fletcher) approaches to report the baby swap. Diane refuses to make a statement to DS Kenway when DS Kenway tells her that Social Services would be involved.
Mr King	1 April – 30 June	Adam De Ville	Mr King is a solicitor who Maxine Minniver (Nikki Sanderson) hires to represent her in her custody case. After hearing that he has never lost a case Diane Hutchinson (Alex Fletcher) also hires him so she can vie for full custody of Dee Dee Hutchinson and Rose Lomax. They later meet and he tells Diane that there is no guarantee that he will win her case. When Diane is arrested for the kidnap of Rose, Mr King acts as her alibi.
Mr O'Farrell	3 April	John Webber	Mr O'Farrell is a school governor who checks the school after Patrick Blake (Jeremy Sheffield) returns from his leave of absence.
D.S. Morrison	6 April	Ged McKenna	D.S. Morrison is a police officer from Dee Valley CID who Darren Osborne (Ashley Taylor Dawson) goes to report Patrick Blake (Jeremy Sheffield) for the assault on Cindy Savage (Stephanie Waring). D.S. Morrison does not believe Darren due to the numerous false allegations that Darren has made against Patrick in the past. Darren breaks into Patrick's flat to find some evidence to prove Patrick is responsible but D.S. Morrison arrests Darren for breaking and entering. D.S. Morrison gives Darren a police caution.
Mr Davis	14 April	Barnaby Edwards	Mr Davis is a loan broker who visits Porsche McQueen (Twinnie-Lee Moore) and Lockie Campbell (Nick Rhys) when they request a loan. Due to their poor credit history he decides against giving them one.
Registrar	21 April	Shameen Ahmad	A registrar who marries Ziggy Roscoe (Fabrizio Santino) and Leela Lomax (Kirsty-Leigh Porter).
Mr Foster	22–23 April	Patrick Bridgman	Mr Foster is a supply man who goes to deliver new stock to Esther's Magic Bean, however Kim Butterfield (Daisy Wood-Davis) lies to him saying that the cafe has already gotten a new supply. Esther Bloom (Jazmine Franks) then calls him so he can deliver the stock, and upon noticing her he tells Esther that it was Kim was rejected his delivery.
Midwife	22 April	Mary Duffy	A midwife who performs a baby scan on Peri Lomax (Ruby O'Donnell).
D.I. Boswell	24 April	Ray Emmett Brown	DI Boswell is a police officer from Dee Valley CID who speaks to Phoebe McQueen (Mandip Gill) and Porsche McQueen (Twinnie-Lee Moore) over the disappearance of Theresa McQueen (Jorgie Porter). He later questions Sienna Blake over the incident but he fails to arrest anybody so he closes the case.
P.C. Richards	29 April	Samantha Barron	PC Richards is a police officer from the Immediate Response Unit. She attends Kath Butterfield's (Mikaela Newton) care-home after the police receive a report saying Kim Butterfield has damaged property. PC Richards arrives at the care home Kim Butterfield (Daisy Wood-Davis) assaults PC Richards. PC Richards then arrests Kim and Kim gets charged for assaulting a police officer.
P.C. Stuart Brooks	4–22 May	Stephen Fletcher	PC Stuart Brooks is a police officer from the Immediate Response Unit at Dee Valley Police. PC Brooks arrests Harry Thompson (Parry Glasspool) after a witness places him at the scene where Ste McQueen (Kieron Richardson) was assaulted. He later arrests Aiden (Joseph Cocklin) and Kyle Bigsby (Mitchell Hunt) after Zack Loveday (Duayne Boachie) reports them for the crime. Harry is released from bail with no further action and PC Brooks charges Aiden and Kyle. He later interviews Darren Osborne (Ashley Taylor Dawson) after Maxine Minniver (Nikki Sanderson) disappears, he also assists her off of the church roof after she decides not to commit suicide.
D.S. Jackson	7 May	Jason Furnival	DS Jackson is a police officer from Dee Valley CID who arrests and interviews Porsche McQueen (Twinnie-Lee Moore) after she is found to have Diane O'Connor's (Alex Fletcher) stolen money. Porsche is released without charge due to insufficient evidence to charge her.
Guard	8 May	Claire Eden	A guard who searches Grace Black (Tamara Wall) and Reenie McQueen (Zöe Lucker) after a drugs tip-off. After she finds drugs in Reenie's moisturiser she sends them both for a drugs test.
D.S. White	13 May	Mark Fleischmann	D.S. White is a police officer from Dee Valley CID who arrests and interviews Dr. Charles S'avage (Andrew Greenough), Lindsey Butterfield (Sophie Austin), Kim Butterfield (Daisy Wood-Davis) and Celine McQueen (Sarah George) after Mariam Andrews (Helen Lederer) is found dead in Dr. S'avage's office. After the autopsy report comes back identifying a heart attack as the cause of death, D.S. White ends the investigation.
Adjudicator	20–21 May	Delroy Brown	An adjudicator who is present at the custody hearing for Minnie Minniver. He listens to Darren Osborne (Ashley Taylor Dawson) after he changes his statement about leaving Minnie alone. After hearing further evidence, the adjudicator gives full custody of Minnie to Patrick Blake (Jeremy Sheffield).
Social Worker	22 May	Sara Sadeghi	A social worker who transfers custody of Minnie Minniver from Maxine Minniver (Nikki Sanderson) to Patrick Blake (Jeremy Sheffield).
Psychiatrist	25 May	Jackie Knowles	A psychiatrist who talks to Maxine Minniver (Nikki Sanderson) following her suicide attempt.
James Brett	29 May – 10 June	Ben Mars	James Brett is a social worker who supervises a session between Sienna Blake (Anna Passey) and Nico Blake (Persephone Swales-Dawson). He later pays Sienna a visit after Nico overdoses on painkillers.
Josh	29 May – 16 June	Rob Taylor-Hastings	Josh is a man who buys a painting off of Celine McQueen (Sarah George) for £3000, under the assumption that she is Mariam Andrews (Helen Lederer). He later buys another item off of Celine, before asking her on a date, however Cameron Campbell (Cameron Moore) claims to be her boyfriend, so he leaves. Celine later attempts to get the painting back by seducing Josh, but her plan fails when Cameron hears Josh making snide remarks about him. Josh later goes to a bar, where he ends up kissing Tegan Lomax (Jessica Ellis), however, when he arranges a second date with her Celine lies to him that Tegan is mentally unstable, so Josh stands her up and later gives Celine a bouquet of flowers inciting jealousy from Tegan.
P.C. Ryan Turner	2 June 2015 – 26 April 2016	Myles Keogh	P.C. Ryan Turner is a police officer from the Immediate Response Unit who arrests and questions Reenie McQueen (Zöe Lucker) after she is framed for a robbery by Porsche McQueen (Twinnie-Lee Moore). He releases Reenie after she is given a false alibi by Cleo McQueen (Nadine Mulkerrin). He later arrests Ste McQueen (Kieron Richardson) after Ste assaults him during an argument with Cameron Campbell (Cameron Moore). PC Turner gives Ste Hay a fixed penalty notice.
Reporter	29 June	Elianne Byrne	A reporter who, during a press conference, hounds Tony Hutchinson (Nick Pickard) under the belief that he kidnapped Rose Lomax. Due to her questions he reveals that Diane Hutchinson (Alex Fletcher) borrowed his car, leading to her arrest.
Minister	7 July	Helen Hobson	A minister who speaks during Phoebe McQueen's (Mandip Gill) funeral.
Dan	9–13 July	Jason Lewis	Dan is a physiotherapist who helps Joe Roscoe (Ayden Callaghan) in his recovery after he is paralyzed from the waist down. He tells Joe that he should not let himself believe that he will be walking in time for the birth of his child.
Receptionist	10 July	Rachel Edwards	A receptionist at the clinic where Mercedes McQueen (Jennifer Metcalfe) goes to have an abortion.
Midwife	14 July	Rebecca Root	A midwife at an antenatal class that Tom Cunningham (Ellis Hollins), Peri Lomax (Ruby O'Donnell) and Leela Roscoe (Kirsty-Leigh Porter) attend.
P.C. Devon	27 July	Leigh Symonds	P.C. Devon is a police officer from Merseyside Police who interviews Scott Drinkwell (Ross Adams) in Southport after it is discovered that Rose Lomax is there. PC Devon later assists DS Thorpe in the arrest of Tegan Lomax.
Magistrate	28 July	Jeffrey Longmore	A magistrate who sentences Tegan Lomax (Jessica Ellis) to four weeks in prison after she kidnaps Rose Lomax.
Ailsa Malcolm-Hutton	6 August	Herself	Ailsa Malcolm-Hutton is a woman who suffers from motor neurone disease. She meets with Patrick Blake (Jeremy Sheffield) and Maxine Minniver (Nikki Sanderson) in an attempt to give Patrick a more positive outlook on his condition.
Sarah	11 August	Jessica May Buxton	Sarah is a sonographer who performs a baby scan on Peri Lomax (Ruby O'Donnell).
Nurse	17 August	Kaitlin Howard	A nurse who sees Cleo McQueen (Nadine Mulkerrin) after she has unprotected sex with Pete Buchanan (Kai Owen).
Reverend Cox	17–18 August	Barry McCarthy	Reverend Cox is a reverend who is due to christen Hannah Hay-O'Connor. After witnessing an argument between Ste McQueen (Kieron Richardson), Sinead O'Connor (Stephanie Davis) and Scott Drinkwell (Ross Adams) he refuses to christen her. Scott then manages to convince him to christen Hannah.
Undertaker	4 September	Sam Alexander	An undertaker in charge of Dylan Jenkins' (James Fletcher) funeral. When he makes a remark about Dylan being buried in a dress, Trevor Royle (Greg Wood) assaults him. The undertaker later reports this to Jason Roscoe (Alfie Browne-Sykes).
Mr Booth	9 September 2015 – 22 June 2017	Charlie De'Ath	Mr Booth is a school governor who is present at the vent where Patrick Blake (Jeremy Sheffield) gives a speech highlighting the fundraising for the school's special needs unit. He later talks with Patrick after finding out that he is suffering from motor neurone disease and implies he should retire, until Maxine Minniver (Nikki Sanderson) passionately defends him. Mr Booth later has a meeting with Sally St. Claire (Annie Wallace) after the board of governors feel that her suspending of Peri Lomax (Ruby O'Donnell) was based on personal reasons. He defends her, until Sally resigns in front of the governors. Mr Booth is later in charge of Neeta Kaur's (Amrit Maghera) disciplinary hearing. After a written statement from Lily Drinkwell (Lauren McQueen) and a defence from Sally, Mr Booth allows Neeta to keep her job, however he puts both her and Sally on probation.
Margaret Smith	17 September 2015 – 30 November 2016	Claire Prempeh (2015); Suzette Llewellyn (2016)	Margaret is the adoptive mother of Lisa Loveday (Rachel Adedeji). When Lisa was young, Margaret told her that her parents and younger brother died in a car accident. She has cared for Lisa since then. Margaret later shows up after she hears that Joanne Cardsley (Rachel Leskovac) has been looking for her. She blackmails Joanne for money so that she and Lisa can start up again someplace new. They arrange a place to exchange the money, but Joanne shows up with Zack Loveday (Duayne Boachie) and Sonia Albright (Kiza Deen), with Simone (Jacqueline Boatswain) and Louis Loveday (Karl Collins) following shortly thereafter. Margaret is arrested for kidnapping Lisa, when Simone sees her being led out of the station she slaps her just as Lisa arrives. Lisa later visits Margaret in an interview room demanding to know why she was abducted. Margaret revealed her reasons, before being transferred for further prosecution. Lisa visits Margaret in prison when she feels rejected by Simone. Simone visits Margaret in prison on 30 November after she reads a letter she wrote for Lisa. Margaret accuses Simone of physically abusing Lisa when she was younger, which Simone denies. Margaret said that is what Joanne said, and Simone figures out that Lisa's kidnap by Margaret was staged by Joanne so she could get closer to Louis. Margaret is shocked and disgusted over what Joanne did. Simone believes it should be Joanne in prison and not Margaret, and gives her permission to contact Lisa due to these recent revelations.
Elaine	17 September	Katie Males	Elaine is the stepmother of Sonia (Kiza Deen) and Jade Albright (Kassius Nelson). In a flashback episode it was shown that Elaine was abusive toward Sonia and favoured Jade. Her behaviour led to Sonia running away.
Headmistress	17 September	Joyce Branagh	A headmistress at the school where a young Lisa Loveday (Serrayah Rowe) attended. She told Simone Loveday (Jacqueline Boatswain) that Lisa was not at the school when Simone came to pick her up.
Sergeant	17 September	Christopher Hollinshead	A sergeant who questions Louis Loveday (Karl Collins) over the disappearance of Lisa Loveday (Rachel Adedeji). The Detective Sergeant made Louis his prime suspect after he believed strongly that Louis had involvement in Lisa Loveday's kidnap.
Teenage Lisa	17 September	Alexis Simone	Teenage Lisa is featured in a flashback, where she meets with Sonia Albright (Asiatu Koroma) and gives her her locket.
Teenage Sonia	17 September	Asiatu Koroma	Teenage Sonia is seen in a flashback, where she meets with Lisa Loveday (Alexis Simone) and is given her locket.
Young Lisa	17 September	Serrayah Rowe	Young Lisa is seen in a flashback where she is shouted at by Simone Loveday (Jacqueline Boatswain), and later being taken by Margaret Smith (Claire Prempeh).
Lucy	25 September	Lauren Trickett	Lucy is the president of the LGBT Society at the local university. She goes to The Hutch to confront Tony Hutchinson (Nick Pickard) about his homophobic comments that Esther Bloom (Jazmine Franks) and Scott Drinkwell (Ross Adams) recorded. Tony then later decides to agree with a Pride festival in the village.
Doctor Ball	8–29 October	Liz Jadav	Doctor Ball is a doctor who has an appointment with Peri Lomax (Ruby O'Donnell) to discuss the possibility of her suffering from post-natal depression. Peri later admits to Doctor Ball that she is not suffering from post-natal depression.
Nurse	14 October	Nicola Holt	A nurse at the care home where Kath Butterfield (Mikaela Newton) is at. She calls Lindsey Roscoe (Sophie Austin) when Kim Butterfield (Daisy Wood-Davis) locks herself in Kath's room. When Lindsey arrives, the nurse tells her that she has contacted the authorities.
Young Kath	23 October	Nieve Bushell	Young Kath is seen in a flashback where Lindsey Butterfield (Rosa Tinsley) pushes her into the lake.
Young Lindsey	23 October	Rosa Tinsley	Young Lindsey is seen in a flashback where she pushes Kath Butterfield (Nieve Bushell) into a lake.
Judge	27 October	Andrew Readman	A judge who hands Cameron Campbell (Cameron Moore) a two-year driving ban and a suspended sentence after reading a victim impact statement from Leela Roscoe (Kirsty-Leigh Porter).
John Moxen	3 November 2015 – 28 January 2016	Roy McCrerey	John Moxen is a solicitor who amends Patrick Blake's (Jeremy Sheffield) will so that Maxine Minniver (Nikki Sanderson) is the sole recipient. He later meets with Patrick to discuss signing his flat over to Maxine, but he reveals that Maxine will also have to accept the signing over of the flat. He later tells Maxine, Sienna Blake (Anna Passey) and Nico Blake (Persephone Swales-Dawson) that Patrick had left everything to Maxine. When Sienna confronts him over this, he tells her that Patrick insisted upon it.
Dr Graham	4 November	Wendy Patterson	Dr Graham is a doctor who conducts an ultrasound on Mercedes McQueen (Jennifer Metcalfe) after she can no longer feel her baby moving. She tells Mercedes and her half-brother John Paul McQueen (James Sutton) that the baby has died, and that they will give Mercedes a drug to induce labour.
Father Andrew	5 November	Felix Trench	Father Andrew is a priest who blesses Gabriel McQueen after he is stillborn.
Shaun	6–10 November	Dominic Vulliamy	Shaun is a photographer who, after seeing an intimate picture of Theresa McQueen (Jorgie Porter), offers to take more photos of her. She accepts his offer, and they do a photoshoot in her room, where Shaun says that if she takes off more clothes she'll get more money. Although, Theresa initially rejects his offer, she later calls him and agrees to it, due to her going to the shoot, Theresa misses dinner with her boyfriend, Zack Loveday (Duayne Boachie). After Theresa reveals to Sonia Albright (Kiza Deen) that Shaun bullied her into the photoshoot, they take Darren Osborne (Ashley Taylor Dawson) to retrieve the USB stick with the photos on and destroy it. Shaun later arrives to threaten Sonia and Theresa, but after Sonia threatens him with calling the police he leaves.
Registrar	17–18 November	David Phelan	A registrar who marries Pete Buchanan (Kai Owen) and Reenie McQueen (Zöe Lucker).
D.S. Drake	19 November – 14 December	Patricia Potter	D.S. Drake is a police officer from the Public Protection Unit who visits Jack Osborne (Jimmy McKenna) after Jade Albright (Kassius Nelson) disappears, because it is suspected that she is with Pete Buchanan (Kai Owen) who has recently been accused of sexual crimes. She also interviews Reenie McQueen (Zöe Lucker) and Porsche McQueen (Twinnie-Lee Moore) over Pete's sexual crimes. She later tells Reenie that Pete has been run over, as well as arresting Darren for the crime after a witness places his taxi at the crime scene and Darren cannot account for his whereabouts the night before. She later charges him for attempted murder. Rennie later calls D.S. Drake over to talk to Cleo McQueen (Nadine Mulkerrin), but Cleo refuses to talk to her. DS Drake later arrests and charges Reenie after Pete tells her that she ran him over, as a result of this Darren thinks he is cleared, but D.S. Drake tells him that he is still a suspected accomplice. D.S. Drake also listens to Cleo when she finally reports Pete, and as a result of her statement, she arrested him for having sex with a minor. After receiving Cleo's full statement, she charges Pete for the crime.
Reporter	24 November	John Edon	A reporter who arrives at the Loveday household to take a photo of them after Simone Loveday (Jacqueline Boatswain) wins the Mother of the Year Award. After taking the photo, he is approached by Theresa McQueen (Jorgie Porter). Theresa deliberately tarnishes Simone's reputation by saying that Simone had recently visited Trevor Royle (Greg Wood) in prison.
Seth	27 November	Wilson James	Seth is a man who Tegan Lomax (Jessica Ellis) meets up with on a date. Seth hits on her and plans to take her home, but they are interrupted by Ziggy Roscoe (Fabrizio Santino), who claims that he does not want to see Tegan get used.
Doctor Tarry	1 December	Sandra Cole	Doctor Tarry is a psychiatrist who Celine McQueen (Sarah George) talks to about her eating disorder.
Doctor Barnaby	17 December	Andrew Hall	Doctor Barnaby is a doctor who performs various medical tests on Kim Butterfield (Daisy Wood-Davis) after she reawakens from her coma.
Doctor Redmond	29 December	Benjamin Fisher	Doctor Redmond is a doctor who runs tests on Jade Albright (Kassius Nelson) after she collapses in the village. He asks her to come back the next day, so they can perform a biopsy on her.
Stephanie Starlet	31 December 2015 – 30 December 2016	Herself	Stephanie Starlet is a drag queen who appeared in The Loft during the New Year's Party. She reappears the following year as the DJ.
