= Adedeji =

Adédèjì
- Gender: Male
- Language: Yoruba

Origin
- Origin: Nigerian
- Meaning: The crown has become two.
- Region of origin: South West Nigeria

Adédèjì sound is a Nigerian given name and a surname. It is a male name and of Yoruba origin, which means "The crown has become two." This distinctive and culturally rich name is often linked to royal families, symbolizing a legacy of dignity and strength.

== Notable people with the name include ==
- Fredrick Kúmókụn Adédeji Haastrup (1820–1901), Nigerian traditional ruler.
- Hubert Ogunde (1916 – 1990), Nigerian actor, playwright, theatre manager, and musician.
- Davido (born 1992), Nigerian singer, songwriter and record producer.
- Zacch Adedeji (born 1978), Nigerian accountant, tax administrator, and public officer.
- Rachel Adedeji, Nigerian British singer and actress.
- Olamide (born 1989), Nigerian rapper, singer, songwriter, and record executive.
- Noah Adedeji-Sternberg (born 2005), Nigerian German footballer.
- Remi Adedeji (born 1937 (age 86–87)), Nigerian writer.
- Sesan Adedeji (born 1996), Nigerian cricketer.
- Adebayo Adedeji (born 1930), Nigerian politician.
- Yinka Adedeji (born 1985), Nigerian footballer.
- Adedeji Oshilaja (born 1993), English footballer.
- Adedeji Adeleke (born 1956) Nigerian Businessman.
