= Rachel Adedeji =

British singer and actress

- Born: August 22, 1991 (age 35); Barking, London, England
- Occupations: Singer; actress
- Years active: 2008–2009, 2014–present
- Label: RAM Records
- Television: The X Factor; Hollyoaks
- Spouse: Jason Finegan (m. 2015)
- Children: 1

Rachel Seun Temitope Adedeji (born 22 August 1991) is a Nigerian-British singer and actress. She became the fourth contestant eliminated on sixth series of The X Factor in 2009, having previously appeared on the fifth series. From 2016 to 2020, she appeared in the Channel 4 soap opera Hollyoaks as Lisa Loveday. She currently stars as Persephone in Hadestown at the Lyric Theatre.

== Career ==
Adedeji began her career as a singer, beginning singing at the age of eight, later studying musical theatre in college. She performed in many musical productions and had a role in the musical Mamma Mia!.

In 2008, Adedeji entered the fifth series of The X Factor, where she made it to bootcamp. Adedeji later returned to the programme for the sixth series, where she became the fourth contestant eliminated.

On 21 March 2016, it was announced that Adedeji had joined the Channel 4 soap opera Hollyoaks as Lisa Loveday, the long-lost daughter of Simone Loveday (Jacqueline Boatswain) and Louis Loveday (Karl Collins). She made her on-screen debut in April 2016. For her performance as Lisa, she was longlisted for Best Actress at The British Soap Awards in 2017. On 30 August 2017, it was announced that Adedeji was expecting her first child and would take maternity leave. Her return to the programme aired on 13 November 2018. In June 2020, it was announced that Adedeji had quit the programme, with her final scenes airing later in the year.

In October 2021, Adedeji portrayed the role of April Lewin in an episode of the BBC soap opera Doctors.

== Filmography ==
Year	Title	Role	Notes
2008	The X Factor	Herself	Fifth series; eliminated at bootcamp
2009	The X Factor	Herself	Sixth series; 9th place
2009	The Xtra Factor	Herself	11 episodes
2009	Ant & Dec's Christmas Show	Herself	1 episode
2016	Lorraine	Herself	1 episode
2016–2020	Hollyoaks	Lisa Loveday	Series regular
2020	Hollyoaks Later	Lisa Loveday	2020 special
2021	Doctors	April Lewin	Episode: "Deadname"
2022	R.I.P.D. 2: Rise of the Damned	Avatar Roy	
2022	The Almond and the Seahorse	Billie	
2022	Whitstable Pearl	Sky Tomlin	Episode: "Babylon"
2023	Champion	Yemi	8 episodes
2023	Dreaming Whilst Black	Funmi	6 episodes
2023	Alice & Jack	Donna	
2024	Death in Paradise	Monette Gilbert	Episode: "#13.8"

== Stage ==
Year	Production	Role	Venue	Ref
2014	Thriller Live	Lead Female	UK Tour/ Lyric Theatre	
2015	Jesus Christ Superstar	Mary Magdalene	UK/European Tour	
2024	Passing Strange	Mother	Young Vic	
2026	Hadestown	Persephone	Lyric Theatre	

== Personal life ==
In 2015, Adedeji married Jason Finnegan; she announced she was pregnant with the pair's first child in 2017, taking maternity leave from Hollyoaks.

In 2020, Adedeji took to social media to open up about racism she has encountered while working on Hollyoaks. She stated she was told "You're all the same" by a make-up artist, and said that black actresses on Hollyoaks were "forced to drastically change their hair" after being told viewers wouldn't be able to tell them apart, and that in her four years on the soap, she had only worked with one black director. She added: "Working at Hollyoaks is mostly positive, but the experiences I have encountered are a constant reminder of how difficult it is being a black woman in the industry. I am no longer standing for it." A few days later, the soap launched an investigation into her claims, with producers stating that they were "deeply shocked and saddened" by the issues that she had addressed. The investigation included a multi-step action plan to root out any further instances of racism.

== Awards and nominations ==
Year	Organisation	Award	Work	Result	Ref.
2017	The British Soap Awards	Best Actress	Hollyoaks	Longlisted	
2017	Inside Soap Awards	Sexiest Female	Hollyoaks	Longlisted	
