= Deji Oduwole =

Canadian football player (born 1987)

No. 94
- Position: Defensive lineman

Personal information
- Born: August 23, 1987 (age 39); Coquitlam, British Columbia, Canada
- Listed height: 6 ft 3 in (1.91 m)
- Listed weight: 265 lb (120 kg)

Career information
- University: Calgary; Saint Mary's
- CFL draft: 2009: undrafted

Career history
- 2010–2011: Winnipeg Blue Bombers
- Stats at CFL.ca (archive)

Adedeji Olanrewaju Oduwole (born August 23, 1987) is a Canadian former professional football defensive lineman for the Winnipeg Blue Bombers of the Canadian Football League (CFL). He signed with the Blue Bombers as an undrafted free agent on March 30, 2010. He played college football for the Saint Mary's Huskies in 2005 before transferring to the University of Calgary to play for the Dinos from 2007 to 2009. Oduwole is also an active member of the community.

After his playing career, Oduwole became a chef, and appeared on season 7 of Beat Bobby Flay, where he won the first round, but lost to Bobby Flay in the second round.
