= Rachel Hardy =

Fictional character from Hollyoaks

- Hollyoaks character
- Portrayed by: Jennifer Brooke
- Duration: 2015–16
- First appearance: 26 October 2015
- Last appearance: 29 March 2016
- Introduced by: Bryan Kirkwood
In-universe information
- Occupation: Barmaid

Rachel Hardy is a fictional character from the British soap opera Hollyoaks, portrayed by Jennifer Brooke. She made her first appearance on 26 October 2015. Rachel was introduced alongside her fiancé Nathan Nightingale (Jared Garfield) and his family as a new family unit that would run the local pub. Executive producer Bryan Kirkwood revealed that he introduced Rachel and the Nightingales to bring a sense of community to Hollyoaks. Brooke characterised Rachel as free-spirited and not caring about what others think of her. She gets itchy feet in the village as she wants to go travelling with Nathan. Rachel and Nathan were portrayed as being a perfect couple and childhood sweethearts. However, their relationship is tested several times throughout Rachel's stint on the soap, including when Nathan kisses Porsche McQueen (Twinnie-Lee Moore) and when Rachel hides Alfie Nightingale's (Richard Linnell) cancer returning from Nathan. Rachel was then killed off in a car explosion caused by Holly Cunningham (Amanda Clapham) and she last appeared on 29 March 2016. Rachel's departure had not been announced prior and Garfield later explained that the character was always meant to be short-lived. Rachel's death impacts Nathan and was used to show other sides of his character. Rachel's death was seen as emotional and tragic by critics.

== Casting and characterisation ==
22-year-old Rachel is Nathan's free-spirited fiancée, billed as a girl next door who has a heart of gold but isn't afraid to speak her mind. She and Nathan were childhood sweethearts and she now has a strong connection with his family, feeling loved and accepted by the close-knit clan. The blonde tomboy gets on particularly well with Nathan's stepmum Neeta, even though they're completely different. The only real source of tension is her love of body art, which Nathan isn't too keen on. But even with such a happy life, it won't take long for Rachel to get itchy feet in Hollyoaks...

— Digital Spy on Rachel's characterisation (2015)

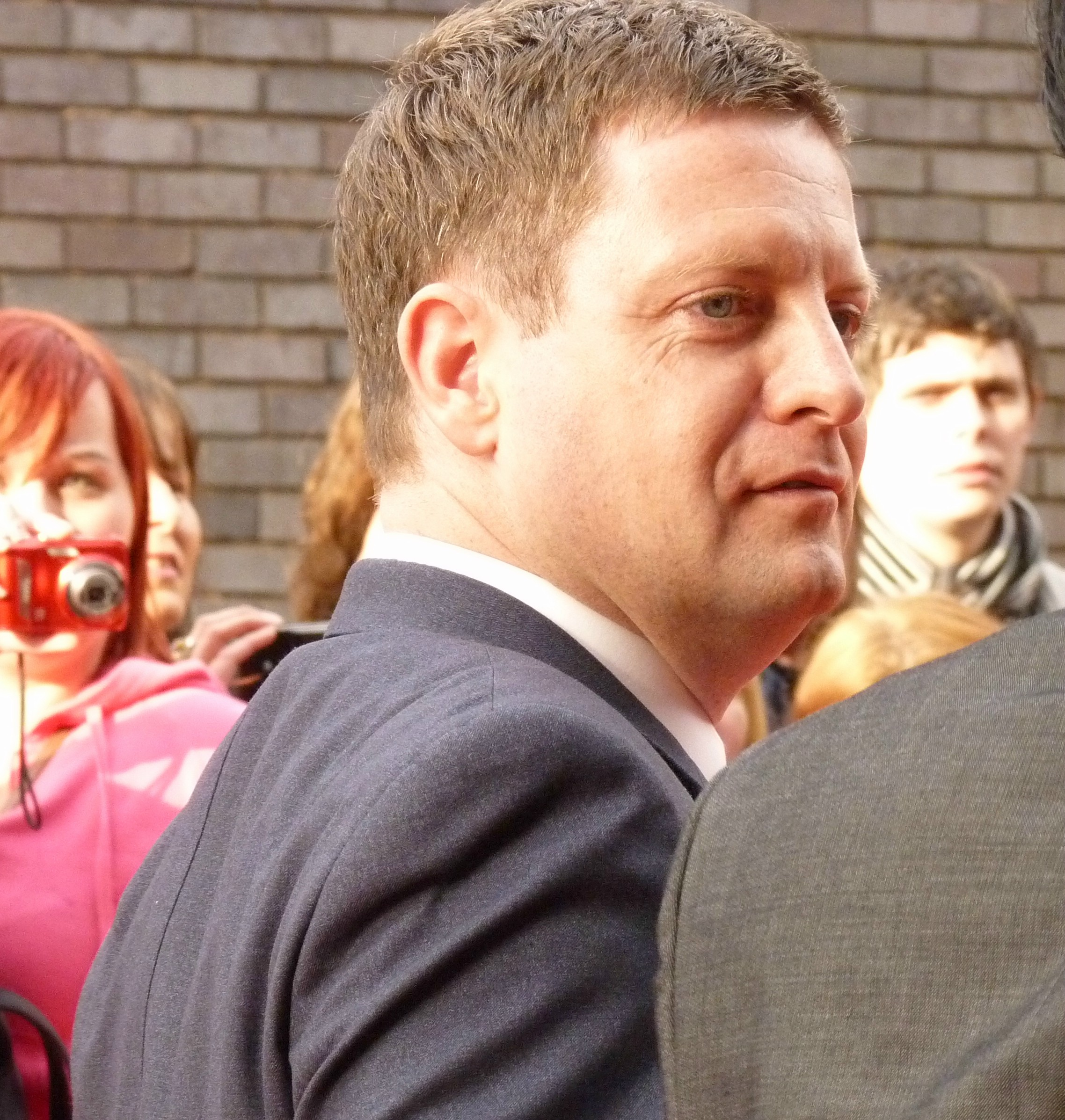
Executive producer Bryan Kirkwood (pictured) brought in the Nightingale family to create a sense of community on the soap.

On 21 September 2015, it was announced that six new cast members would be joining the cast of Hollyoaks as the Nightingale family as part of a "shake-up". The Nightingales were labelled as an "exciting new family" that would take over the running of the local pub The Dog in the Pond. One of the members was Rachel Hardy, portrayed by Jennifer Brooke, who arrives with her fiancé Nathan Nightingale (Jared Garfield), Nathan's siblings Ellie (Sophie Porley) and Alfie Nightingale (Richard Linnell), their father Mac Nightingale (David Easter), who had already appeared on the soap as a guest earlier that year, and Mac's girlfriend Neeta Kaur (Amy Maghera). Easter teased that the family would be moving in with "a bit of a bang" and that there would be drama due to Mac still being married to established character Cindy Cunningham (Stephanie Waring). Hollyoaks executive producer Bryan Kirkwood explained that he had introduced the family to "create a sense of community" in the soap, adding, "We're delighted with the Nightingales. They're a family of warm, rich, loving characters - a very positive group. What we're keen for them to do is to make friends and for them to reach out and cross over with different clans". To promote the family, Hollyoaks released a series of videos titled "Meet the Nightingales" to explore the characters and their portrayers.

Rachel's role was a series regular. Brooke made her first appearance as Rachel on 26 October 2015. Rachel and the Nightingale family's fictional backstory revealed that they are from Brighton. Rachel was reported to be the childhood sweetheart and "soulmate" of Nathan who "quickly gets itchy feet in the village". Brooke described Rachel as "quite cool" and "free-spirited" and not caring about other people's opinions, which Brooke liked about the character. The actress explained that Rachel fits in well with the Nightingale family and called Rachel and Nathan "a match made in Heaven" and "best friends". Brooke revealed that the couple "adore" each other and attributed their relationship working so well being due to the fact that they were best friends first. Brooke teased that Rachel, along with the rest of the family, would have some "big" storylines, which she was excited about. Brooke also explained that Rachel thinks of Hollyoaks as a waiting room before she goes to travel the world, and that Rachel somewhat likes the village but does not think she needs to settle there as she believes that she is not staying. Brooke also teased that there could be more members of the Nightingale family to arrive in the village.

== Development ==
Ellie and Nathan move to Hollyoaks for a fresh start and their initial storylines see them having relationship issues, with their relationship later becoming strained. Garfield revealed that some characters would show romantic interest in Nathan but he would not reciprocate as he is "bound for life" to Rachel, adding that Nathan is "absolutely mad about her and she's mad about him. They're deeply in love and dedicated to each other". Garfield enjoy working with Brooke and explained that they built up a great working relationship and spent time together preparing for scenes and talking about their characters as most of their scenes were together.

Ellie tries to push Nathan together with Porsche McQueen (Twinnie-Lee Moore) at the Christmas bar crawl, which infuriates Rachel and leads to a fight between the couple due to Ellie's manipulation. Following the falling out, Nathan ends up getting drunk and going to the McQueen household with Porsche, where they kiss. The next day, Rachel gifts Nathan an apology present as she feels guilty for arguing with him the night before, but they are interrupted by Porsche, who has come to return Nathan's wallet. Rachel is furious to learn about Nathan's cheating and decides to get revenge on him by pouring water on him when he is sleeping, giving him a "rather unpleasant wake-up call". Nathan tries to make things up to Rachel by hiring a Limousine to take them to the airport but Rachel tells him that she is still hurt, which threatens their holiday.

The couple are able to move on from Nathan's cheating but Rachel later begins to have doubts about their relationship and fears that they are drifting apart. Rachel turns down a permanent teaching assistant job at Hollyoaks High in order to go to travelling with Nathan, but she then ponders over her decision when she realises that Nathan may not not want the same thing anymore. Rachel becomes upset and ignores Nathan's calls and he realises that he needs to prove himself to save their relationship, so he asks Diego Salvador Martinez Hernandez De La Cruz (Juan Pablo Yepez) to give him Spanish lessons to show that he wants to go travelling to South America with Rachel. Sophie Dainty from Digital Spy questioned whether it would be enough to ease Rachel's doubts. When Diego catches Nathan showing Myra the sexy underwear that he bought for Rachel, he gets the wrong idea and tells Rachel that Myra and Nathan are having an affair.

Nathan later begins preparing for their trip to South Africa and is excited for it, but Rachel is put into a difficult situation when she finds out that Alfie's cancer has returned when she overhears him confiding in Jade Albright (Kassius Nelson). A "shocked" Rachel "desperately" tries to help Alfie and offers to go to the hospital with him for his biopsy and urges him to tell his family, but Alfie is determined for his family to not know, which forces Rachel to keep the truth from Nathan. Alfie wants to keep the truth from Nathan in order to not "stand in the way" of the couple's travel plans. Rachel accompanies Alfie to get his biopsy results, where it is confirmed that Alfie's Hodgkin lymphoma has returned, and he refuses to change his stance and makes Rachel promise to not reveal the secret until she and Nathan have travelled. Rachel faces backlash when it is revealed that she kept Alfie's cancer secret and a shocked Nathan harshly rejects her when she begs him to hear her side of the story, which upsets her. Nathan then tells Rachel that she should go travelling alone and so Rachel packs her bags and prepares to leave, with it appearing as the "end of the road" for the couple.

Rachel and Nathan then get back together and leave to go travelling, but on the way there they are involved in a car crash with Holly Cunningham (Amanda Clapham) and Cleo McQueen (Nadine Mulkerrin). Nathan – who was fixing their car at the roadside after experiencing engine troubles – is able to jump out of the way but Rachel is still inside the car when Holly drunkenly crashes into it. It had previously been reported that Holly would get in a drink-driving crash, but it was not revealed that it would involve Nathan and Rachel until transmission. The fate of the characters were not revealed immediately and viewers had to wait until the next episode to see the cliff-hanger resolved, although spoiler pictures showed Nathan trying to help Cleo. It was also reported that an explosion would occur. Daniel Kilkelly from Inside Soap teased that Holly's dangerous driving could cause issues for Nathan and Rachel's happiness. It was later reported that one of the four characters would be killed off.

Rachel was then confirmed to be the victim and she made her last appearance on 29 March 2016 after being killed off, becoming the first member of the Nightingale family to leave the soap. Following the crash, Nathan becomes worried when he cannot seem to wake Rachel up, but she eventually comes round and tells him to save Cleo and Holly. However, the structure falls down and Nathan's car explodes; he tries to put the flames out but is unsuccessful and Rachel dies. The cast filmed the scenes from 4pm to 4am and had to deal with a lot of rain from Storm Imogen. Garfield enjoyed being part of the stunt but called it challenging and "physically draining", but was glad to be part of the stunt as he still felt new to the soap. He added that it "was a real team effort between cast and crew to get all the material we wanted and to make the stunt look really strong. It was just such a pleasure".

"It gives Nathan's story a massive, massive turn from this point on. He's always been a really positive and spirited character, so this is when that is hugely challenged. He hasn't experienced any trauma like this in his life, so this is when everything changes dramatically for him. It's a real sucker punch that will really change everything for the Nightingales.".

— Garfield on the impact of Rachel's death (2016)

Discussing Rachel's death, Garfield revealed that he and Brooke had known from "day one" that Rachel would be moving on "in some way", adding, "It was some way along the process that we received the full story, but we'd been gearing up for it from the start. Although that doesn't mean it was easy to see her go!" Garfield explained that producers had set Rachel and Nathan as an ideal couple and thus her death would really shock the audience and Nathan. Garfield revealed that he would miss Brooke, calling her a "a really good and honest actor who works really hard" and a good friend that he and the other Nightingale cast members would miss.

In the aftermath of Rachel's death, Nathan grieves for Rachel and is "struggling" for the first time of his life. Garfield found filming the scenes challenging but interesting, and explained that it allowed him to learn more about Nathan's character. He added that there is now a "massive void" in Nathan's life due to Rachel being gone. Cleo initially takes the blame for the accident and Nathan blames her for Rachel's death and even kidnaps her. However, Garfield explained that Nathan really blames himself as he wonders whether he could have done more to save Rachel, which is making getting over her death the most challenging. Garfield teased that Nathan would become darker through his grief and that his "fragility" and vulnerability would be shown to the character. He then begins to distance himself from his family and spends time with Holly, unaware that she actually caused the accident. Months later, Holly is exposed as being behind the accident and there is a police investigation, but the charges are later dropped and Nathan forgives Holly. Following her departure, Brooke returned to the Hollyoaks set several times as she had friends that lived in Liverpool.

== Storylines ==
Rachel arrives with her fiancé, Nathan Nightingale (Jared Garfield), and his family to take over Hollyoaks' local pub The Dog in the Pond. Rachel enjoys working behind the bar but sees Hollyoaks as a stepping stone for her and Nathan before they go travelling. Rachel books for her and Nathan to go on holiday to Marbella for Christmas, which makes Nathan's sister, Ellie Nightingale (Sophie Porley), jealous. Rachel becomes friends with Porsche McQueen (Twinnie-Lee Moore) and invites her on to a Christmas Bar Crawl with Ellie and Nathan. During the night, Ellie is manipulative and spills a drink on Rachel so she has to change. When Rachel returns, she sees Porsche and Nathan in a compromising position (as they were playing a game where they had pass an object using only their mouths) and furiously declares their engagement to be over. Nathan goes home with Porsche and kisses her. Rachel initially apologises to Nathan for getting angry but when she finds out about the kiss she is angry and pours water on Nathan when he is sleeping. Rachel forgives him after he allows her to kiss as many Spanish waiters as she wants when they are on holiday, and the two leave for Marbella.

Rachel rejects a teaching assistant job at Hollyoaks High in order to pursue her goal of travelling with Nathan, but she worries that they may be drifting apart. Nathan tries to show his commitment by trying to take Spanish classes. Rachel finds out that Nathan's half-brother, Alfie Nightingale (Richard Linnell), has cancer and she urges him to tell his family, but he does not want to and forces Rachel to keep it a secret. Rachel reluctantly does so and accompanies him to the hospital. Nathan breaks up with Rachel when he finds out the truth but gives her a second chance after some persuasion from Alfie. They then leave for their trip to South America but have some car troubles on their way. They stop at the roadside and Nathan tries fixing the car, but a drunk Holly Cunningham (Amanda Clapham) crashes into them and knocks Rachel unconscious. Rachel's legs are trapped under the dashboard when the car catches on fire. Nathan tries to get a firefighter to put the fire out but the car explodes and kills Rachel. Nathan and his family are devastated by Rachel's death. Holly's friend, Cleo McQueen (Nadine Mulkerrin), initially takes the blame for the crash to prevent Holly from getting in trouble for drunk driving but the truth later comes out.

== Reception ==
Following the announcement of Rachel and the Nightingales, Daniel Kilkelly from Digital Spy called the new characters "exciting" and speculated which "soaptastic drama" they would each bring. Kilkelly also their introduction "a new era" of the Dog in the Pond. Matthew Wright from Liverpool Echo joked that the soap was "bracing" itself for the family's arrivals and wrote that fans could "look forward" to the new family appearing on the soap. Sophie Dainty from Digital Spy believed that Rachel was put in an "increasingly difficult situation" when Alfie urged her to keep the return of his cancer a secret from Nathan. Kilkelly believed that Rachel was put in an "impossible position". Kilkelly later called Nathan's rejection of Rachel a "heartbreak". Kilkelly's colleague, Claire Crick, wrote that Rachel and Nathan had a "perfect romance".

Kilkelly advised viewers to prepare themselves for "emotional scenes" and believed that Rachel's life was in "jeopardy" after the car crash. Following Rachel's death scene, Sarah Ellis from Inside Soap joked, "at least Hunky Nathan is single again!" and that "at least" Rachel was not murdered by The Gloved Hand Killer. Ellis also called Rachel's death "tragic" and a "shocker" due to the soap keeping her "grisly exit under wraps". She noted how viewers were "stunned" that Rachel had been killed off just months after debuting, but acknowledged that the character's fate was "sealed from the start". Kilkelly expressed that he was "in mourning" for "poor Rachel" and wrote "Hollyoaks certainly knows how to deliver epic stunts that we won't forget in a hurry". Kilkelly also called Rachel's death "tragic" and believed that it was an example of Hollyoaks keeping viewers on their toes. Charlotte Tutton from OK! reported how viewers were left "gobsmacked" following Rachel's "shock death" and called the scenes emotional and a tragedy. Sophie Dainty from Digital Spy wrote that her heart broke for Nathan when Rachel was killed off.

In 2017, Nicole Douglas from OK! reported that some fans were speculating on social media that mysterious new character Milo Entwistle (Nathan Morris) was connected to Rachel and was getting close to Holly to enact revenge for Rachel's death. The following year, when discussing theories for how Holly would exit Hollyoaks, Kilkelly speculated that a "vengeful relative" of Rachel could "pop up to finally see justice served". Kilkely explained, "Rachel was such a short-lived character that we never really did learn much about her family, giving the writers free rein to introduce a crazed relative on a mission for payback. And we all know Hollyoaks loves a crazed relative..." Kilkelly also wrote "remember her?" in reference to Rachel and believed that Holly causing Rachel's death was one of Holly's biggest storylines.
