= Rick Spencer (Hollyoaks) =

Fictional character from Hollyoaks

- Hollyoaks character
- Portrayed by: Victor Gardener
- Duration: 2014–15
- First appearance: 13 May 2014
- Last appearance: 23 October 2015
- Introduced by: Bryan Kirkwood
In-universe information
- Occupation: Bar owner Bar manager
- Sons: Robbie Roscoe; Jason Roscoe

Rick Spencer is a fictional character from the British soap opera Hollyoaks, played by Victor Gardener. The character and casting was announced in April 2014 and Rick made his first appearance on 13 May 2014. Rick was introduced as a bar owner and upon his debut he is revealed to be the father of established characters Jason Roscoe (Alfie Browne-Sykes) and Robbie Roscoe (Charlie Wernham). Gardener character Rick as being slippery and being able to talk his way out of trouble. Rick's storylines have included flings with Nancy Hayton (Jessica Fox) and Sienna Blake (Anna Passey), being attacked, his money-making schemes, trying to rob the pub, supplying painkillers to Nancy to manipulate her and his troubled relationships with his sons. Gardener made an unannounced departure on 2 January 2015, when Rick was murdered by "The Gloved Hand Killer" as part of a long-running serial killer storyline for Hollyoaks. Lindsey Butterfield (Sophie Austin) was revealed to be the killer, and Hollyoaks executive producer Bryan Kirkwood revealed that he believed Rick was the biggest clue to the mystery due to Rick's murder taking place when Lindsey's life fell apart. Rick reappeared in a flashback on 23 October 2015 which saw Lindsey murder Rick by injecting him with potassium chloride in the hospital.

== Casting ==
In April 2014, it was announced that Victor Gardener would be joining the British soap opera Hollyoaks as new regular character and bar owner Rick. It was reported that bar owner Rick would meet existing characters Jason Roscoe (Alfie Browne-Sykes) and his girlfriend Holly Cunningham (Amanda Clapham) when they run away from the Hollyoaks village after finding a dead body, with underage Holly getting a job in Rick's bar. It was also teased that there would be a "surprise" when Rick appears in the Hollyoaks village due to some characters being "shocked" to see him, although details of the storyline were kept secret from viewers until airing. Gardener's first appearance as Rick aired on 13 May 2014.

== Development ==
=== Introduction ===
Soon after his debut, it is revealed that Rick is the father of Jason and his twin Robbie Roscoe (Charlie Wernham). There is conflict as Rick finds Holly stealing from the till and Rick also tries to come on to her, which they both tell Jason. Jason tells Rick he wants to stay with him in Southport but Rick is not happy with the idea. Rick brings Jason home to the Hollyoaks village and tells him that he will sort Sonny Valentine (Aaron Fontaine) out; he then finds and punches Sonny, which leaves him unconscious. Rick also sees the twins' mother Sandy Roscoe (Gillian Taylforth) and Jason asks Rick to stay and meet Robbie; Rick tells Jason he is going to get some beers, but it is clear to the audience that he initially does not intend on returning.

=== Fling with Nancy ===
In one storyline, Nancy Hayton (Jessica Fox) cheats on her husband Darren Osborne (Ashley Taylor Dawson) with Rick. Hollyoaks initially led viewers to believe that Nancy had had sex with Robbie, but it was revealed to be Rick instead when she was seen confronting Rick over the secret at the closing scene of the 3 July episode. Nancy then has a difficult time as she tries to prevent Darren from finding out, and when Nancy's enemy Sienna Blake (Anna Passey) starts to suspect that something happened between Nancy and Rick, Sienna seduces Rick herself in an attempt to find out the truth and get ammunition in order to blackmail Nancy to stop her relative Tom Cunningham (Ellis Hollins) from testifying against her. Rick ends up blackmailing Nancy. Fox told All About Soap that Nancy is worried about the repercussions of the fling, explaining, "let's face it, Rick did blackmail her last time, so that is an indication of what kind of bloke he is. What happened between them was a complete moment of weakness on Nancy's part - she was in a bad place with Darren, and Rick was just there. There is definitely a worry that Rick will still tell Darren, so Nancy knows that she has to keep him sweet." Fox predicted that things would turn out badly for Nancy due to cheating with Rick and that she would face difficult times, adding, "Nancy has a dirty secret, and we all know secrets in a soap have a nasty habit of coming out in a public way!"

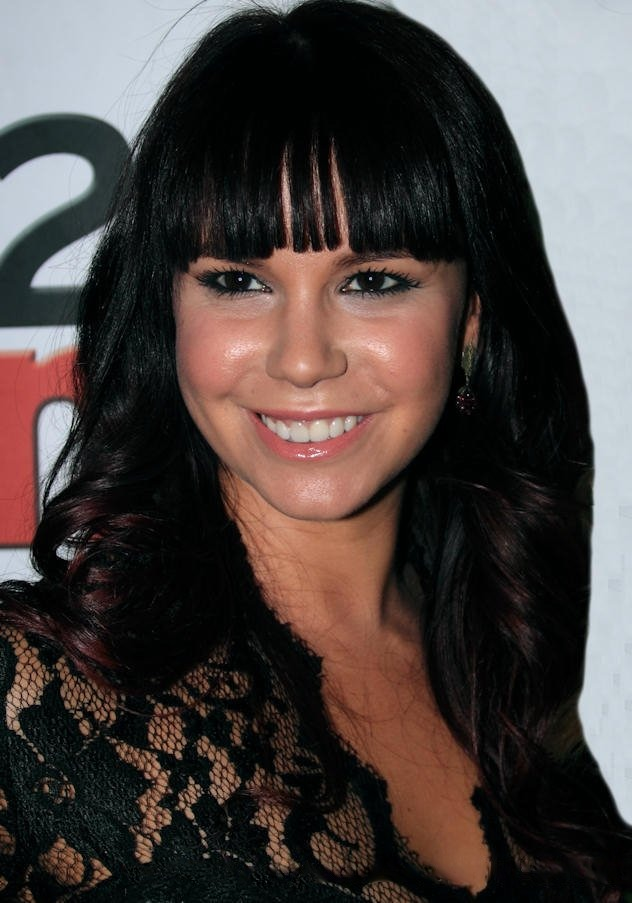
Jessica Fox plays Nancy, who has a brief affair with Rick

=== Money-making schemes ===
In July 2014, after waking up in "high spirits", Rick's mood changes after he is tracked down by his former acquaintance Gazza (Tomi May), who he owes money to and has been avoiding to evade paying the money back. Gazza then threatens to target Rick's sons if he does not pay in 24 hours, leading to Rick having to go "desperate measures" to get the money. That same month, Rick's life is in danger after he is attacked, which was noted in a BBC article reporting on research from Ofcom that Hollyoaks had become the most violent soap opera in the UK.

In an attempt to get money quickly, Rick signs Jason up for an amateur boxing match and Robbie is "roped in too" when Jason's opponent pulls out due to injury. Jason, who is struggling a lot with body dysmorphia, is very worried that the crowd will laugh at his appearance and slams a car bonnet on his wrist to get out of the match, but Rick insists on him going ahead with it due to their being too much riding on the match. Rick has secretly encouraged Cameron Campbell (Cameron Moore) to bet £7000 on Jason to win, and Rick tells Robbie that he needs to lose the fight as part of his deal with Cameron, although it was reported by Digital Spy that it was "anyone's guess as to whether everything will go as planned" due to Jason acting strangely on the day of the fight, which was broadcast on 1 December 2014. Discussing Rick's scheme, Gardener told Inside Soap that Rick is "always out to make money" and he had a "nifty" idea to guarantee getting money by making Jason win and betting on him to make money. Gardener explained that Rick has gotten Cameron involved as Rick knows the latter also has money issues, though the actor teased both characters had a "lot to lose if the fight doesn't go as planned". Jason ends up collapsing in the dressing room after the fight, with Gardener explaining that Jason being in front of a crowd of people on a public platform is Jason's "worst nightmare" and that it gets too much for him. The actor noted that Rick does not know at all about Jason's body issues.

Rick finds an opportunity when he overhears Nancy and Darren discussing the staffing of The Dog in the Pond pub, and he offers his services, leading to him being hired as pub manager, which he is surprised about. Rick convinces Cameron to rob the pub with him, which they do after Rick is left in charge of the pub and its takings. Gardener explained that Rick is "immediately up to no good" now that he has a job at the pub as he has access to the safe and keys, and he "coerces" Cameron into helping him rob the pub when Nancy goes out one night. However, as they are breaking in, Nancy and Leela Lomax (Kirsty-Leigh Porter) head back to the pub early. Gardener called Rick a "slippery character" who is good at "talking his way out of trouble", but he believed that Rick would not be able to "worm his way" out of the situation if he was caught by Leela and Nancy, and teased, "who knows what he might do..." Rick also dislikes Robbie's on-off girlfriend, Phoebe McQueen (Mandip Gill).

=== Death and aftermath ===
Nancy ends up becoming addicted to painkillers again and Rick supplies her with drugs in order to manipulate her. The storyline was a revisit of Nancy's painkiller addiction storyline from 2013, with Fox calling it "Nancy's re-addiction", noting that people with addictions have to live with their addictions as "it's not something that goes away". Of the plot, Fox explained that Rick is "manipulating Nancy to get what he wants out of their relationship and is also fuelling the addiction, so he becomes her supplier and she becomes increasingly reliant on him even though she really can't stand him. He moves himself in, he becomes totally involved in her life and she can't get rid of him because she needs the pills so badly. And that's going to become more and more of a thing where Nancy isolates herself as people with addictions do, from her family and her friends." Fox teased that on New Year's Eve, Nancy would become desperate for pills after being cut off by Rick, so she ends up stealing painkillers from the Roscoe household and passes out after taking too many; when she is found by Robbie, she blames Rick and Robbie angrily goes after Rick, resulting in a physical fight with Robbie's half-brother Joe Roscoe (Ayden Callaghan) punching Rick unconscious. Fox teased that Nancy would feel terrible over this and for possibly tearing Rick's family apart.

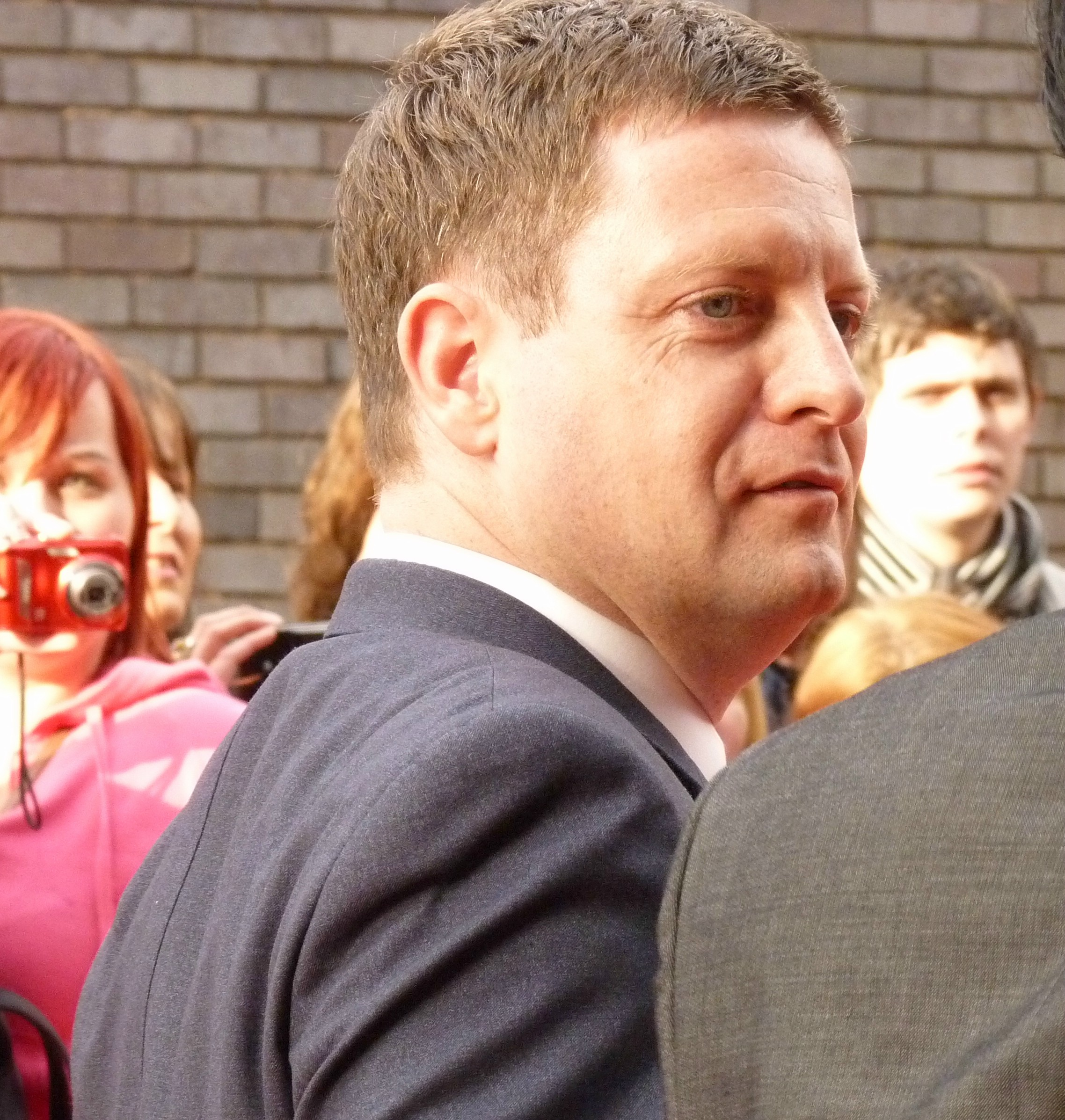
Executive producer Bryan Kirkwood (pictured) killed off Rick as part of a long-running storyline.

The events of the episode resulted in Rick being killed off, which had not been announced beforehand. The death aired in the first official episode of 2015 on 2 January of that year, although it originally aired on E4 on 31 December 2014, as a special hour-long New Years' Eve episode. In the storyline, Joe intervenes in Robbie and Rick's fight and punches Rick, leaving the latter in critical condition and being rushed to hospital; Rick regains consciousness but he is then injected with potassium chloride by an unidentified medical staff member dubbed "The Gloved Hand Killer". Rick is unable to be resuscitated and is pronounced dead, leading to Joe being arrested for murder. The death made Rick the first victim of the serial killer at the hospital – the Gloved Hand Killer – as part of a storyline that had been announced in November 2014 as part of a long-running serial-killer murder mystery storyline that would run throughout 2015. Bryan Kirkwood, Hollyoaks' executive producer, said that the idea for the Gloved Hand Killer storyline came when at a story conference where Kirkwood was worried that Hollyoaks was not balancing the storylines correctly; the idea for the Gloved Hand Killer storyline came from conversations between Kirkwood and Hollyoaks writer Steve Hughes discussing memories of "camp" soap operas from the 1980s. Kirkwood explained, "We have a hospital set populated with characters and primed for a big gothic plot. We love a mystery, but this story won't just be a whodunit, it will be a 'who's next?' packed with tension and plenty of red herrings." Hollyoaks built a new hospital set especially for the storyline. Rick's death also led to Gardener's departure from the show after over seven months.

Following Rick's murder, Robbie blames Joe for Rick's death as he is unaware that Rick was murdered by the Gloved Hand Killer, and he goes to visit Joe in prison. A funeral for Rick is held in January 2015, where Robbie is confronted by gangster Trevor Royle (Greg Wood) over Rick's debt due to Rick still owing Trevor money for Nancy's pills before his murder, leading to Trevor threatening Robbie to get him the money. The Glove Hand Killer was revealed in October 2015 during Hollyoaks' 20th anniversary week, with it being revealed that Lindsey Butterfield (Sophie Austin) is culprit, having murdered Rick, Will Savage (James Atherton), Mariam Andrews (Helen Lederer), Phoebe, Dylan Jenkins (James Fletcher), Ashley Davidson (Kierston Wareing) and Dr. Charles S'avage (Andrew Greenough), as well as believed to have killed Freddie Roscoe (Charlie Clapham), the brother of Joe, Robbie and Jason, who is in witness protection after Lindsay tried to murder him. Lindsay had been in a love triangle with Joe and Freddie, and Kirkwood explained that on the day of Rick's murder, Lindsay's affair with Freddie was revealed and her "controlled life descended into chaos". Kirkwood added, "That was the night that she spiralled out of control, and as a consequence it was the night of the first murder when Rick died. We felt very clearly that dangerous Freddie was almost the lure into the dark side that made Lindsey incapable of resisting this first murder." Kirkwood said the Hollyoaks team ensured that all five of the hospital staff members were always at the hospital during every murder, but he felt that the biggest clue to the mystery was that the night of Rick's murder "was the night that Lindsey's life went wrong". Rick reappeared in the episode airing on 23 October 2015 in a flashback which saw Lindsay murdering him.

== Storylines ==
When Jason Roscoe (Alfie Browne-Sykes) and his girlfriend Holly Cunningham (Amanda Clapham) run away from the Hollyoaks village, Holly starts working at Rick's bar despite being underage. When Jason sees Rick, he collapses, and he reveals to Holly in hospital that Rick is his father. Jason wants to stay with Rick in Southport but Rick brings Jason back to Hollyoaks, where he sees his other son Robbie Roscoe (Charlie Wernham) and his family. Rick has a brief fling with Nancy Hayton (Jessica Fox), who is married, and later blackmails her. He also has sex with Nancy's enemy Sienna Blake (Anna Passey). Rick is threatened by Gazza (Tomi May), who he owes money to. Rick convinces Jason and Robbie to have an amateur boxing match and tells Robbie he needs to lose the fight as he has convinced Cameron Campbell (Cameron Moore) to bet £7000 on Jason to win, meaning that Rick can get some of the money. Rick then becomes manager of The Dog in the Pond pub and tries robbing it with Cameron. Rick starts supplying Nancy with painkillers in order to manipulate her into moving in and be closer to. On New Years' Eve, Nancy steals painkillers from the Roscoe household and passes out, and she lies to Robbie that Rick gave them to her. Rick also forces Jason, who has an eating disorder, to eat food. Holly throws Rick out and Robbie fights with Rick; Robbie's half-brother Joe intervenes and punches Rick to the ground unconscious. Rick is rushed to hospital and whilst he is alone, he is injected with potassium chloride by an unknown person. Rick dies, becoming the first victim of the Gloved Hand Killer, who is months later revealed to be Robbie and Jason's sister-in-law Lindsey Butterfield (Sophie Austin).

== Reception ==
Following the announcement of the character, Tina Campbell from Metro wrote "Move over Fraser Black". Daniel Kilkelly from Digital Spy called Nancy's affair with Rick a "surprise" and a "Hollyoaks twist". Kilkelly also called Rick a "charmer" and noted how his mood soured when Gazza tracked him down. Kilkelly also noted how Rick took "desperate measures" to get Gazza to not target his sons. Kilkelly later dubbed Rick's murder a "dark twist" and "shocking events", and commented that Rick met an "untimely end" and that "his fate was sealed" when he was injected with potassium chloride. Alison Gardner from What to Watch noted that Rick was "the first character to fall prey to the [Gloved Hand] killer". Prior to Lindsay being revealed as Rick's killer, Kilkelly suspected that Lindsey could be the killer as she was part of the Roscoe family and hence "had seen that Rick's presence usually caused more harm than good"; he also thought that Lindsey's sister Kim Butterfield (Daisy Wood-Davis) could have killed Rick as revenge to the Roscoe family after being kicked out by Sandy. Kilkelly also speculated that Celine McQueen (Sarah George) could have murdered Rick as she had acted "arguably the most suspicious" in the episode of Rick's murder, as Jason had confided in her about Rick upsetting him when he tried to force feed him, and after Rick told her about his difficult history with Rick, Celine told him that things are sometimes better when parents leave, which occurred shortly before Rick was killed.

Reporting on the boxing storyline, Laura Withers from Inside Soap called Rick and Cameron a "Dodgy duo", and she also penned Rick as "crafty". Withers noted that Rick's "desperation" to get "quick cash" led to him taking "drastic action", which ends up causing "unintended consequences" when Jason collapses. She also noted that Rick was undeterred by this and remained "set on making a quick buck no matter what the cost". Withers also called Rick's plan to rob the pub a "cunning idea" and believed it was inevitable, though she also believed that it would not be as easy as Rick expects. Tina Miles from the Liverpool Echo called Rick "manipulative" and noted that Nancy blaming him after she stole the medication would have "disastrous consequences". In December 2016, following Gardener's debut on another soap opera EastEnders as Fred Cole, Sophie Dainty from Digital Spy noted how viewers recognised Gardener from Hollyoaks and that several viewers shared "their delight on Twitter at seeing him on screen again". Troy Nankervis from Metro also believed that Rick met an "untimely end".
