= Holly Cunningham =

UK soap opera character, created 1997

- Hollyoaks character
- Amanda Clapham as Holly Cunningham
- Portrayed by: Karis Sharkey (1997–2004); Lydia Waters (2008–2010); Wallis Day (2012–2013); Amanda Clapham (2013–2019)
- Duration: 1997–2000, 2002, 2004, 2008–2010, 2012–2019
- First appearance: 22 December 1997
- Last appearance: 23 January 2019
- Introduced by: Jo Hallows (1997, 2002, 2004); Bryan Kirkwood (2008, 2019); Emma Smithwick (2012)
- Spin-off appearances: Hollyoaks Later (2013)
- Wallis Day as Holly Cunningham
In-universe information
- Other names: Holly Hutchinson; Holly Roscoe
- Occupation: Student; Shop assistant
- Family: Cunningham
- Father: Lee Stanley
- Mother: Cindy Cunningham
- Stepfather: Tony Hutchinson; Alistair Longford; Mac Nightingale; Dirk Savage
- Half-brothers: Hilton Cunningham; Maddox Keane; Alfie Nightingale
- Husband: Jason Roscoe (2016)
- Grandfathers: Gordon Cunningham
- Grandmothers: Angela Cunningham; Sheila Stanley
- Uncles: Max Cunningham; Tom Cunningham
- Aunts: Dawn Cunningham; Jude Cunningham
- First cousins: Bethany Cunningham; Steph Cunningham-Lomax

Holly Cunningham (also Hutchinson, Longford and Roscoe) is a fictional character from the long-running Channel 4 soap opera Hollyoaks, most recently portrayed by Amanda Clapham.

Holly's first on-screen appearance aired on 22 December 1997, which was her birth set on Christmas Day, before departing in 2000. Holly made further appearances in 2002 and later in 2004, played by Karis Sharkey. In 2008, Holly returned to the serial played by Lydia Waters. In 2009, Holly played a minor role in the second series of Hollyoaks Later, and featured in the storyline of her mother Cindy (Stephanie Waring) and Tony Hutchinson's (Nick Pickard) wedding, despite Darren Osborne (Ashley Taylor Dawson) and Jacqui McQueen (Claire Cooper) teaming up to split the engaged couple up before the wedding. Waters then departed in 2010.

In November 2012, the character was reintroduced, now played by Wallis Day. Day as fifteen-year-old Holly appeared in the sixth series of Hollyoaks Later, in a dark storyline that featured Holly go on a trip to an isolated country mansion with Esther Bloom (Jazmine Franks) to celebrate Esther's eighteenth birthday, along with Holly's boyfriend Callum Kane (Laurie Duncan), Esther's girlfriend Tilly Evans (Lucy Dixon) and Tilly's strange and mysterious new housemate Jade Hedy (Lucy Gape). Shortly after, Day made her final appearance on 22 October 2013. The character was immediately recast, with actress Amanda Clapham taking over the role; she made her first appearance as Holly on 19 November 2013. Clapham departed on 13 September 2018 alongside Sophie Porley who portrays Ellie Nightingale. She made a brief return the following year on 23 January 2019, where she told Zack Loveday (Duayne Boachie) that she has feelings for him, leading to him leaving the village to reunite with her.

Some of Holly's storylines have included being in a relationship with Jason Roscoe (Alfie Browne-Sykes), taking legal highs and cannabis, being kidnapped by Trevor Royle (Greg Wood) and Ashley Davidson (Kierston Wareing), having an affair with Jason's twin brother Robbie Roscoe (Charlie Wernham), discovering Alfie Nightingale (Richard Linnell) was her half-brother, causing a car crash while intoxicated, which caused the death of Rachel Hardy (Jennifer Brooke), being raped by her boyfriend Nick Savage (Ben-Ryan Davies), and a relationship with Damon Kinsella (Jacob Roberts).

== Casting and development ==
In 2008, Lydia Waters auditioned for the role of Holly. She was one of 54 candidates up for the role of Holly, the character of which who had previously appeared in Hollyoaks between 1997 and 2001, with returns in 2002 and 2004, played by Karis Sharkey. After several audition stages at the shows studios in Liverpool, Waters was given the role of Holly and began filming in April 2008. She made her first appearance in June 2008. Speaking of Water's portrayal of Holly's character, a Channel 4 spokesperson stated: "She will be quite a stroppy eleven-year-old who knows her own mind — like her mum's character. There's a big storyline involving Max [Cunningham] at the end of June, and they will be involved in that".

=== 2012 return and recasting ===
In December 2011, Hollyoaks producer Emma Smithwick told Daniel Kilkelly of Digital Spy in an interview, "We've talked about Holly, but again, there have been a lot of new characters coming in and we'd quite like to keep the cast a bit more stable... Once we deliver a fuller character for Cindy, then the question of Holly would come into play". This indicated that there were no current plans to re-introduce Holly into the series.

In October 2012, it was announced that Holly would return on 14 November of that year, now played by Wallis Day. Kilkelly announced that the character would cause "mischief" upon her return, stating that she initially "seems to be a well-mannered and sophisticated 14-year-old at first glance. However, her true bratty nature is soon revealed and it seems that she could be a mini-Cindy". Cindy is unaware of Holly's resentment of her due to her unstable upbringing. Speaking of her casting, Day said: "I am thrilled to have been cast as Holly Cunningham, as I've been a fan of Hollyoaks for many years [...] Holly is a really exciting character with plenty of surprises up her sleeve, so you'd better watch to see what happens".

Stephanie Waring, who plays Holly's mother Cindy praised Day, saying she is "excited to work with her" and thinks she is going to "be a little bit of a mini-Cindy, but maybe even worse!" Waring expressed shock at some of the lines the character says and added that she would find it "interesting to see how the audience reacts to that, but I certainly like her". Waring also noted that "Wallis is actually older than Holly, so I'm not happy about having an 18-year-old daughter, because I don't look old enough! But obviously Holly is 14, so she's a lot younger than Wallis. I was 18 when I was playing Cindy as 15, so it's the same sort of scenario. Wallis reminds me of me, but she's a lot more beautiful than I was!"

When Day's portrayal of Holly first began appearing on screen, she was at first generally quite unpopular, and many viewers complained about the realism of an adult-looking 18-year-old playing a 14-year-old. Waring defended the recasting through social networking site Twitter, saying that it does not matter that she looks older than 15 as a lot of 15-year-olds look like adults. Waring added that if Hollyoaks wanted somebody who looked like Waters they would not have recast the character.

In October 2013, shortly after the sixth series of Hollyoaks Later that Holly was a main character in, it was announced that Wallis Day would be re-cast after less than a year of being on-screen as Holly. It was announced that the character would be replaced with Amanda Clapham taking over the role. Executive producer Bryan Kirkwood said: "We're very sad to see Wallis go but respect her decision. I felt Holly is too good a character to lose, so we have recast the role and fans will see her later this autumn." A show spokesperson added: "A decision was made to recast the role ahead of some major storylines for the character which will take Holly in a different direction. Wallis Day has been a popular cast member and we wish her every success in her future." Clapham made her first onscreen appearance on 19 November 2013.

== Storylines ==
=== 1997–2010 ===
Holly is conceived during her mother Cindy Cunningham's (Stephanie Waring) 16th birthday. Cindy keeps her pregnancy a secret from her parents. Holly's father Lee Stanley (Nathan Valente) is killed in a road accident shortly before her birth. After Holly is born on Christmas Day, a terrified Cindy abandons her inside a hospital canteen and desperately tries to carry on as normal. She returns home a few hours later and is told that her sister Dawn Cunningham (Lisa Williamson) has died of leukaemia. Cindy's parents, Gordon (Bernard Latham) and Angela Cunningham (Liz Stooke), find out about her secret pregnancy and force her into motherhood. Cindy struggles to adapt to life as a single mum and on one occasion, attempts to suffocate Holly, but her older sister, Jude (Davinia Taylor) stops her before any damage is done. The shock of the situation makes Cindy realise that she does genuinely love her baby.

When Cindy is forced to take Holly to work at The Loft with her, Holly falls safely asleep in the cloakroom, but later awakens and finds an ecstasy tablet, which she swallows. Holly is rushed to hospital and Cindy knows social services will take Holly out of her care, and so she concludes that she has no choice but to flee the country with her daughter. She takes Holly from hospital and they leave for the airport. Cindy and a four-year-old Holly return in May 2002. Cindy scams her brother Max Cunningham (Matt Littler) and Max's friend Sam "O.B." O'Brien (Darren Jeffries) out of their money. She and Holly then leave again. In 2004, Cindy and a six-year-old Holly return for Cindy's father Gordon and stepmother Helen Cunningham's (Kathryn George) funerals, along with her grandmother Angela.

In June 2008, Cindy and a ten-year-old Holly return from Spain for Max's wedding to Steph Dean (Carley Stenson). After the death of Max on his wedding day, Cindy and Holly decide to stay permanently in Hollyoaks. It is then revealed that prior to his death, Max left Holly £3,000 in his will, which can only be accessed after her eighteenth birthday, but left Cindy his treasured DVD collection, much to Cindy's annoyance. Cindy sends Holly to spy on Warren Fox (Jamie Lomas) after Louise Summers (Roxanne McKee) accuses her of having an affair with him.

On Holly's first day of school, Cindy forgets to pick her up, so Holly is taken in by a concerned Tony Hutchinson (Nick Pickard), but this angers Cindy as she assumes he is a paedophile after it becomes public knowledge that he slept with fifteen-year-old Theresa McQueen (Jorgie Porter), though Tony thought she was of age at the time. Cindy begins a relationship with Rhys Ashworth (Andrew Moss), but Rhys and Holly of ten argue. However, one day Holly apparently goes missing, although she is actually hiding from Rhys, who lures her out of hiding with an episode of University Challenge. Holly and Rhys end up striking a friendship, however, Cindy ends her relationship with him. Cindy's young half-brother and Holly's friend Tom Cunningham (Ellis Hollins) and Holly find out Mercedes Fisher (Jennifer Metcalfe) has been stealing food from Il Gnosh, which she begins selling for profit. The pair then expose her. Cindy begins to get close to Tony, who impresses both Cindy and Holly. Tony proposes to Cindy and they marry, after which, Holly, as well as Cindy, changes her surname to Hutchinson.

Holly is accidentally electrocuted at The Dog in the Pond by Darren Osborne's (Ashley Taylor Dawson) Christmas lights. Holly is not breathing, but Darren resuscitates her; he tells Cindy that she was resuscitated by Jake Dean (Kevin Sacre).

In February 2010, Cindy sees an advert for an under-twelves talent show and announces that Holly will be entering. Holly is not keen but agrees to do it, thinking that it will get her more attention from her mum. Holly then realises that Cindy has her own selfish motives for wanting her to win and overhears Cindy tell Tony that the talent show isn't important. Holly tries to talk to Tony's half-brother Dominic Reilly (John Pickard), who is preparing a meal in the kitchen, about how Cindy is treating her, but this distracts Dom from his cooking - he drops his pan of food on the floor and shouts at Holly, causing her to run off, feeling even more isolated and alone.

When Holly hears Cindy wants her to start at boarding school, she blames Tony for trying to get rid of her and is so upset and she runs away. After looking for her themselves Tony and Cindy have no choice but to phone the police. Holly watches the drama unfold from Darren's flat where it transpires she is hiding without his knowledge. Darren finds Holly in his flat and asked her to stay there while he gets a DVD, but he instead goes to get Cindy and Tony. However, when they get to Darren's flat she is gone. It later transpires she has moved to hide at Spencer Gray's (Darren John Langford) flat. Holly tells Spencer that she wants a new coat so they go out to buy her one. Holly waits in a disguise outside for Spencer but is recognised by Jake, who chases after her. During the chase she falls over and hits her head on the pavement, knocking herself unconscious. Jake takes Holly back to Cindy and is accused of kidnapping her; she is rushed to hospital where she falls into a coma. Holly eventually wakes up, but refuses to tell Cindy and Tony what had happened to her. Eventually, Holly comes to forgive Tony and Cindy and after talking to Tony at the hospital, Holly overhears Cindy and Tony talking about giving their marriage another chance. Holly admits that she loves them both and wants them in her life. A fully recovered Holly goes home a few days later with Tony and Cindy.

After Cindy splits from Tony, she quickly becomes engaged to rich but elderly pensioner Alistair Longford (Terence Harvey). On the wedding day, Cindy reassures Holly that she is only marrying him so Holly can have a better life. After the wedding the three of them all leave Hollyoaks together. When Cindy returns in 2011 as a widowed millionaire she tells Darren that Alistair is dead and that she left Holly in a boarding finishing school in Switzerland.

=== 2012–2019 ===
In November 2012, a fourteen-year-old Holly returns during Cindy and Tony's, Doug Carter (PJ Brennan) and Ste Hay's (Kieron Richardson) double wedding. During the reception a mini bus crashes through the wedding venue and the accident kills several residents, but Holly, Cindy and Tony are all left uninjured and Holly returns to Switzerland. Holly returns to the village after learning about Cindy's attack which took place on Christmas Day and visits her in hospital. It is clear that she is far from interested about her mother's recovery and is asked by Tony and Myra to stay at the McQueens, much to her disapproval. When Cindy's condition improves, Tony refuses to carry on paying Holly's finishing school fees after he splits up with Cindy, and much to Holly's fury and frustration, she is forced to attend the local Hollyoaks High School and live in Tony's flat with Cindy and Tony, in the midst of their fractured marriage.

During the ongoing domestic turmoil between Cindy and Tony, Holly feels neglected and isolated and goes clubbing at Chez Chez with Theresa McQueen and Sinead O'Connor (Stephanie Davis). After consuming a lot of alcohol, she is rejected by Chez Chez barman Kevin Foster (Elliot Balchin), and Sinead takes her back home to the O'Connors' flat. Although Holly is vomiting excessively, her and Sinead convince Sinead's step-mother Diane O'Connor (Alex Fletcher) not to bring her back to Cindy, else she might be punished, so she stays the night there. The next morning Diane takes a hungover Holly back home. After Cindy has a heated encounter with Diane, Holly later has a bad argument with her mother, and accuses her of being a bad parent. Cindy and Holly later make up and agree to move out of Tony's.

Cindy and Holly move into the flat above the Price Slice convenience store. Cindy is also offered a job at Price Slice, resulting in Frankie Osborne (Helen Pearson) getting sacked. This utterly displeases Frankie since the Osbornes are in a state of economic unrest. Furthermore, when Nancy Osborne (Jessica Fox) discovers two and a half thousand pounds cash in an envelope, she becomes suspicious that her husband Darren is gambling. As she is confronting him at the Dog, Holly intervenes and tells Nancy the cash belongs to Cindy and her, so she gives it to Holly. Darren initially believes that Holly was merely helping him hide that he was gambling, which Holly was aware of. However, when he later asks Holly to return his money, she refuses, threatening to inform Nancy of his gambling if he tries to get it back.

After arguing with Sinead, Holly reports her to social services for drug-dealing, as Sinead has a baby daughter. This causes serious problems for Sinead. Holly later begins a relationship with Callum Kane (Laurie Duncan). Callum and Holly go on a trip to country mansion with Esther Bloom (Jazmine Franks), Esther's girlfriend Tilly Evans (Lucy Dixon) and Tilly's new housemate Jade Hedy (Lucy Gape), to celebrate Esther's eighteenth birthday. While Callum and Holly are messing around with a shotgun outside, Holly nearly shoots a man. Callum and Holly take the man in and apologize, finding out his name is Wes and that he coincidentally already knows Jade. Wes forgives them, but when Wes and Holly are alone, Wes acts violent towards her. Holly tells Callum about this although Callum refuses to believe it, causing them to argue. During a house party on the trip, Wes joins Holly alone in the bedroom and forces her to let him take topless pictures of her or he will report her to the police for nearly shooting him. He is then interrupted by Theresa, who is also at the party, and Wes then leaves. The next day, Wes threatens to shoot Holly with the shotgun. Callum walks in on Wes doing this, and they fight after Wes reveals the topless pictures he has of Holly. The fight causes a head injury for Wes, but Callum and Holly think that he is dead and leave the room. Wes is actually alive however, although Jade then stabs him dead. A crazed and halloucegenic Jade then ties Esther up and reveals that Esther's liver transplant came from her dead boyfriend. Jade, who feels as though Esther is abusing her gift of a new liver by drinking alcohol at the party, and feels that Esther doesn't deserve it, plans to kill her. Callum tries to save Esther, but Jade stabs and kills Callum with a samurai sword before he can, in order to stop him. Jade then ties Holly up, although Tilly eventually kills Jade during a fight and releases both Holly and Esther.

Holly (now Amanda Clapham), still trying to cope with Callum's death, gets drunk with Robbie Roscoe (Charlie Wernham), then later kisses his brother Jason Roscoe (Alfie Browne-Sykes) and they start dating. After a rocky start they decide to have sex, but it does not turn out well and they try again. Headteacher Patrick Blake (Jeremy Sheffield) confiscates Holly's phone that Jason's holding when Jason makes a comment about his family. To impress Holly, Jason breaks into Patrick's home and steals Holly's phone back. He messes up Patrick's flat further to make it look like a general robbery. Patrick's fiancé Maxine suddenly enters the flat and Jason, panicked, runs straight past her out the open door. Jason returns the phone to Holly thinking she'll be impressed but she is annoyed at how he did it. When Patrick sees Holly holding her distinctive pink-cased mobile, he assumes that she was the one who broke into his flat and calls both her and Jason into his office, where Jason admits it was him. Patrick gets the police involved and Jason thinks that he won't be in too much trouble as he only took Holly's phone. However, unbeknownst to him, Maxine falsely claimed to hospital staff that the person who broke into her flat assaulted her as he ran past her out the door and caused her bruises, to cover up the fact that it was really her abusive fiancé Patrick who assaulted her and caused them. Jason is charged with assault.

A released Jason then surprises Holly with a romantic picnic in the empty Deli, but halfway through they smell smoke and are alarmed to see that the Deli is on fire; they are trapped in as the fire is blocking their only exit. Tony and Ste hear their screams and call the fire brigade. Firefighter Leela Lomax (Kirsty-Leigh Porter) rescues them from the fire unharmed.

Holly is blamed by Cindy for leaving the Price Slice freezer door open and letting the stock defrost. Cindy shouts at Holly, but Holly claims that it wasn't her. It is later revealed that unbeknownst to anyone, Cindy has started sleepwalking and opening the freezer as she does, as she is having trouble coping since she and her friends Mercedes and Lindsey Butterfield (Sophie Austin) murdered Mercedes husband, Lindsey's colleague and the father of Cindy's unborn child, Dr. Paul Browning (Joseph Thompson) - the freezer was where the trio originally stored his body before they disposed of it. Cindy gives birth three months early to Holly's half-brother Hilton Max Cunningham. He is born with Severe Combined Immunodeficiency which means he needs a Bone Marrow Transplant. Holly, along with Cindy, immediately offer to be donors but neither of them are matches.

Holly and Jason experience problems in their relationship which is made worse by Holly sleeping with Dodger. Holly lies about the incident when Cindy questions her saying Dodger raped her but she later comes clean causing Jason to break up with her. Holly also struggles to deal with Cindy's bipolar as she starts to think that dead boyfriend Rhys is still alive and wants them to run away together. Cindy eventually disappears causing Holly to panic over what to do but Cindy's boyfriend Dirk Savage (David Kennedy promises to support her and Hilton. Cindy is later found and sectioned but she tells Jason that she believes that Holly and Dirk are trying to poison her which he then tells Holly, upsetting her. When Cindy comes for a visit she tries to run away eventually falling into a lake. When Holly tries to get her out Cindy pushes her under. She survives but Cindy is once again sectioned.

In November she discovers that Jason has an eating disorder and is shocked he never told her he was struggling. At Christmas Cindy is released and starts to mend her relationship with Holly, buying her a car for Christmas and her birthday. She is delighted when Dirk proposes to her mum. In 2015, Holly is delighted to find that her former stepbrother Harry Thompson (Parry Glasspool) is in Hollyoaks High and befriends him and newcomers Cleo McQueen (Nadine Rose Mulkerrin) and Zack Loveday (Duayne Boachie). Holly supports Jason when he is admitted to an eating disorder facility.

In June 2015 she is stunned when Jason proposes to her and initially rejects him. She later changes her mind but they agree to wait a while before getting married. Holly is horrified when Cindy's bipolar returns and causes her to kiss Jason and that he did nothing about it. She later sleeps with Robbie after he pushes Jason off a ravine and left him for dead. She later visits Jason in hospital but refuses to forgive him. Robbie later gets her a job babysitting Curtis but she is kidnapped by Trevor and Ashley after their plan to kidnap Patrick was rumbled and they thought she was the snitch, Jason however comes to her rescue and they get back together after Jason tells her how he feels about her, just as Robbie was going to tell her he's in love with her. Holly and Robbie continue their affair and although Holly feels regret for betraying Jason, she doesn't end it. Holly is devastated when Cindy has to go back to a secure unit, nobody aware that Cindy's friend Lindsey (the Gloved Hand Killer) drugged her and faked the results so nobody would believe her claims of a serial killer. Holly then talks to newcomer Alfie Nightingale (Richard Linnell) about it, neither aware that they're half-siblings. Jason then proposes to Holly at a Christmas party, but Nico Blake (Persephone Swales-Dawson), who has a crush on Jason, believes it's for her and accepts. Humiliated, Nico starts a revenge campaign against Holly and overhears her talking to Robbie about their affair.

Holly then discovers that Mac and Cindy were married in secret and had a child who turns out to Alfie, Holly's half-brother. After she finds out, she refuses to forgive Cindy and then disowns her, but she was later discover that it was her grandfather who arranged the marriage with Mac. During Jason and Holly's wedding, Nico sends a video of Robbie confessing his love for Holly. After realising it was Robbie she cheated on him with, he runs away crying. Robbie and Holly then start an official relationship, much to the anger of Jason, who lashes out on both of them every chance he gets. Jason later forces himself on Holly after he starts taking steroids again. Freddie Roscoe (Charlie Clapham) sees the kiss. Believing she's cheating on him with Jason, he informs Robbie. Holly tells Robbie that Jason forced himself on her, which causes Robbie to furiously attack Jason. Jason then retaliates by saying that he is no longer his brother and that he hates him a lot. Jason later collapses on the city wall after talking with Holly. Holly realises that he has been taking steroids again and becomes angry with him. However, Freddie blames Holly and Robbie's relationship for Jason's steroid usage and forces her to end it. Holly tells Robbie that she lied about Jason forcing himself on her and that they actually had sex together. Robbie becomes furious with her and ends their relationship for good. Jason and Robbie leave for South Africa to get away from Hollyoaks, but mainly Holly. While Robbie is using the toilet at the airport, Jason phones Holly that she should come to the airport if she really loves Robbie. After drinking a glass of champagne, Holly and Cleo make their way to the airport.

As Holly heads to the airport, Robbie finds out Jason really did force himself on her and becomes angry with him, until when he found out it was the steroids messing with his head. When Robbie sees that Holly isn't at the airport, he believes that she doesn't love him anymore. However she arrives seconds later, but she realises how happy Jason and Robbie are without her, and leaves in tears, regretting ever going to the airport. As Holly and Cleo leave the airport, Holly speeds up to get away and while she isn't looking at the road, her car collides with the car that has Nathan Nightingale (Jared Garfield) and Rachel Hardy (Jennifer Brooke) inside. The crash knocks Cleo unconscious and leaves Rachel's legs trapped underneath the dashboard. Holly, with Nathan's help, get a trapped and unconscious Cleo out of the car before it is crushed. Nathan then tries to free Rachel from the car, but he can't, so he goes inside and talks with her for a little bit. When a fire starts in front of their car, Rachel tries to get herself out and Nathan gets help from a firefighter. But when Nathan arrives back at the car, the car explodes, killing Rachel instantly. At the hospital, Holly talks about how much trouble she is going to be in. Cleo then takes the blame for the crash as she believes no one was killed. However, when they are informed of Rachel's death by Mac Nightingale (David Easter), Holly tries to encourage Cleo to not take the blame, but Cleo refuses as she believes Holly has a good future ahead of her while she has no future at all. After being discharged from hospital, Holly and Cleo are then questioned by police. They tell them that a bird flew across the windscreen, which caused the car to crash. The police releases Cleo on bail pending further enquiries. He says that if it was dangerous driving, Cleo is more than likely to receive a lengthy prison sentence.

After receiving months of abuse from the Nightingale family, Cleo reveals that it was Holly that caused Rachel's death by dangerous driving during Pete's child sex abuse trial. All charges against Cleo are dropped and Holly is arrested on suspicion of causing death by dangerous driving. However, she is released without charge after Nathan forgives her. When Dirk's nephew, Nick Savage (Ben-Ryan Davies), arrives in the village the pair begin a secret relationship which then becomes public after they are caught by Cindy and Dirk. Months later, after Holly finds a video of a woman dancing provocatively on Nick's phone, the pair have sex. However, Holly is unaware that Nick has secretly filmed this video. Holly was shocked that Nick was arrested for raping Ellie Nightingale (Sophie Porley), at first she didn't believed her, but she later sees Nick's true colours when she is raped by Nick. Holly confronts Ellie and tells Ellie what Nick did to her and she decides to report Nick to the police with Ellie's help and she decided to support her. The next day, Nick admits to the police that he raped Holly and Ellie. Nick is later sentenced to 7 years in prison.

In July 2017, Holly goes to Ibiza, along with Ellie, Alfie, Tom and their friends. Upon their return home, newcomer Damon Kinsella (Jacob Roberts) offers to teach Holly and Ellie self-defense. Damon touches Holly and she hits him in the face, clearly not over her rape ordeal. She is angry when Ellie tells Damon everything about Nick. Holly later apologises to them. Holly is concerned for Ellie on the anniversary of her ordeal with Nick. She plans a spa day but Damon plans a night out and Holly warns Damon off Ellie.

In November 2017, Holly is horrified when she finds her sex tape on Dirk's laptop, unaware that the Cunninghams' lodger Milo Entwistle (Nathan Morris) planted it there. A disgusted Holly warns Cindy but Cindy refuses to believe her and marries Dirk. Holly packs her bags and leaves the village. Holly returns from Mexico but can't bring herself to forgive Dirk. At the Christmas Grotto, she finds herself working alongside Damon on a stall. They kiss but Holly freaks out. Dirk dresses up as Santa to spy on Holly and angrily confronts Damon before pushing him into a Christmas tree.

In June 2018, Holly and Damon get engaged after Damon mistakenly thinks she's proposing to him. Her friend Zack who has feelings for her, finds out that Damon slept with someone else. He forces Damon to tell Holly. Damon confesses to Holly that he slept with someone else but doesn't say that it was Cindy. A furious Holly calls of the engagement. When Zack is trying to ask her out Damon romantically asks Holly to forgive him and she does, leaving Zack devastated. Holly and Damon are furious when they discover that Milo hacked Damon's phone. Holly is horrified when she finds out that Milo has been tracking her, but unknownst to her, Milo has been secretly tracking the whole family. Dirk kicks Milo out and Holly decides she wants to marry Damon. Zack organises Holly's hen party at the loft and tells her it was Damon. Holly later thanks Zack, telling him she knows he set it up. Zack later confesses his feelings for Holly and she runs out of the Loft. The next day, she confronts Zack and he tries to convince her that Damon isn't the man for her and that he is. Liberty Savage (Jessamy Stoddart) accidentally lets it slip to Damon that Zack is in love with Holly. Damon confronts the pair and punches Zack, causing them to fight. Damon later apologises to Holly and she forgives him, much to Zack's dismay. Holly arrives in Llandudno for the wedding and Cindy tries to change her mind about marrying Damon. Damon stops the wedding and confesses to sleeping with Cindy, leaving Holly shocked. She is further shocked when she finds out that everyone knew about it. Cindy tries to apologise to Holly but she tells Cindy that she was never her priority and that Cindy always put herself before her. Holly and Zack arrive back in Chester and Zack makes her see that Damon was never the one for her. Holly stays at Zack's place and they kiss, unaware that Dirk has just died. They start a relationship but Damon breaks the news that Dirk has died and Holly forgives Cindy.

A few weeks later, Holly discover that Alife has a mental illness and supports him, although she decides to leave Hollyoaks to go traveling around the world with Ellie. Unable to tell Cindy, Holly tries to be a nuisance so Cindy will want her to go. Zack plans on proposing to Holly but backs out upon realising how much she wants to go. After Ellie is arrested, Cindy tells Holly that she will go instead, much to Holly's dismay. However, Cindy decides to stay to take care of Alfie and Holly says an emotional goodbye to Cindy and Tom. Ellie arrives just in time and the two girls drive out of Hollyoaks together. Months later, Holly is seen making a phone call to Zack at the top of the Eiffel Tower in Paris, telling him that she loves him. Zack later boards a flight the same day to Paris to join her.

== Reception ==
In 2018, Claire Crick from Digital Spy put the recasting of Holly to Wallis Day on her list of eight soap opera recasts that did not "work out", writing that fans felt "uneasy" due to Day being "clearly too old for the role". However, Crick noted that Clapham, Day's successor, "made a huge success of the role".

== See also ==
- List of soap opera villains
