= Holly Hutchinson =

Holly Hutchinson may refer to:

- Holly Cunningham, also Hutchinson, a fictional character from the British soap opera Hollyoaks
- Holly Hutchinson (tennis), British tennis player
