= Cindy Cunningham =

Fictional character from Hollyoaks

- Hollyoaks character
- Stephanie Waring as Cindy Cunningham (2019)
- Portrayed by: Laura Crossley (1995–1996); Stephanie Waring (1996–present)
- Duration: 1995–2000; 2004; 2008–2024; 2026–present
- First appearance: 13 November 1995
- Introduced by: Phil Redmond (1995); Jo Hallows (2004); Bryan Kirkwood (2008); Hannah Cheers (2026)
- Spin-off appearances: Hollyoaks Later (2009, 2020)
- Crossover appearances: Emmerdale (2021); EastEnders (2021)
In-universe information
- Other names: Cindy Hutchinson; Cindy Longford; Cindy Nightingale; Cindy Savage
- Occupation: Businesswoman; Barmaid; Exotic dancer; Waitress; Shop manager; Pub landlady
- Family: Cunningham
- Father: Gordon Cunningham
- Mother: Angela Cunningham
- Stepfather: Terry Williams
- Stepmother: Helen Richardson
- Brothers: Max Cunningham
- Sisters: Dawn Cunningham; Jude Cunningham
- Half-brothers: Tom Cunningham
- Husband: Tony Hutchinson (2009–2010, 2012–2013); Alistair Longford (2010–2011); Mac Nightingale (2014–2016); Dirk Savage (2015, 2017–2018); Dave Chen-Williams (2024)
- Sons: Alfie Nightingale; Maddox Keane; Hilton Cunningham
- Daughters: Holly Cunningham
- Stepsons: Harry Thompson; Nathan Nightingale; James Nightingale; Will Savage; Sam Chen-Williams; Mason Chen-Williams
- Stepdaughters: Liberty Savage; Ellie Nightingale Maxine Minniver; Serena Chen-Williams (adoptive); Lizzie Chen-Williams (adoptive)
- Nieces: Bethany Cunningham; Steph Cunningham-Lomax

Cindy Cunningham (also Savage, Longford and Hutchinson) is a fictional character from the British soap opera Hollyoaks, played by Stephanie Waring. She made her first on-screen appearance on 13 November 1995, originally played by Laura Crossley, as the youngest daughter of Gordon (Bernard Latham) and Angela Cunningham (Liz Stooke). A year after her first appearance, Crossley quit the serial later that year and the role was recast to Waring who appeared from November 1996 to November 2000. Waring reprised the role briefly in February 2004 before returning as a full-time character in June 2008, reintroduced by series producer Bryan Kirkwood. In 2010, the character was temporarily written out for Waring's maternity leave. She returned to filming in January 2011 and returned to screens on 9 March 2011. In April 2024, it was announced Waring had been axed from the soap as part of a revamp, however was assured Cindy would not be killed-off. Cindy departed the Village with Tom Cunningham, after she discovered her husband Dave Williams' crimes on 4 September 2024. She returned to the Village in July 2026.

Waring has been nominated for several awards for her part as Cindy. Cindy is considered to be one of the show’s most iconic characters and has had many major storylines including teenage pregnancy; coping with the deaths of several family members; marriages to Tony Hutchinson (Nick Pickard), Alistair Longford (Terence Harvey), Mac Nightingale (David Easter), Dirk Savage (David Kennedy) and Dave Chen-Williams (Dominic Power); being diagnosed with bipolar disorder; and revealing that she had a secret teenage son, Alfie Nightingale (Richard Linnell), with Mac. Cindy is the longest-serving female in the show, taking over from Frankie Osborne (Helen Pearson) following her departure in 2017.

== Creation and casting ==
Cindy as she appeared in early 2000s episodes

The character of Cindy was created in the early days of the show, and is one of the original members of the Cunningham family. Auditions were held for the part of Cindy, with actress Laura Crossley landing the role of Cindy in 1995. Crossley then quit the show in 1996 and the decision was made to recast the part as soon as possible, making her last appearance as Cindy on 4 November 1996. The role of Cindy was handed over to Stephanie Waring when they started giving the character more central storylines as Cindy was getting older and Waring made her first appearance as Cindy on 14 November 1996, ten days after her last appearance being portrayed by Crossley in her last appearance. Waring was only contracted for four episodes until her contract was extended to a permanent basis. Waring then left the show in 2000. In 2002, Waring admitted she would like to return to the series and later reprised the role in with 2004 for a brief stint. In 2008, Bryan Kirkwood had asked Stephanie to reprise her role along with Sarah Jayne Dunn for the exit of their on-screen brother Max Cunningham on an initial six-month contract. This was because at the time the series had lost many of its long term characters and he felt it was time to bring some characters from the past back. She remained with the series until 2010, when Waring took maternity leave, before returning on 9 March 2011.

== Development ==
=== Characterisation ===
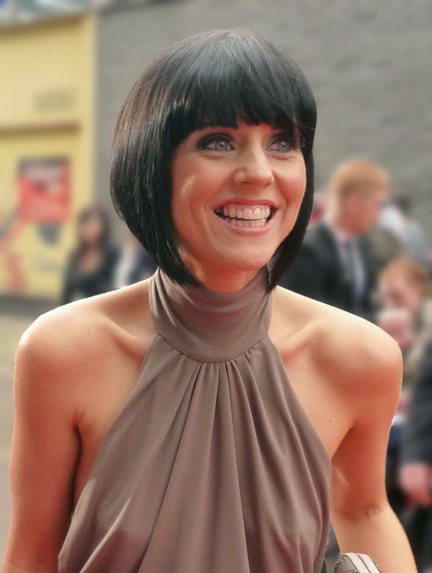
Stephanie Waring has called Cindy a "manipulative bitch", but has also said she has a "vulnerable side"

The Channel 4 publicity website for Hollyoaks have described the character as having a manipulative personality that's not even cured by the death of her brother, and also that she constantly enjoys stirring up other people's lives.

In an interview with PA, Stephanie Waring, who plays the character, said she wanted to see Cindy tackle more emotional storylines. She stated, "It's really fun to play the comedy and the manipulative bitch, but for me personally I feel more at home doing the drama — so it was really nice to get scripts again that show that. As much as I love doing the comedy, this is where I feel at home, so I'm hoping there is more to come."

Waring also admitted that growing older has helped her cope better with Hollyoaks. "There is a different vibe since I was here last time", she continued, "I'm a lot older as well so my life is completely different so I'm handling it a lot better than I probably did when I was 18. When you're 18 and start a new show you don't know anything about life. It will be difficult for anybody. But now after being away, doing other things and growing up you approach it from a different angle. It's work at the end of the day and you go home and you've got your family. And that's what it's about. Doing what you love."

In 2010, a new plot saw Cindy's daughter Holly run away. During an interview with Digital Spy, Waring, when asked whether she felt the storyline would change Cindy permanently, she replied: "Definitely. I hope so. I hope not to the extent that they stop making her fun. She says what she thinks but she's got a vulnerable side as well. She doesn't want to be seen as joker all the time. I hope they keep that but that she becomes a better mother because of it. I just hope we don't lose the essence of Cindy." Waring claimed that the plot made her emotional, she told PA: "I'm a mother myself so I have to put myself in that position and think how I'd feel how if it happened to me. Going there even a little bit made me break down completely. I can't even think about it. Even when I'm watching stuff on TV involving kids being hurt I get a lump in my throat and have to give her a cuddle when she's asleep!" Despite promising Cindy would change, in an interview with Radio Times, Waring stated that viewers have not seen the last of her unpleasant side, which she dubbed "uber-Cindy". She commented: "I'm excited about [it]. It's so much more exciting to play a character with character. I see [her] as a 'fun bitch' rather than a nasty one like [Coronation Street's] Tracy or [Hollyoaks] Clare Devine. Cindy has a swagger and delusions of grandeur and I think people love to hate that."

Writers have used Cindy to depict mental health issues. Waring was happy that Cindy is seen on-screen with mental health problems because it helped raise awareness amongst viewers. In conjunction with the storyline, Waring decided to support a Sunday Mirror backed campaign to raise awareness of mental health issues.

=== Reintroduction (2004, 2008) ===
In 2004, Stephanie Waring reprised the role once again. She returned alongside Liz Stooke who plays her mother, Angela Cunningham for the funeral of her father, Gordon. Waring continued to appear as Cindy to explore the aftermath of Gordon's death. Cindy is featured at odds with her siblings over the inheritance money due from their parent's will. In addition, Cindy is unhappy with how Mandy is looking after their youngest brother, Tom Cunningham (Ellis Hollins). Dunn told Alison James from Soaplife that Cindy is critical of Mandy and accuses her of being negligent around Tom. Dunn added that "Cindy hits a nerve. Mandy lashes out saying she supported Cindy when she was in trouble and Cindy should now do the same for her." When Mandy is given sole responsibility for Gordon and Helen's will, Cindy is upset. Dunn explained that Cindy just wants her inheritance and to resume her life away from Hollyoaks. Mandy being in charge of the will halts that plan. Dunn concluded that the will storyline put Cindy, Mandy and Max "at loggerheads" with each other and caused family disputes.

In 2008, it was announced Hollyoaks producer Bryan Kirkwood had decided to bring back Waring to reprise her role as Cindy for the wedding, and funeral, of her on-screen brother Max. Speaking to Digital Spy in 2009 of her return, Waring stated: "It's flattering to think the return's been successful because I was a bit worried. At first I thought, 'How are we going to make this work?' but Bryan [Kirkwood] was very clear with what he wanted. He was going to bring Cindy back as this larger than life character. We don't actually know what went on in Spain and what changed her over these last few years and we find out a little bit why in Hollyoaks Later which kind of brings it round full circle."

She continued about her future with the soap: "I don't have any plans to leave — I'm very, very happy. I say bring it on to whatever the producers want to give me. I do have a couple of projects that I'm working on myself. I have something that I'm currently writing — I wrote something a few years ago and I'm currently working on that. I like having something of my own as well as Hollyoaks." During 2009, Waring signed an 18-month contract to stay on the soap. She told PA: "I am contracted until next April so a long time yet. I'd love to stay as long as they want me. I got an 18-month contract, which they offered me last September. I was really surprised. They are usually six months or a year."

Cindy's 'gold-digging' personality became clearer after her return. Cindy and Darren Osborne decided to scam Tony Hutchinson out of his money. However, the character changed her plans and decided not to marry Tony for his money. Talking about the conclusion of the storyline, Waring stated: "I think she's definitely out for what she can get — she's always going to be up to something! We're going to have to see what happens with this but I don't think she'll change who she's become over the last eight years in Spain. It's important that we see she's not this one-dimensional gold-digging tart, though. There were some episodes in normal Hollyoaks where we saw this a little bit when she thought Tony was just with her for her looks and Holly didn't want to be like her. In Later this spills out again and we get to see more of the Cindy there once was before moving to Spain." In another interview, she said: "She uses her outer image to hide who she really is inside and in Later we discover she's just a normal girl who wants to find love and security and have a secure life with her daughter and have a family — she's found that in Tony." After their postponed wedding, Cindy admitted her plans to Tony and the pair split up, however they agreed to get married, which they did in Hollyoaks Later.

=== Maternity Leave (2010) ===
In 2010, Waring became pregnant and her character was temporarily written out for Waring's maternity leave. Waring confirmed on her Twitter page at the beginning of December that she had received scripts for her return to the show. She returned to filming in January 2011 and returned on 9 March 2011.

== Storylines ==
=== 1995–2004 ===
On her sixteenth birthday, Cindy has sex with Lee Stanley (Nathan Valente) and becomes pregnant. Cindy conceals the pregnancy and she rejects Stan's offer to stand by her during the pregnancy. Stan and Ollie Benson (Paul Leyshon) are later killed in a car accident. Cindy secretly gives birth on Christmas Day 1997 and abandons her daughter at a nearby hospital. Her father, Gordon (Bernard Latham) forces Cindy to take responsibility and look after the baby, who she names Holly Cunningham (Katie Hynes). She is devastated to find out that her sister, Dawn (Lisa Williamson) has died of leukaemia. Cindy becomes depressed and attempts to suffocate Holly; however, her sister Jude Cunningham (Davinia Taylor) stops her and makes her realise that she loves her daughter. Cindy begins a romance with Sean Tate (Daniel Pape) but he begins to mistreat Holly. Max Cunningham (Matt Littler) catches Sean locking Holly in a fridge and social services get involved when Holly is burnt by a firework. Cindy sees no other option but to leave the country with Holly and Sean to evade the social services. Holly does not have a passport and Sean dumps Cindy and leaves alone. Cindy returns and adapts to single parenting.

Cindy begins a new business venture, "Steam Team" and begins a relationship with Ben Davies (Marcus Patric). Cindy cheats on Ben with Sam "O.B." O'Brien (Darren Jeffries) but they remain together. At work, Cindy leaves Holly asleep in the cloak room of The Loft, where she swallows an ecstasy tablet. Holly is rushed to hospital and Cindy realises the social services will become involved again. Cindy decides to flee the country to avoid Holly being taken into care. Cindy and Ben escape in a car but run over Anna Green (Lisa Kay) and flee the scene. Ben remains behind and Cindy and Holly escape to Spain.

Cindy returns in February 2004, for her father Gordon's funeral and she reveals she owns a bar in Spain. In financial ruin, Cindy tries to scam Max and O.B. out of their money. She is successful but when she is found out she reluctantly gives them their money back, which helps them save their business. Cindy then vows never to return and departs for Spain again.

=== 2008–2024 ===
Cindy and Holly return in June 2008 after escaping from Phillip with his money. Cindy moves in with Max and doubts his fiancée Steph, believing she is only interested in his money. After Max is killed, a devastated Cindy uses his death to get sympathy and decides to stay. After being rejected by Warren Fox (Jamie Lomas), Cindy starts a fling with Darren Osborne (Ashley Taylor Dawson), which ends when he is imprisoned. Cindy enjoys a string of sex sessions with Rhys Ashworth (Andrew Moss) until Darren's release. Cindy discovers an affair between Warren and Mandy Richardson (Sarah Jayne Dunn). Cindy becomes enemies with Warren's fiancée Louise Summers (Roxanne McKee) after trying to seduce Warren.

After starting work at Il Gnosh restaurant, Cindy and Tony Hutchinson (Nick Pickard) start dating, despite Darren's jealousy. Darren tells Cindy he still loves her. Although she is seeing Tony, Cindy reciprocates and they plot to scam Tony by Cindy marrying him while Darren deflates The Dog in the Pond's business so they can buy it cheap. Despite his suspicions of Cindy, Tony marries her and they settle into married life and Tony's money. At Christmas, Cindy assumes Tony has bought her an expensive gift, but is disappointed to discover he has gained Holly a place in private school. After Tony buys Tan & Tumble, Cindy instates her position as the manager and reinvents it into a clothing shop, Cincerity. Despite Tony's negative views, Cindy is determined to prove him wrong. Holly runs away from home after feeling neglected and seeing Tony kiss Theresa McQueen (Jorgie Porter). Cindy believes her disappearance is just for attention. However, after police find Holly's school bag battered and left in a dustbin, Cindy begins to fear the worst and assumes Holly has been abducted. A nationwide search goes underway. Holly, who had been hiding at Spencer Gray's (Darren John Langford) flat, is found by Jake Dean (Kevin Sacre). Holly is knocked unconscious and Cindy accuses Jake of kidnapping her. As Holly lies in a coma, Cindy feels Tony is not supportive and seeks solace from ex-boyfriend Darren, believing her marriage has terminated. When Holly wakes up, Tony has a heart-to-heart with her, which Cindy overhears. She gives him a second chance. To get their marriage back on track, Cindy suggests they move to North Wales. Tony disagrees, but begins to view properties in the area. While there, he helps Gabby Sharpe (Phina Oruche), who is run over. After a week caring for Gabby, Tony realises that he feels no love for Cindy, so returns and tells her he wants a divorce.

Cindy meets Alistair Longford (Terence Harvey), a rich pensioner who assumes Cindy saved him from choking to death, when it was actually Myra McQueen (Nicole Barber-Lane). Cindy accompanies Alistair on several dates, and after a couple of days with each other's knowledge, he proposes. Cindy is initially hesitant, but accepts upon discovering he is a multi-millionaire. However, Jacqui McQueen (Claire Cooper) blackmails Cindy, threatening to tell Alistair that it was Myra who saved his life. Jacqui and Myra plan Cindy's wedding. Steph is horrified to discover Cindy is marrying Alistair, who is in his seventies. Alistair's mother Blanche Longford (Georgina Hale) arrives in Hollyoaks after being called by his granddaughters India (Beth Kingston) and Texas (Bianca Hendrickse-Spendlove) in an attempt to sabotage the wedding. Blanche's plans fail, but she refuses to believe Cindy truly loves Alistair. Cindy is eventually made to tell Alistair that Myra had actually saved his life. However, this does not hinder Alistair's decision to marry her. On the day of the wedding, Darren tries to talk Cindy out of it and asks her to marry him, which she rejects. Blanche witnesses Darren and Cindy together and during the wedding, tells Alistair that they are having an affair. Darren and Cindy deny an affair and the wedding goes ahead. Before she leaves for her honeymoon, Cindy apologises to Steph and says goodbye, knowing it may be the last time she sees her as Steph is terminally ill with cancer. Cindy assures Holly she has only married Alistair to secure her a good life. Alistair and Cindy leave, although she seems displeased when he reveals he has bought viagra.

In March 2011, Tony is shocked to discover that Cindy is the buyer of The Look Sharpe Spa, having become a millionairess, following the death of Alistair and decides to make changes by introducing a new uniform and changing the name of the Spa. She later goes to visit Darren and is shocked to discover he is the father of twins but she later employs him as her chauffeur. However, Nancy Hayton (Jessica Fox) tells him not to do the job but he tells her that he earns financial gain and doesn't listen to her, but Cindy is later annoyed as she realises Nancy will be in the car with them. She later befriends Noah Baxter (Law Thompson), who is her colleague at the Spa. She and Cheryl Brady (Bronagh Waugh) decided to have a party for gays in which she employs Tony to be a waiter for the evening. He agrees to carry on with the job because of the money he is being paid, although he is purposefully made to feel uncomfortable when he is repeatedly slapped on the bum.

When Mandy returned to Hollyoaks as manager of Cinergy, Mandy and Texas planned to scam Cindy out of her money by getting her to buy fake expensive paintings. They also got Cindy to buy a snake, which is later revealed as poisonous and when the snake escapes the girls panic. Cindy finds out that Mandy and Texas were continuing to con her out of her money and at first she is furious with Mandy and threatens to call the police, but later makes up with her. A priest named Father Francis (Richard Winsor) arrives in Hollyoaks and catches the affections of Cindy and Carmel Valentine (Gemma Merna) who also works in Cinergy. Cindy donates a large sum of money to Father Francis's charity, but it is later revealed that Father Francis is a con artist posing as a priest in order to steal Cindy's money.

In January 2012, Carmel finds out that Cindy has been ignoring "final demands" letters, when Cindy refuses to pay Carmel's wages, her mother Myra and sister Jacqui start to loot Cinergy and a fight breaks out between Cindy and Jacqui. The police are called and Cindy, Carmel, Jacqui, Myra, Cheryl, Nancy and Lynsey Nolan (Karen Hassan) are arrested. Cindy loses all of her money and businesses, and is left bankrupt. She is offered a job and a place to stay by her ex-husband Tony.

Cindy helps Darren plan a secret wedding to Nancy but unbeknownst to him, she is trying to win him back. When they dress shop together, Darren briefly cheats on Nancy by kissing Cindy and she is left feeling upset when he pushes her away. Eventually, Cindy accepts they won't have a future and ends up saving the day by confirming to Nancy, who is having doubts about his infidelity, that he is not having an affair. Cindy gets intoxicated at the reception and ends up having sex with Tony.

Afterwards, she rekindles her relationship with Tony. However, he begins to neglect her as he continues to spend excessive time with Barney Harper-McBride (Tom Scurr) and Rob Edwards (David Atkins). She shares a reignited attraction with her ex-lover Rhys, who has been facing isolation by his wife Jacqui McQueen (Claire Cooper), embroiled in the McQueen's situations. After a sensation of temptation grows, they share a passionate kiss, interrupted by Tony. They end up sleeping together and start an affair. Cindy starts regretting her secret affair with Rhys and considers ending their relationship. Even while attempting to do so, Cindy finds Rhys irresistible and she succumbs. Tony is concussed and becomes temporarily blind. Cindy finally splits up with Rhys, realising she has only ever been in love with Tony. Cindy and Rhys kiss in an alleyway, which she tells him is her way of bidding farewell. Tony, who has regained his sight, witnesses this although Cindy is unaware of this. Cindy and Tony still marry and Holly (Wallis Day) attends their wedding. Rhys plans to leave Hollyoaks village and Cindy asks him to take her with him. But they are interrupted when Maddie Morrison (Scarlett Bowman) crashes a stolen mini bus into the wedding venue. The van explodes and kills Neil Cooper (Tosin Cole) and Maddie. When the paramedics arrive, they tell Jacqui Rhys will die and that she should stay with him and comfort him. Cindy suffers a breakdown as Rhys dies and tells Jacqui he loves her and apologizes.

Jacqui learns of Rhys and Cindy's affair on Christmas Day 2012 and attacks Cindy, who is taken to hospital. Jacqui drags Cindy out of her hospital bed to Rhys's grave where she continues to attack her. Cindy turns to Tony for comfort, although Tony refuses to help her and instead takes Jacqui's side. Tony tells Cindy that if she reports Jacqui to the police then he will make her and Holly homeless. He files for divorce. Holly scams money off Darren, which she uses to buy a new flat for herself and Cindy. Cindy becomes attracted to Patrick Blake (Jeremy Sheffield) and feuds with Maxine Minniver (Nikki Sanderson), who is also attracted to Patrick. Patrick and Cindy briefly date, although he leaves Cindy for Maxine. A pregnant Sinead O'Connor (Stephanie Davis) works for Cindy and they initially fight, although Cindy starts to feel sympathy for her when she realizes that Sinead is similar to how Cindy was when she was pregnant with Holly. Sinead quits working for Cindy after she is a victim in a shooting in the shop. Sinead and Holly start fighting and Holly reports Sinead to social services after Sinead gives birth to a baby girl, Katy, and starts drug-dealing. Cindy lets Tony move in with her after she discovers he has cancer and after he accuses Sinead's stepmother, Diane O'Connor (Alex Fletcher) of reporting Sinead to the Social Services. Cindy feels bad when Tony and Sinead both turn on Diane, as she knows Holly really reported Sinead. Diane eventually finds out about Tony's cancer and they reunite.

Cindy has a steamy session with Dr. Paul Browning (Joseph Thompson) after he splits up with Mercedes McQueen (Jennifer Metcalfe), after she discovers his plan to kill her mother, Myra. Threatening to tell Mercedes about their night together when Doctor Browning turns on her, he bribes Cindy with money. Breaking under the pressure when Cindy refuses to take his money, he follows her to the school's open day and strangles her in the school's stationery cupboard. Nevertheless, he fails to kill her and as she wakes, she holds onto a dodgy shelf to help her up, which falls on her, knocking her unconscious. The following day, she is found by Dirk Savage (David Kennedy), who calls for an ambulance. Cindy soon recovers and while initially frightened, she plucks up the courage to tell junior doctor Lindsey Butterfield (Sophie Austin) that she wants to report her attacker to the police. However, Doctor Browning tells Cindy of his intention to murder Holly, to which she agrees to keep her mouth shut. Cindy eventually reveals to Lindsey that Doctor Browning was her attacker and Lindsey reveals that she was also attacked by him. Cindy and Lindsey try to convince Mercedes that Doctor Browning is dangerous after she reunites with him, but Mercedes refuses to believe it. After being caught on CCTV shooting Myra, Doctor Browning is arrested.

Cindy and Lindsey make up with Mercedes when she realizes that they were right about Doctor Browning, and they attend her 30th birthday party. During the party, however, Mercedes is taken back to her home by Doctor Browning where he begins to strangle her. Cindy and Lindsey arrive at her house in time to save her, and Cindy hits Doctor Browning round the head with a shovel. He passes out, but then wakes up and tries to attack Lindsey. Mercedes kills Dr. Browning with the shovel. Cindy initially feels guilty, as she reveals that she is pregnant with Doctor Browning's son, who she intends to keep. However, when it is clear to her that Doctor Browning was a sick man, the three girls hide Doctor Browning's body in Mercedes's attic, although when Mercedes discovers that Doctor Browning has life insurance worth £500,000, she agrees to split the money with Cindy. In order for them to receive the money, they needed his body to be found so, along with Lindsey and Freddie Roscoe (Charlie Clapham), who also discovered what happened, they made his death look as if he had driven his car off a cliff, telling Lindsey that they were doing it to get rid of him permanently. When Doctor Browning's body is found, Cindy discovers that she has the right to claim the full insurance money as she is pregnant with Browning's son and she decides to claim it all, cancelling the deal with Mercedes. Mercedes, infuriated, arranges for Trevor Royle (Greg Wood) to break into Cindy's apartment and threaten her and Holly so that Cindy gives Mercedes the money. When Browning's ex-wife refuses to take the money, Mercedes receives it. Dirk comforts Cindy following Trevor threatening her and they begin a relationship, despite Dirk not usually being the type of man Cindy would go for. They then become engaged. Later, Dirk discovers that Cindy played a part in Browning's murder and ends things with her. However, when Cindy goes into labour, Mercedes convinces Dirk to help Cindy after realising what a good friend Cindy is.

Cindy gives birth to baby Hilton, although he is unable to breathe and it is revealed he requires a blood transfusion, however the only person able to give the blood transfusion is Dr. Browning's son, Alex (Ojan Genc). Mercedes goes to meet Alex, pretending to be a cleaner and convinces him to help Cindy, however she lies to Alex that Hilton is already dead, not wanting him to know the truth about Dr. Browning's death. However, Alex eventually discovers the truth and helps Hilton. In June 2014, Cindy is diagnosed with bipolar disorder and starts thinking that Rhys is still alive and they are in a relationship. Holly realizes something is wrong with Cindy and tells local nurse Sandy Roscoe (Gillian Taylforth), however Cindy accuses Holly of being over dramatic because of puberty and Sandy believes her. Cindy worries that everyone will hate her for being with Rhys, and attempts to escape with Rhys and Hilton. However, when Cindy steals the pram for Tony and Diane's children, she is caught attempting to escape and is taken in to a psychiatric institution. Dirk and Holly come to visit Cindy and she is in a terrible state, and thinks that everyone is against her. She destroys the gifts they gave to her, and thinks people are trying to poison her. Holly later revisits Cindy and she accuses Holly of calling her a liar as Holly suspects that she has been hiding food, but it is later revealed that Jason is responsible. Cindy is later released from the unit, but still believes Holly is against her, and she tries to flee the village with Lindsey. Lindsey tells Cindy that she called Mercedes to meet them. But Cindy steals her phone and discovers that Lindsey had called Dirk. Cindy is horrified and drives to the lake. Holly attempts to help Cindy, but she falls into the lake and Holly dives in to help her, but Cindy tries to drown her and requests at the hospital to return to the unit. Holly and Dirk are upset, and want her to come home again to help with Hilton and stay with them. Holly sings at a Christmas concert at school and Jason sends a video to Cindy, and Cindy is pleased to see Holly on stage. At Christmas Eve, Cindy returns home again and is proposed to by Dirk. She happily accepts.

In 2015, Cindy spends more time with Dirk as Will is in hospital after Nico Blake (Persephone Swales-Dawson) pushed him off the hospital roof. She is unaware of the murders Will committed, and goes to visit him. She is also unaware that Will is awake, and Dirk is horrified to learn that Will is awake and what he would do to Cindy. Dirk rushes into the ward and Cindy gets up to leave. Will injects Cindy with morphine which nearly kills her. She is put in hospital but quickly recovers. Dirk chooses to attend Will's funeral, but Cindy is angry with Dirk because she wants him to be with her after he tried to kill her. Dirk goes to the funeral anyway, but Cindy and Dirk's brother, Dr. Charles S'avage (Andrew Greenough), come to the funeral to be with Dirk. Cindy has been demoted and is currently at war with the shops new manager Simone Loveday (Jacqueline Boatswain). However, she is later fired.

Cindy begins work at the Emporium, working under Dirk.Mac Nightingale (David Easter) arrives to tell Cindy that he needs a divorce, revealing that Cindy is a bigamist. This is kept a secret and doesn't resurface until October 2015, when Mac arrives in the village with his family, revealing he is the new owner of the Dog In The Pond. Cindy feels awkward when she meets Mac's fiancée, Neeta Kaur (Amrit Maghera). Mac gets on at Cindy to give him a divorce so she lies and gets Simone to print out fake documents. But in January 2016, on Mac and Neeta's wedding day, Cindy realises the mistake she has made and bursts into The Loft, where Mac and Neeta are just about to get married and she reveals that Mac is her husband, shocking Neeta, the Nightingales and Dirk, who has overheard it. Dirk refuses to talk to her but they later reconcile. Turmoil strikes again in February 2016, when Mac's ex-wife Marnie Nightingale (Lysette Anthony) reveals the shock that Mac's son Alfie (Richard Linnell) is Cindy's son too, leaving her horrified and to go on a downward spiral. In June 2016, at Alfie and his girlfriend Jade Albright's (Kassius Nelson) cancer skydive, she proposes romantically to Dirk and he accepts. But in August 2016, Marnie blackmails Cindy into revealing that she had an affair with Freddie to cover herself. In September 2016, Cindy reveals to Dirk she wants to move out of the flat due to the number of people living in it, herself, Dirk, Holly, little Hilton and newcomer and Dirk's nephew, Nick Savage (Ben-Ryan Davies). She also says she wants to move into one of the new flats that are being built, Royal Oaks. She begins work at Nightingales, as a pot washer but finds herself and Tony treated like slaves by Marnie. She is later delighted that the manager of the Royal Oaks building development, "Mrs Windsor-Davenport" is in fact her sister, Jude. She briefly clashes with Jude and stages a protest against the flats when Jude says she can't have a flat, but this is resolved, however she is unaware that the building development is all a scam. Cindy later discovers that it is all a scam and confronts Jude at the "Halloween Spooktaclar" set up by Jude. Cindy implores Jude to tell her friends the truth but the money is taken by Liam Donovan (Maxim Baldry). They dress up to try and seduce him but they are caught by Dirk. They finally get their money but after a fire at the event kills Nico and Joe Roscoe (Ayden Callaghan), Jude decides to flee with the money. She says goodbye to Cindy and gives her some of the money. Cindy is scared when Tom disappears along with the rest of the Osbornes and is determined to find him. Cindy is alarmed when Alfie reveals he can see Jade and she thinks he has her bipolar. Cindy is shocked when she finds Holly and Dirk's nephew in a compromising position and forbids them from seeing each other. Cindy and the rest of the family move into the Roscoes's house. Myra finds out Cindy's involvement in the scam and a fight ensues between Cindy, Myra, Sally St. Claire (Annie Wallace) and Goldie McQueen (Chelsee Healey) but is broken up by DS Gavin Armstrong (Andrew Hayden Smith).

Cindy runs to be local councilor along with Simone. The feud gets intense so Dirk and Louis Loveday (Karl Collins) arrange a peacemaking lunch. Cindy brings up Simone's past and squirts ketchup over her. At another election, Simone calls Cindy a bipolar mess and throws water over her. Cindy and Dirk decide to get a lodger and Ds Armstrong and Milo Entwistle (Nathan Morris) both want to move in. The next day, Cindy is delighted when Nick is sent to prison for raping Holly and Ellie Nightingale (Sophie Porley) Cindy allows Armstrong to move in after he helps Holly through the trial. Having previously stalked Leela Lomax (Kirsty Leigh Porter), Armstrong begins stalking Cindy. Cindy is upset when someone begins trolling her on the internet, unaware it is Armstrong. When Dirk has to go to America, Armstrong promises to take care of Cindy. Armstrong convinces Cindy to do a talk about powerful women in Liverpool. However Holly is against the idea, but he manages to persuade Cindy to do it and Cindy is unaware that there is no conference. Armstrong offers to escort Cindy to the conference and while there alone in the hotel room, Armstrong tries to kiss Cindy but she refrains. Cindy decides to forget about the kiss and when she is in the bathroom, she gets a call from Leela warning her about Armstrong. He notices Cindy acting strange and grabs her but Cindy knees him in the groin. He chases her through the corridors but she is greeted by Leela and Milo. Armstrong disappears but is later caught. Cindy struggles to cope in the aftermath of her ordeal with Armstrong. Dirk worries about Cindy's health when she is convinced that Armstrong is watching her. Cindy imagines Armstrong standing over and screams but Dirk sees nobody there. Cindy is annoyed when Yasmine Maalik (Haeisha Mistry) wants to write an article on her but Cindy doesn't allow it. Cindy starts getting strange phonecalls from someone who she suspects is Armstrong but turns out to be Yasmine. Cindy is scared when she hears an intruder and attacks them with a brush but the intruder is revealed to be Mandy. Mandy reveals that she has kidnapped her daughter from care and is arrested after Milo calls the police.

Dirk and Cindy decide to get married again but Holly is furious when she finds her sex tape on Dirk's laptop, unaware that Milo put it there. Holly confronts Dirk and she makes Cindy choose between them, but Cindy knows that he is innocent and chooses Dirk, so Holly leaves for Mexico. A few weeks after their wedding, Cindy and Dirk begin to argue and Dirk sleeps with Myra and Cindy throws him out. Armstrong escapes from prison with the help of Milo after he blackmails him over the fact that Milo killed Gordon and Helen 13 years previously. Armstrong leaves Christmas presents for Cindy and kidnaps Holly but is accidentally killed by Milo. Cindy sleeps with Glenn Donovan (Bob Cryer) and is horrified when she realises he is Grace Black's (Tamara Wall) boyfriend. Cindy helps Grace find who the mystery women is and lets Ellie take the blame. She confesses it was her when Grace threatens to throw Ellie down the Loft stairs. Grace blindfolds Cindy and pretends to have a gun and makes her dance while making her reveal embarrassing secrets. Cindy decides to start her own business along with Finn. She asks Tom for a loan from his inheritance but he turns her down. Cindy steals the money from him and bets it on a greyhound but loses it all. She lets Finn take the blame and he is arrested but Tom drops the charges. Dirk tells Tom that Cindy stole his money and Tom announces this to the crowd at the opening. After this Tom disowns her and moves back in with the Osbornes. An emotional Cindy sleeps with Holly's boyfriend Damon Kinsella (Jacob Roberts) after he and Holly have a row. Cindy is guilt ridden after sleeping with Damon and they agree to forget all about it.

Cindy grows close to Milo's brother Theo Jones (Matt Kennard) who knows the truth about Milo. Dirk discovers the truth and threatens Theo, so he leaves. Milo convinces Cindy to forgive Dirk and she does. Cindy is confused when Alfie starts acting strange and he locks everyone in the house. An ambulance is called so Alfie runs away. He stands on the village wall and threatens to jump, thinking gravity will save him. James Nightingale (Gregory Finnegan) arrives just in time and grabs him. Alfie is taken to hospital and Marnie blames Cindy for his mental illness. Cindy visits Alfie and they have a heart to heart and Alfie says she is the reason he is like this, leaving Cindy feeling guilty. Cindy is annoyed when Damon and Holly get engaged and drags Milo into helping her split them up. Damon discovers that Milo has been tracking Holly around the village and Dirk throws him out. Milo gives Cindy a keychain to remember him by. She confronts Damon about marrying Holly and Milo hears their conversation on a voice recorder on the key chain and discovers that they slept together. Later, Milo holds a doll version of Cindy and plans revenge on her.

Cindy and Dirk travel to Llandudno for Holly and Damon's wedding. Milo gives Cindy an ultimatum: either she breaks up with Dirk and leaves the village for good, or he'll tell Holly that she slept with Damon. Cindy decides to tell Holly the truth but after they talk, she realises she can't ruin Holly's wedding day so she decides to leave. She breaks up with Dirk, leaving him confused. Cindy decides to leave after the wedding, but during the ceremony, Damon confesses to sleeping with Cindy. Cindy tries to apologise to Holly but she refuses, stating that she feels like she never Cindy's priority as she always put herself first. Distraught, Cindy tells Dirk that Milo was blackmailing her and Dirk sets off to find him. Dirk and Milo argue and Milo pushes him into the pool. Milo turns on a faulty lightbox, causing Dirk to get electrocuted, killing him. Cindy, Tom and Liberty Savage (Jessamy Stoddart) arrive to find Dirk dead, devastating Cindy.

Cindy returns to the village trying to come to terms with what just happened. Simone berates her over sleeping with Damon and when the emporium door closes, Cindy thinks Dirk is back and rushes over, but finds Milo instead. Milo tells Simone what has happened and Simone comforts her before leaving the two alone. Cindy confronts Milo over making her leave and making her break up with Dirk. Milo tells her it was an accident and that she can stay. Holly forgives Cindy after hearing about Dirk's death and they hug. Later, Milo arrives and Cindy allows him to stay, despite Holly wanting him to leave. Cindy watches a video that Dirk made for Holly before he died. Cindy falls asleep just as it shows Dirk confronting Milo over killing Cindy's parents. Cindy gives an emotional heartfelt speech at Dirk's funeral and afterwards, she and Liberty are shocked when Milo confesses to killing Dirk. He is arrested but released without charge and a curious Cindy searches his room. She finds an address to a garage and decides to check it out but when she gets there she is confused when she finds newspaper clippings and pictures of the Cunningham family. Milo arrives and Cindy confronts him and he confesses to killing her dad and Helen 14 years previously. A horrified Cindy tries to leave but Milo stops her telling her she can't leave and he will have to silence her. Milo arrives home and tells Liberty and Dennis Savage (Joe Tracini) that Cindy has gone on a spa trip.

Milo returns to the garage where it is revealed he is keeping Cindy chained up. Cindy begs him to leave her go but he insists that his secret must be kept safe. She tries to gain his trust by telling him about Browning and Milo decides to leave her go but when she sees a toy axe in his bag, she panics and texts Tom. An angry Milo tells Cindy that she betrayed his trust and leaves her locked up. Milo intercepts Cindy's text before Tom can see it. Cindy manages to break free and tries to break down the door but Milo comes in. Realising he can't trust her, he tells her there will have to be one more accident before forcing her into the car. He drives Cindy to a scrapyard and lifts the car into the air using a crane. Holly, Tom and Liberty discover that Milo killed Helen and Gordon and they track down Milo. Cindy falls out of the car and clings onto the edge. Milo, Holly, Tom and Liberty hold a blanket and Cindy falls safely onto the blanket. Tom confronts Milo but the car falls and Milo pushes Tom out of the way and Milo is crushed by the car.

In September 2018, Cindy refuses to let Mac move in when Alfie begs her to. However, Mac manipulates her into letting him move in. When Cindy returns from Spain, she is horrified to discover that Mac let prostitute Donna-Marie Quinn (Lucy-Jo Hudson) move in but Mac convinces her once again to let Donna-Marie stay. Cindy teams up with Marnie to get rid of Donna-Marie. Cindy trashes the emporium and plants Donna-Marie's purse at the scene. Alfie is furious when he finds out that Cindy robbed the emporium and makes her apologise to Donna-Marie. Mac starts replacing Cindy's bipolar medication with vitamins and makes her believe that Dirk is haunting her. Donna-Marie berates Cindy over this and Cindy punches her. Donna-Marie calls the police and Cindy is arrested. A concerned Alfie convinces Cindy to go to the hospital and while she there, Mac tricks her into signing over the house to him.

== Reception ==
In 2010, the wedding of Cindy and Tony Hutchinson was nominated at the Inside Soap Awards for best wedding but lost out. In 2009 Stephanie Waring was nominated for best bitch but lost out to Charlie Brooks. Waring was also shortlisted for Best Dramatic Performance for her role in Holly's disappearance in 2010 at the Inside Soap Awards. In 2018, Wareing was nominated for “Best Actress” at the Inside Soap Awards.

Cindy was described by STV as a "manipulative man-eater". A writer from Channel 5's Holy Soap said "Cindy can only be described as a tart with a heart (albeit of stone). She's had more lovers than she can count and one can't help but admire her ability to land on her feet time and time again." They described her most memorable moment as being when she "accidentally become pregnant as a teenager." An E4 writer described Cindy as "sly and conniving" and commented that her "grief at the loss of her brother Max has done little to curb her manipulative personality". Laura Morgan of All About Soap said that Cindy lost her multimillion-pound fortunes because "it costs a lot to look that cheap". Inside Soap critic Sarah said "there are standout performances from some of my all-time favourite Hollyoaks stars, including [...] Stephanie Waring" during the Enjoy The Ride storyline. All About Soap journalist Kerry Barrett said viewers should watch out for Waring amongst other cast member, who she felt "all act their socks off". Barrett's All About Soap colleague Carena Crawford said she felt "a bit sorry" for Cindy as she watched Rhys die. Di Hollingsworth from Soaplife included Cindy and Ben's hit and run incident involving Anna in their list of top ten soap storylines in which characters get away with committing crimes.
