= Lindsey Butterfield =

Fictional character from Hollyoaks

- Hollyoaks character
- Portrayed by: Sophie Austin
- Duration: 2013–2016
- First appearance: 3 June 2013
- Last appearance: 18 May 2016
- Introduced by: Bryan Kirkwood
In-universe information
- Other names: Lindsey Roscoe; Gloved Hand Killer
- Occupation: Junior doctor
- Sisters: Kim Butterfield; Kath Butterfield
- Husband: Freddie Roscoe (2015–2016)
- Sons: JJ Roscoe
- Daughters: Lexi Roscoe

Lindsey Roscoe (also Butterfield) is a fictional character from the British soap opera Hollyoaks, played by Sophie Austin. The character made her first on-screen appearance on 3 June 2013. Lindsey had been involved in storylines such as covering up the murder of Paul Browning (Joseph Thompson) with Cindy Cunningham (Stephanie Waring) and Mercedes McQueen (Jennifer Metcalfe), having to choose between two brothers, Joe Roscoe (Ayden Callaghan) and Freddie Roscoe (Charlie Clapham), being revealed as the notorious Gloved Hand Killer, and teaming up with fellow serial killer Silas Blissett (Jeff Rawle). Lindsey kills seven people in her killing spree: Rick Spencer (Victor Gardener), Will Savage (James Atherton), Mariam Andrews (Helen Lederer), Phoebe McQueen (Mandip Gill), Dylan Jenkins (James Fletcher), Ashley Davidson (Kierston Wareing) and Dr. Charles S'avage (Andrew Greenough), while also attempting to kill five others: Diane Hutchinson (Alex Fletcher), Esther Bloom (Jazmine Franks), Freddie, her sister Kim Butterfield (Daisy Wood-Davis) and Mercedes. It was revealed during the 20th anniversary week of Hollyoaks that Lindsey had also attempted to murder her younger sister, Kath Butterfield (Mikaela Newton), when they were adolescents, as shown in flashbacks. In 2016, it was announced that Austin had quit the role and would be departing the soap later that year. Her final scenes aired on 18 May 2016, during which Lindsay herself was murdered by Silas.

== Development ==
=== Creation and Introduction ===
The character and Austin's casting were announced on 17 May 2013. In July 2012, Austin appeared in an episode of Hollyoaks as Sapphire, a girl who works in the strip club that Ally Gorman (Daniel O'Connor) visits. She also appeared in an episode of Hollyoaks Later in October 2012. She was then approached to audition for the part of Lindsey and underwent a series of screen tests. Austin secured the role in January 2013 and signed a one-year contract. She had to keep it a secret and began filming her scenes four months later. Daniel Kilkelly from Digital Spy reported that Lindsey was being introduced as the fiancée of fellow new character Joe Roscoe (Ayden Callaghan). Kilkelly revealed that Lindsey and Joe have a strong relationship because she is Joe's one true love. Lindsey is also in good standing with the Roscoe family matriarch Sandy Roscoe (Gillian Taylforth) who enjoys the female company. The character was described in a Hollyoaks press release as "feisty, determined, and driven" and "more than capable of holding her own with the outspoken Roscoe boys". In addition, Lindsey was written as a junior doctor working at the Dee Valley Hospital with the established character Doctor Browning (Joseph Thompson). Of her casting, Austin said, "I'm so excited to be joining the cast of Hollyoaks as Lindsey Butterfield and being part of the Roscoe clan. We have lots of exciting stories ahead." Lindsey began appearing in the series from early June 2013.

=== Characterisation ===
Introducing: Lindsey Butterfield. She's spirited, morally grounded and engaged to eldest Roscoe boy, Joe. Having been a part of one another's lives since taking care of him in hospital many moons ago, the pair have become inseparable. Feisty, determined and driven, Lindsey has no trouble holding her own in a house full of rowdy Roscoe boys.

— E4.com on Lindsey.

In an E4.com interview, Austin detailed her character as "feisty, determined, unpretentious, passionate, strong". Lindsey wants to live life to the fullest and be happy. She is always determined to do the right thing and places importance on being loyal to family and friends. Lindsey, a clever junior doctor, worked hard to create a career and sought guidance and encouragement from Sandy. Lynsey takes pride in her job and wants to better herself by being ambitious. She is a "sturdy member" of the Roscoe family and is closer to them than her own family. She has also devoted time and care to keep Joe out of trouble. Austin later described Lindsey as "quite feisty, but she is also very good; she has a good moral high ground." She added that her character creates "lots of drama, but in a good way". Austin later told Natalie Dearman from the Herts and Essex Observer that "Lindsey is quite a dominant character and is very feisty; she really holds her own and has got some quite lively storylines coming up." The character's feisty side has been displayed through her willingness to fight other characters. Austin notes that her fictional counterpart would never instigate a physical fight, but would always finish one. It also shows that she has "a bit of street about her" that she has learned from her London upbringing. As she is not a quiet character, Austin warned that there would be many more disagreements with fellow residents.

Following the departures of Mitzeee (Rachel Shenton), Cheryl Brady (Bronagh Waugh) and Jacqui McQueen (Claire Cooper), executive producer Bryan Kirkwood felt that Hollyoaks needed Lindsey, a new "strong leading lady with a big heart and a strong moral code." He also viewed Lindsey as the reason the Roscoe family had been successful additions, adding that "Sophie has arrived with such confidence and charisma, which I'm overjoyed by".

=== Feud with Doctor Browning ===
Karen Hassan who plays Lynsey Nolan revealed that she had been working with Austin on a new storyline. She explained that Lynsey returns to haunt her murderer, Doctor Browning, and Lindsey would also be involved. Doctor Browning develops an attraction to Lindsey because of his overbearing fiancée's wedding plans. He invites Lindsey to a lecture and attempts to seduce her in a lift. But she is appalled and brands his behaviour pathetic. Her attitude reminds him of Lynsey and attacks Lindsey. Austin told Kilkelly that Lindsey views Doctor Browning as a charming role model and wants to work hard to impress him. She noted that Lynsey is not stupid and this is conveyed when she becomes concerned about his behaviour. But not wanting to jeopardise her career prospects she acts wary. Austin revealed that Doctor Browning likes her character's "down-to-earth" nature and shares his problems. But the attack occurs soon after and changes their work relationship. Thompson told Laura Morgan from All About Soap that Doctor Browning's attempt to attack Lindsey came about in a "strange" way. He added that his scheming alter-ego underestimated Lindsey because he did not expect her to be "extremely feisty". She is also very similar to Lynsey; Doctor Browning believes that it is all a "nasty joke", but Thompson thought that it was the reason Browning was "weirdly drawn" to Lindsey.

On 14 June 2013, Peter Dyke and Katie Begley of the Daily Star reported that Lindsey would tell Mercedes McQueen (Jennifer Metcalfe) of her fiancé's infidelity, causing a "catfight" between the two. Thompson informed the reporters that "it all comes to a head in an explosive way. Mercedes and Lindsey have a catfight. You have to see it to believe it. And Browning has a scrap with Joe." Metcalfe told Sarah Ellis of Inside Soap that the fight scenes were complex and required a stunt coordinator to help choreograph. The fight took a number of hours to complete as Austin and Metcalfe put extra effort into making it believable. Doctor Browning claims that Lindsey tried to seduce him, but Mercedes is not convinced. A mystery character begins stalking Doctor Browning over Lynsey's murder. He soon begins to have hallucinations of Lynsey each time Lindsey interacts with him.

=== Joe and Freddie Roscoe ===
"It's such an interesting dynamic. I think Lindsey uses Freddie sometimes, without even realising it. She sometimes forgets that she can speak to him more than anyone else. Lindsey can probably tell Freddie things that she couldn't tell Joe, as we've already seen. It genuinely kills Freddie every time he sees Lindsey and realises that he can't be with her. It's quite tragic."

— Clapham on Lindsey and Freddie (2013)

Lindsey is introduced as Joe's fiancé, who have been in a long-term relationship. They share a strong relationship built on honesty. Lindsey moving to Chester shows their strength. Austin described Joe as a character with a troubled past, and it was not until they met that he turned his life around. She cannot imagine a life without Joe because he means everything to her. Callaghan told Kilkelly that Lindsey's love saved him from a life in prison because she "keeps him on a level ground". She gave him aims in life and a future to work towards. He concluded that without Lindsey, "he could be incredibly destructive to himself and to anybody around him".

In June 2013, Charlie Clapham, who plays Joe's brother Freddie Roscoe revealed that his character shares a special bond with Lindsey. Austin also confirmed the connection, stating that Freddie is Lindsey's best friend and confidant. Like with Joe, she wants to make him a better person because she sees goodness in him. Their friendship was subtly developed and played out gradually on-screen. The Roscoe family later face a series of problems which sees Freddie begin dating Sinead O'Connor (Stephanie Davis). Clapham told All About Soap's Morgan that Lindsey's own problems and actions begin to push him closer to Sinead. But he noted that Freddie loves Lindsey and only cares about Sinead. Lindsey realises that Freddie was responsible for a fire at a local nightclub. Clapham explained that Lindsey looked at Freddie and automatically knew. He added that "he spins his family all kinds of lies, and he just can't do that with Lindsey. She's his soulmate." He also branded Lindsey and Freddie's "deep connection" the "emotional backbone" of the Roscoe family. The storyline resulted in Clapham being inundated with tweets asking questions about Lindsey and Freddie's relationship. As the storyline progresses Freddie struggles with feelings for two women. Clapham branded it a "bizarre situation" for Freddie after secretly loving his brother's girlfriend for nine years. Lindsey is oblivious, and the actor thought that her never discovering the truth would be a sad scenario for the characters. He concluded that Freddie should just pursue Lindsey.

== Storylines ==
Lindsey arrives at Dee Valley Hospital after getting a job there. She is revealed to be the fiancée of Joe Roscoe (Ayden Callaghan). Dr. Paul Browning (Joseph Thompson) is shocked by her name as it reminds him of Lynsey Nolan (Karen Hassan), who he murdered the previous year. Whilst waiting for the lift alongside Doctor Browning, he tries to rape her but she escapes after scratching his face. Joe tells Lindsey that he wants children with her, and she agrees to his suggestion. After falling pregnant, she miscarries, disappointing both Lindsey and Joe. Lindsey begins friendships with Cindy Cunningham (Stephanie Waring) and Mercedes McQueen (Jennifer Metcalfe), who have both been attacked by Doctor Browning, which is unknown to Lindsey. Freddie Roscoe (Charlie Clapham) becomes close to Lindsey, who sees him as a brother. Unknown to her, Freddie is developing feelings for her. Lindsey is delighted when she hears that she is pregnant again, but only a few months later, whilst coming home from shopping, she is run over by Frankie Osborne (Helen Pearson). She later tragically miscarries in the hospital. With Cindy, Lindsey goes to visit Mercedes, and they find Doctor Browning trying to kill her, so they all murder him. The three girls decide to keep it a secret. They dump his body in Cindy's freezer, but they take the body away when the freezer breaks. Whilst taking his body, Grace Black (Tamara Wall) catches them and suspects something after arriving in the village to find Clare Devine's (Gemma Bissix) murderer. She tries to befriend Lindsey, but she goes away. Freddie helps Lindsey, Mercedes, and Cindy by pushing the car down the cliff and setting it on fire.

On Freddie's wedding day to Sinead O'Connor (Stephanie Davis), Grace kidnaps a person he loves. He believes it is Lindsey, but when he arrives back at the house, she is there, and then he realises that it is Joe who Grace has kidnapped. Freddie tells Fraser Black (Jesse Birdsall) and they find Joe but in a building that is about to be demolished. After, everyone believes Joe is dead so Fraser threatens Freddie to keep it a secret. Freddie tells Sinead, and they lie to the whole family. After a while, Lindsey starts to develop feelings for Freddie, and they kiss, so Freddie tells her they can run away, but Sinead sees this. Soon, Freddie goes back to Sinead because he thinks Lindsey doesn't have feelings for him. Later, Sinead's daughter Katy O'Connor is feeling sick and asks Lindsey to cure her as she is one of the nurses available, but Lindsey refuses, thinking Sinead is lying. Baby Katy then suddenly dies, causing Sinead to go into a clinic. After a while, Lindsey falls in love with Freddie, and they sleep together. Then, Joe comes rushing in the hospital, shocking Lindsey and Freddie. Lindsey later decides she wants to be with Freddie, but she discovers that Freddie has lied. Due to recent events, Cindy tells Dirk Savage (David Kennedy) that she murdered Doctor Browning, but he doesn't go to the police. Joe later vanishes so Lindsey and Freddie enjoy time together. When Lindsey finds out about Sinead trying to commit suicide, she feels guilty and is later sued to court by Sinead. Lindsey loses her job in the process and is later slapped by Sinead. Lindsey discovers that she is pregnant again but doesn't know who the father is. Lindsey and Joe resume their relationship. Lindsey's sister Kim Butterfield (Daisy Wood-Davis) later arrives. Whilst trying to get her job back, Lindsey is held hostage by and Big Bob (Vincent Ebrahim), alongside Freddie, Kim, Grace and other village residents. She tries to escape, and Freddie persuades Big Bob to allow her to go but when one of the terrified doctors flees, Freddie is shot by Big Bob. Thinking that Freddie is going to die after a large amount of blood loss, Lindsey tells him that he might be the father of her child, as she lied about having a paternity test before. Freddie eventually recovers from his bullet injury, and Big Bob dies after being shot during a fight with Cameron Campbell (Cameron Moore).

After discovering that Freddie killed Fraser, Lindsey goes into labour and gives birth to Joseph Roscoe Jr., better known as JJ. Later in the hospital, Lindsey confesses her love for Freddie, and the pair kiss. As Freddie confronts Lindsey the next day about recent events, they kiss again, but unfortunately they are spotted by Mercedes, and she blackmails Freddie for money. Lindsey tells him to silence Mercedes, and later that night, she is "murdered". Freddie is the prime suspect of the investigation, and he is later arrested. Lindsey believes that Freddie didn't kill Mercedes, and Kim gives him a false alibi. Kim discovers that Freddie has lied about his whereabouts on the night of the murder, so decides to tell the police but is persuaded by Lindsey against the idea. Lindsey and Freddie still continue their affair, and numerous times they are nearly caught by DS Geoff Thorpe (James Bradshaw), a detective investigating Mercedes' "murder". D.S Thorpe then sends a photograph to Joe of Lindsey and Freddie together. Freddie and Lindsey later discover the photograph is of them, so Freddie pays a man to mug Joe and destroy the evidence. While the man is burning the photograph, Joe turns up, and all that is left is Freddie's face. Later, Joe finds out that Freddie paid a man to mug him. When Freddie leaves a party, Joe follows him to the Roscoe garage with JJ and his mother Sandy Roscoe (Gillian Taylforth). As Joe opens the garage shutters, he and Sandy are disgusted to find Lindsey and Freddie in a passionate embrace. Joe then returns to the party and shouts at Lindsey and Freddie in front of everyone. Back at the Roscoe household, Joe confronts Lindsey and asks if she still loves him, but she admits that she doesn't and that she is in love with Freddie. Lindsey then leaves the house, and Joe punches Rick Spencer (Victor Gardener) when he finds him fighting with his younger brother, Robbie (Charlie Wernham). Rick is rushed to hospital, where he falls the first victim of the Gloved Hand Killer. Joe is believed to have killed Rick and is arrested. He is later released without charge.

Lindsey and Freddie become a couple, but their happiness is short-lived when evidence against Freddie begins to mount, but they later discover that Grace is setting Freddie up for murdering Mercedes. It is later revealed that Mercedes is not dead and that she is very much alive after Grace gives Joe her new address in France. Mercedes and Grace are framing Freddie, as they both have reasons for despising him. Mercedes gives Joe some of Freddie's clothing with her blood on it and asks him to plant it in Freddie and Lindsey's flat. At JJ's naming ceremony, Joe enters Freddie and Lindsey's bedroom and plants the evidence behind the wardrobe. The police then find it when the McQueen family shows them a diary entry by Mercedes, which Grace planted. Freddie and Lindsey then go on the run with JJ and are constantly narrowly escaping capture. Joe then finds them and forces Lindsey to choose between Freddie and JJ, of whom she chooses Freddie. Lindsey later calls Joe for help and reveals that she witnessed Freddie violently beating up a man in a nightclub, and nearly attacked her. Joe arrives and brings her back to the village, where she reveals that she believes Freddie killed Mercedes. Unbeknownst to everyone, Freddie and Lindsey are still a couple, and they are trying to play Grace at her own game. When Lindsey catches Grace calling somebody on Skype, she discovers that Mercedes is still alive. After revealing this to Freddie, Lindsey goes to the police with Joe, and she tells them that she knows that Mercedes is still alive. When they interview Grace, however, she cunningly covers her tracks, leaving Lindsey frustrated.

With the help of Sinead, Lindsey manages to get the knife with Mercedes' blood on it, which Kim had found, into the McQueen's house and puts some of what she assumes is Porsche McQueen's (Twinnie-Lee Moore) hair, is actually Phoebe McQueen's (Mandip Gill) and she is imprisoned, much to Lindsey's horror. However, she doesn't confess. Freddie then proposes to Lindsey, and she accepts. When Lindsey finds out that Kim was visiting their brain-damaged sister Kath Butterfield (Mikaela Newton), she has Kath moved, much to Kim's anger. On her wedding day Kim tells Lindsey she saw Grace with a gun and thinks she is going to kill Freddie, as she now has nothing to lose as Esther Bloom (Jazmine Franks) had pulled out of her surrogacy agreement earlier that day. The two then witness first Grace, then Joe try to shoot Freddie, but Mercedes knocks the gun away.

In October 2015, it was later revealed to be Lindsey as the Gloved Hand Killer who has been killing people at the hospital. She reveals it to Kim after supposedly killing Freddie. Kim thinks Lindsey killed Freddie by accident, and also did the same with Ashley Davidson (Kierston Wareing), but she realises Lindsey deliberately killed them. Lindsey admits to killing Rick, Will Savage (James Atherton), Mariam Andrews (Helen Lederer), Phoebe, Dylan Jenkins (James Fletcher), Ashley, and Dr. Charles S'avage (Andrew Greenough). She reveals that she was killing people to fill in the void that she caused when she pushed Kath into a lake. She then says after killing Rick, she couldn't stop killing more people but does not admit to Kim that she targeted her ex-girlfriend Esther. Lindsey pleads with Kim to help cover up her tracks, but Kim is very shocked and disgusted, and locks Lindsey in a room, and calls the police, but Kim later has second thoughts and puts Freddie's body in the boot of Trevor's car, framing him for Freddie's apparent murder.

When Lindsey learns that Jason is investigating the deaths of her victims, she tries to convince him to let it go and to confide in her. Jason, however, ignores her on both counts. Lindsey is later promoted to senior doctor of the hospital, much to Kim's shock. Jason then links the deaths as murders and informs the news press. Lindsey thinks Kim told the news press, and injects her with potassium chloride, putting Kim in a coma. Lindsey then starts to fall for Joe again, and tries to get back together with him, but it is apparent that he wants to be with Mercedes. Lindsey then visits Kim, along with Mercedes, to which Kim then starts to awake from her coma. Lindsey then makes Mercedes leave by getting her drunk, to which she is escorted out of the hospital. Lindsey then takes a syringe, and puts it in Kim's IV drip. Kim pleads with Lindsey not to kill her, but Lindsey says that she must, but then refrains from it.

Lindsey then attends Freddie's funeral, but Kim then bursts into the church and nearly reveals that Lindsey killed Freddie, but Lindsey interrupts her by taking her outside of the church, saying that she can't cope with herself and that she needs Kim's help. Kim then agrees to help Lindsey. Lindsey and Joe then later sleep with each other, and Lindsey thinks that she and Joe are back together, but Joe says that it was a mistake, and he is in love with Mercedes. Lindsey then plans to kill Mercedes, but Kim talks her out of it. Lindsey pretends to agree, and calls Mercedes over to her house. When Mercedes is distracted, Lindsey pulls out a syringe, and was about to kill Mercedes with it, until Kim then bursts in, and fights with Lindsey, shouting that she must not kill again, to which Joe then becomes concerned.

Lindsey then fakes a pregnancy so she can get back together with Joe. When Joe finds out Lindsey is "pregnant," Mercedes and Joe break up, and Mercedes then leaves Hollyoaks. Kim then finds out about Lindsey faking a pregnancy and then pushes her. Joe then gets furious with Kim and accuses her of assaulting Lindsey. Kim then manipulates Joe into discovering Lindsey's lie by making him concerned for the baby's health, causing him to make her check to see if there is a heartbeat, which there is, meaning Lindsey is actually pregnant. Kim then runs further tests, and she reveals that Lindsey is pregnant, meaning that the baby is Freddie's and not Joe's. As a result, Lindsey then hides the fact from Joe that the baby is Freddie's by pretending it is Joe's.

Later on, Lindsey and Kim then plan to frame Tegan for the murders and attempted murders at the hospital by planting syringes full of potassium chloride in her trolley. Kim then feels guilty for what she's doing and stops her from doing it. However, Freddie, who believes she's the person who attempted to kill him, calls the police, and Kim is then arrested for his attempted murder. This leaves Tegan and Lindsey shocked. While Kim is in prison, Lindsey says to Kim that she is going to get her out. But in fact, she planted the syringe she used to kill people and the earring she dropped while she attempted to kill Esther in Kim's handbag. Kim is then accused of being the Gloved Hand Killer and is charged with the murders of Rick, Will, Mariam, Phoebe, Dylan, Ashley, and Dr. S'avage, and the attempted murders of Freddie, Diane O'Connor (Alex Fletcher) and Esther.

When Mercedes returns from Spain, she and Esther realise that Lindsey is wearing the same earrings as the person who tried to kill Esther. Mercedes and Cindy question Lindsey about the killings; she denies the accusations. Esther still believes the killer is Kim and heads to the prison to visit her. When Esther leaves, Mercedes sees a drawing of an eye that Lindsey drew. She then realises that she's the killer after she and Esther read a fake letter of Kim confessing to the murders earlier in the day. Lindsey still denies the accusations, but after more questions, she finally confesses to the murders. When Cindy goes to call the police, Lindsey blackmails them by saying if she goes down, Cindy and Mercedes will go down with her as they killed Doctor Browning back in 2013. When Mercedes leaves the room they're in, Lindsey attacks Cindy by hitting her over the head with Phoebe's copy of Little Women, rendering her unconscious. After Mercedes discovers her, Lindsey hits her over the head with the book as well. She then locks the door to Phoebe's room so they can't escape and contact the police. Unbeknownst to her, Esther discovers that Lindsey is the Gloved Hand Killer when Kim tells her. Esther then goes to the police with the information and DS. Thorpe does not believe her while at the McQueen home; Tegan and Celine hear banging from upstairs and go to see what is going on. They then unlock the door and see Mercedes and Cindy lying on the floor; they then reveal that Lindsey is the hospital killer. They're both shocked to hear the revelation, and Mercedes then says she is going to see Joe as she believes Lindsey would have taken JJ while Cindy rushes off to the police. While Cindy is at the police station, DS. Thorpe is talking to Esther and overhears Cindy saying Lindsey is the killer and takes action. At the Roscoe house, Joe proposes to Lindsey, and she says yes and then says to Joe that they should go on holiday right away. Joe Is stunned but reluctantly agrees. While Lindsey is upstairs with JJ, Joe sees Mercedes, and he tells her what Lindsey said. She also tells him that Lindsey is the killer but thinks she is lying, but she asks him to tell her that he can't go until tomorrow, which he does. Lindsey knocks Joe unconscious, and Mercedes finds him. When Lindsey discovers the police are looking for her she decides to go on the run with JJ. She then goes to Freddie, who then remembers that Lindsey tried to kill him and says that she can't borrow the car he was going to lend her. She then sees Frankie, who is back, and tells her Esther has been in an accident and they need to get to the hospital; Lindsey then kidnaps Frankie. She rings Esther and tells her to go and get her passport so she can leave or she will kill Frankie, Esther agrees and successfully gets the passport, but Kim then finds out and calls the police and tells them were Lindsey is. Esther then gives Lindsey the passport, and she gives her Frankie. Lindsey then goes on the run and puts a wig on so she doesn't get recognised she then gets a call from Silas Blissett (Jeff Rawle). He tells her when they meet up that he will help her run away and he admires her 'work'. Lindsey, along with Silas, returns to Hollyoaks village a few weeks later as Lindsey returns to deal with her sister Kim for her betrayal. She stalks Mercedes and Joe. She then blackmails Kim into kidnapping JJ so that she will give Kath back. When Kim kidnaps her, JJ gets sick, and Kim believes he has meningitis. She phones Lindsey, informing her that she's taking him to the hospital. Lindsey tells her to bring him to her so she can examine him, and if she doesn't, she'll kill Kath. Kim takes him to the hospital, and JJ is diagnosed with a minor viral infection and that he'll need to be kept in the hospital overnight. Joe and Mercedes come into the hospital after, and Kim tells them that they should stay in overnight to look after him. Unbeknownst to them, Lindsey is outside JJ's ward watching their every move.

Lindsey meets up with Silas, and they begin to plot to kill Mercedes. Their first few attempts fail, and Silas even threatens to leave Lindsey on her own, but he comes back after she says she could use Joe's phone to lure her into a trap. As they plot, Lindsey's waters break, and she is later taken to the hospital by Kim, who asks for Celine and Tegan to help Lindsey give birth. They refuse at first, but they then help as Kim reminds them they are nurses and it's their job to help everyone, so they help her. Lindsey gives birth to a girl, whom she names Kimberley after her sister. Freddie and Joe come in later after Joe realises his phone disappeared and somehow ended up at the hospital. Lindsey reveals that she took it and that she used it to lure Mercedes into Silas's trap. Freddie takes Kimberley off her and refuses to give her back to her. Lindsey says that if they let her escape with Kimberley (now named Lexi), she asks Silas not to hurt Mercedes. Everyone agrees apart from Freddie, who thinks Lindsey should stay where she is. Freddie later lets her go with Kimberley, but Lindsey locks them all in the room and walks off. Lindsey then phones up Silas, telling him to not hurt Mercedes. At the Roscoes, Mercedes tells Silas about Lindsey cheating on Joe with Freddie and going back to Joe after thinking she had killed Freddie. When she comes home, Silas corners Lindsey and says he was wrong about her before strangling Lindsey off-screen. When Joe, Freddie, and Kim come back, they find Mercedes crying on the stairs. They enter the living room and find Lindsey's corpse on the sofa. After her death, however, Kim never forgives her for what she has done to Kath.

== Reception ==
Natalie Herrera from handbag.com acknowledged Lindsey's many troubles writing that "it's one thing after another for Lindsey". Carena Crawford from All About Soap branded Lindsey a "feisty filly" and was overjoyed that she fought back against Doctor Browning. But she revealed that she and her colleagues found characters named Lindsey and Lynsey involved in the same storyline confusing.
