= Amanda Clapham =

British actress (born 1990)

- Born: Amanda Dawn Clapham; Aberdeen, Scotland, United Kingdom
- Education: Manchester School of Theatre
- Occupation: Actress
- Years active: 2013–present

Amanda Dawn Clapham is a British actress, known for playing Holly Cunningham in the Channel 4 soap opera Hollyoaks.

== Early life ==
Clapham was born in Aberdeen and grew up in Warrington. She attended St Gregory's Catholic High School. She graduated from the Manchester School of Theatre in 2012 with a Bachelor of Arts (BA) in Acting.

== Career ==
Clapham joined the Channel 4 soap opera Hollyoaks in 2013 as Holly Cunningham. Her storylines in the programme included a relationship with Jason Roscoe, played by Alfie Browne-Sykes, an affair with his brother, Robbie Roscoe, played by Charlie Wernham, a drink-driving incident that killed Rachel Hardy, taking drugs, and a relationship with Nathan Nightingale. Clapham opted to leave the show in 2018, and Holly departed in September. She returned briefly in January 2019. In August 2020, she appeared in an episode of the BBC medical drama Casualty as Claudie Tullet.
