= Jennifer Brooke =

British actress (born 1990s)

- Born: 1993 or 1994 (age 32–33)
- Education: Italia Conti Academy of Theatre Arts
- Occupations: Actress; Teacher
- Years active: 2013–
- Television: Hollyoaks

Jennifer Brooke (born 1993 or 1994) is a British actress. From 2012 to 2015, she studied at Italia Conti Academy of Theatre Arts and graduated with a BA (Hons) in Acting. Whilst she was there she performed in various Italia Conti plays, including their adaptations of The Acid Test, Richard III and A View from the Bridge. In 2015, Brooke did a voice-over for the short film Two Sides, and that October she began airing as series regular Rachel Hardy on the British soap opera Hollyoaks. Brooke last appeared as Rachel in March 2016, when the character was killed off.

Brooke has also appeared in the films My Name Is Lenny (2017), Astral (2018) and The Last Letter from Your Lover (2021), in addition to short films, commercials and a 2021 episode of the online sitcom In Love With My Life-Sized Doll: True Stories. She also played the recurring role of Donna in White Gold and guest-starred in a 2025 episode of Call the Midwife. In 2018, she portrayed Rebecca Harrison in the play A Gym Thing at The Pleasance theatre. Brooke is also an acting teacher for children and in 2020 she launched the B.O.S.S Acting School with Samantha Shaw, which led to them being nominated for "Young Entrepreneur of the year" at 2021 the Club Hub Awards.

== Life and career ==
Brooke was born in 1993 or 1994. She is from Roydon, Essex, and is a vegan. Brooke enjoyed acting since she was young but there were not many local performing schools for her to pursue this and she believed that she did not have the confidence to do so. At the age of 18, Brooke began training at the Italia Conti Academy of Theatre Arts in 2012, where she graduated with a BA (Hons) in Acting in 2015. From 2013 to 2015, she performed in various stage productions at the Italia Conti, including their adaptations of The Acid Test, Richard III, A View from the Bridge and Touched. Brook called her time at Italia Conti an "incredible experience". In 2015, Brooke did a voice-over in the short film Two Sides.

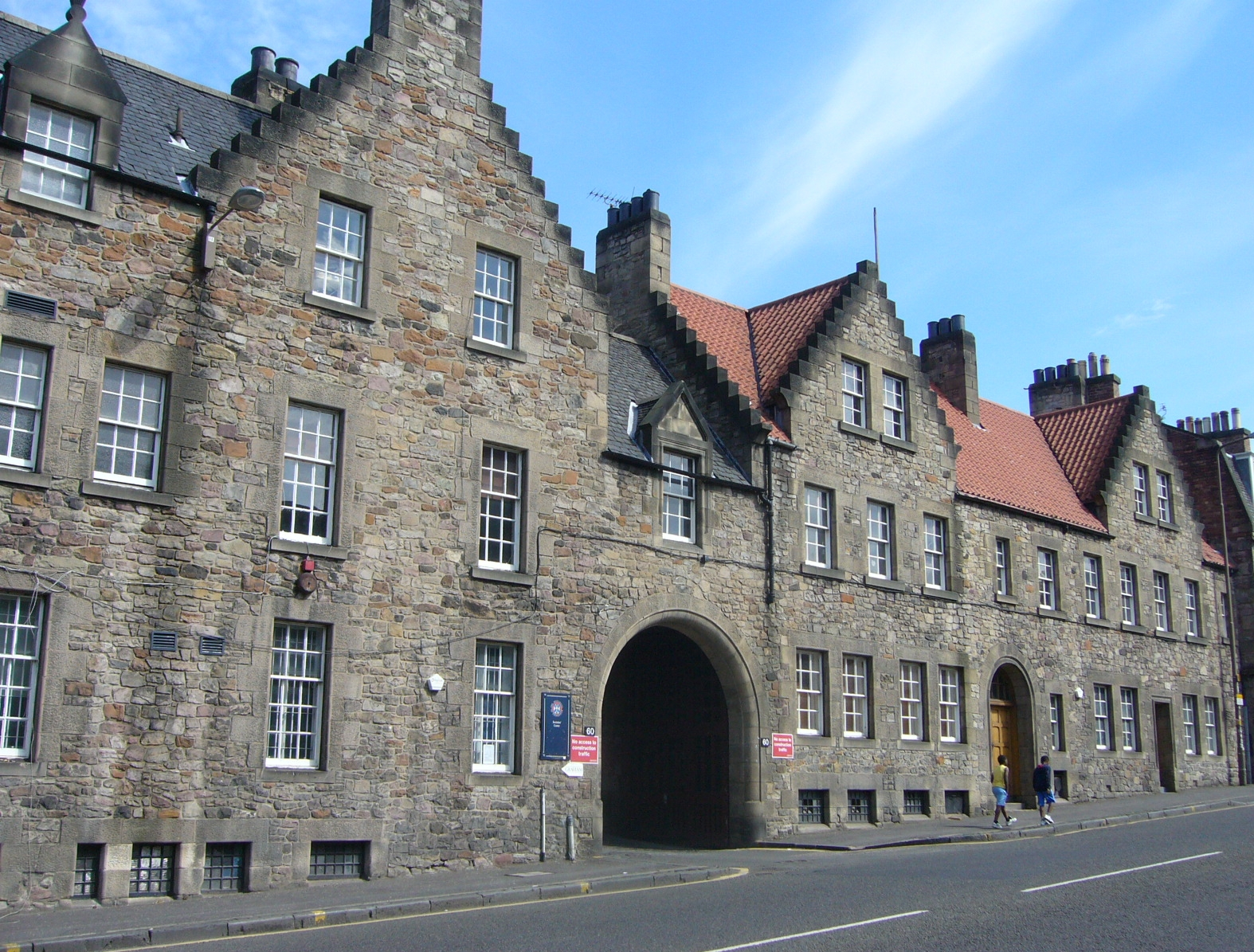
Brooke performed at The Pleasance theatre in Edinburgh in 2018

On 21 September 2015, it was announced that Brooke had joined the cast of Hollyoaks as Rachel Hardy along with five other cast members as part of a new family unit, the Nightingales. Hollyoaks executive producer Bryan Kirkwood explained that he had introduced the family to create "more of a sense of community" in the soap. Rachel was introduced as the fiancée of Nathan Nightingale (Jared Garfield). Brooke made her first appearance as Rachel on 26 October 2015.

Many of Rachel's storylines revolved around their relationship which becomes strained at times, including when Nathan cheats on Rachel with Porsche McQueen (Twinnie-Lee Moore) and when Rachel hides Alfie Nightingale's (Richard Linnell) cancer returning from Nathan. Brooke last appeared as Rachel on 29 March 2016 after the character was killed off in a car explosion. Brooke's departure was not announced beforehand and it was later explained that Brooke had known from the beginning of her stint that the character would be departing the soap in order to shock the audience and create development for Nathan's character. Following her departure, Brooke returned to the Hollyoaks set several times as she had friends that lived in Liverpool. Brooke and her colleagues had filmed the stunt and Rachel's death scenes from 4pm to 4am and had to deal with heavy rain and "hurricane"-like winds from Storm Imogen.

Brooke portrayed Trixie Marks in the 2017 British drama film My Name Is Lenny. Filming for the film took place in London and began in August 2016. In 2018, Brooke returned to theatre and portrayed Rebecca Harrison in A Gym Thing, which was performed in The Pleasance theatre. Brooke also played the recurring role of Donna in the British sitcom White Gold over their two series, which aired in 2017 and 2019. Brooke also portrayed Karina Richardson in the 2018 British horror film Astral. Brooke portrayed a receptionist in the 2021 British romantic drama film The Last Letter from Your Lover. Brooke has also appeared in television commercials and short films, in addition to a 2021 episode of the online sitcom In Love With My Life-Sized Doll: True Stories and the 2022 short film The Chronicles of Diablos. Brooke also guest starred in a 2025 episode of the British television period drama Call the Midwife.

In addition to performing, Brooke teaches acting to young people between the ages of two and 16 and, along with fellow Italia Conti graduate Samantha Shaw, is the co-director and a teacher of the B.O.S.S Acting School. Brooke and Shaw had launched the school in May 2020 during the COVID-19 pandemic, which runs classes in various venues to teach children skills for stage and screen acting. For their successful approach, Brooke and Shaw were nominated for "Young Entrepreneur of the year" at 2021 the Club Hub Awards.

== Acting credits ==
=== Filmography ===
Year	Title	Role	Notes	Ref.
2015	Two Sides	Amelia/Lucinda	Voice over	
2015–16	Hollyoaks	Rachel Hardy	Regular role	
2017	My Name Is Lenny	Trixie Marks	Drama film	
2017, 2019	White Gold	Donna	Recurring role	
2018	Astral	Karina Richardson	Horror film	
2021	The Last Letter from Your Lover	Receptionist	Feature film	
2021	A Pizza	Onesie	Short film	
2021	In Love With My Life-Sized Doll: True Stories	Laura	Online sitcom (1 episode)	
2022	The Chronicles of Diablos	Jenn	Short film	
2023	Shut Eye	April	Short film	
2025	Call the Midwife	Ada Rowntree (1 episode)	Guest role	

=== Theatre credits ===
Year	Production	Venue	Role
2013	The Acid Test	Italia Conti Academy of Theatre Arts	Dana
2013	Book of Days	Italia Conti Academy of Theatre Arts	Ginger Reed
2014	Two	Italia Conti Academy of Theatre Arts	The Other Woman
2014	The Children's Hour	Italia Conti Academy of Theatre Arts	Evelyn Munn
2014	Richard III	Italia Conti Academy of Theatre Arts	Duchess of York
2014	On the Shore of the Wide World	Italia Conti Academy of Theatre Arts	Sarah
2014	A View from the Bridge	Italia Conti Academy of Theatre Arts	Catherine
2015	Touched	Italia Conti Academy of Theatre Arts	Joan
2018	A Gym Thing	The Pleasance	Rebecca Harrison

=== Commercials ===
Year	Company	Role	Ref.
2016	Melectronics	Daughter	
2019	Taco Bell	Instagram girlfriend	
