= Sophie Porley =

English actress and model

- Born: Sophie Elizabeth Porley; 1987 (age 38–39); Thurrock, Essex, England
- Occupations: Actress; model
- Years active: 2012–present

Sophie Elizabeth Porley (born c. 1987) is an English actress and model, known for her role as Ellie Nightingale in the Channel 4 soap opera Hollyoaks. Before starring in Hollyoaks, she had roles in The Work Experience and Jupiter Ascending, and has also modelled for Bravissimo, Tu for Sainsbury's, and Royce Lingerie.

== Filmography ==
Year	Title	Role	Notes
2012	The Work Experience	Model	1 episode
2015	Jupiter Ascending	Sexbot	Film
2015–2018	Hollyoaks	Ellie Nightingale	Series regular; 237 episodes
2017	Tulip Fever	Tavern girl	Television film

== Awards and nominations ==
Year	Award	Category	Result	Ref.
2017	22nd National Television Awards	Serial Drama Performance	Nominated	
