= Stephanie Waring =

English actress (born 1978)

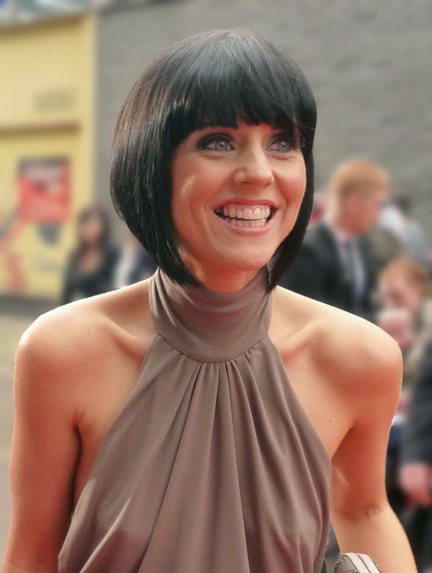
- Waring in 2011
- Born: Stephanie Louise Waring; 19 February 1978 (age 48); Urmston, Greater Manchester, England
- Occupation: Actress
- Years active: 1996–present
- Known for: Role of Cindy Cunningham in Hollyoaks
- Spouse: Tom Thornton-Brookes (m. 2024)
- Children: 2

Stephanie Louise Waring (born 19 February 1978) is an English actress. She is best known for portraying the role of Cindy Cunningham in the Channel 4 soap opera Hollyoaks (1996–2000, 2004, 2008–2024, 2026–present). Waring's other notable credits include the Australian soap opera Crash Palace (2001–2002), and the BBC1 drama series Nice Guy Eddie (2001–2002). Her other television work includes guest appearances in Merseybeat, Holby City, Doctors, and Coronation Street, as well as competing in the tenth series of Dancing on Ice in 2018.

== Personal life ==
Waring was born in Urmston, Greater Manchester, on 19 February 1978 and attended Flixton Girls' High School. Waring has two daughters, Mia, born 2005, and Lexi Grace, born 2010. Waring was in a relationship with Dan Hooper who is Lexi's father. Waring suffered with post-natal depression after giving birth to her daughter Lexi. After dating Tom Thornton-Brookes for one year, the couple became engaged on 19 December 2021 and married in 2024. In 2025, Waring wrote about her struggles with bulimia and body dysmorphia when she first joined Hollyoaks in 1996 in her autobiography, Breaking the Script.

== Career ==
Waring has appeared in various British television series since 1999, including Nice Guy Eddie, Merseybeat and Holby City. She has also acted overseas, playing the lead in the Australian television drama series, Crash Palace in 2001. Waring auditioned for the characters of Tracy Barlow and Claire Peacock, both of Coronation Street, but lost out to Kate Ford and Julia Haworth respectively. Waring appeared in Coronation Street as Emma, a character who had given birth to Jason Grimshaw's (Ryan Thomas) child after a one-night stand, initially on Christmas Day 2006, and then appeared again in Easter 2007 when the character discovered that her child's father was in fact the late Charlie Stubbs (Bill Ward).

Waring is known for portraying Cindy Cunningham in Hollyoaks, taking over the role from Laura Crossley in 1996. She initially played the role until 2000 and returned briefly in 2004. In May 2008, it was announced Waring would return to the serial on a regular basis after executive producer Bryan Kirkwood felt the serial needed to bring back some established characters. Cindy's return aired on 9 June 2008. Waring appeared as her character in the second series of Hollyoaks Later. In March 2010, it was announced Waring would leave the role temporarily for maternity leave; her exit aired on 24 September 2010, and she returned to the serial 9 March 2011. On 8 April 2024, Waring announced that she had been axed from the soap as part of the show's cast reduction, but was assured that Cindy would not be killed off. Her final scenes aired in September 2024. On 26 June 2026, it was announced that she would reprise her role as Cindy and had already returned to filming. In 2018, she was a contestant on series 10 of Dancing on Ice, and was second to be eliminated.

== Filmography ==
Year	Title	Role	Notes
1996–2000, 2004, 2008–2024, 2026–present	Hollyoaks	Cindy Cunningham	Series regular; 1,500+ episodes (so far)
1999	Brookside: Double Take!	Sally's PA	DTV special
2001	Always and Everyone	Linda	Series 3: Episode 10
2001–2002	Nice Guy Eddie	Laura McMullen	Series regular; 7 episodes
2001–2002	Crash Palace	Tina Clark	Series regular
2002	Doctors	Kim Landor	Episode: "Do No Wrong"
2003	Merseybeat	Lisa Solomon	Series 3: Episode 7
2003	Sweet Medicine	Jodie	Series 1: Episode 7
2003	Holby City	Megan Hunter	Episodes: "When That Shark Bites"
2005	The Royal	Georgie Wells	Series 4: Episode 8
2005	Doctors	Cathy Shaw	Episode: "The Family Unit"
2006–2007	Coronation Street	Emma	5 episodes
2007	Holby City	Claire James	Episode: "Into the Dark"
2008	The Royal Today	Lorna	Series 1: Episode 27
2009, 2020	Hollyoaks Later	Cindy Cunningham	6 episodes
2018	Dancing on Ice	Herself	Contestant; 11th place
2026	The Rebooted	Chloe	Upcoming

== Awards and nominations ==
Year	Award	Category	Result	Ref.
2009	Inside Soap Awards	Best Bitch	Nominated	
2010	Inside Soap Awards	Best Wedding (shared with Nick Pickard)	Nominated	
2010	Inside Soap Awards	Best Dramatic Performance	Nominated	
2013	The British Soap Awards	Best Actress	Nominated	
2014	19th National Television Awards	Serial Drama Performance	Nominated	
2014	Inside Soap Awards	Best Actress	Nominated	
2015	20th National Television Awards	Serial Drama Performance	Nominated	
2015	Inside Soap Awards	Best Actress	Nominated	
2018	23rd National Television Awards	Serial Drama Performance	Nominated	
2018	Inside Soap Awards	Best Actress	Nominated	
2022	Inside Soap Awards	Best Actress	Nominated	
