= Freddie Roscoe =

Fictional character from Hollyoaks

- Hollyoaks character
- Portrayed by: Charlie Clapham
- Duration: 2013–2017, 2024–2025
- First appearance: 6 May 2013
- Last appearance: 4 June 2025
- Introduced by: Bryan Kirkwood (2013); Hannah Cheers and Angelo Abela (2024)
In-universe information
- Occupation: Mechanic; Barman
- Father: Alan Roscoe
- Mother: Sandy Roscoe
- Stepfather: Fraser Black
- Brothers: Joe Roscoe; Ziggy Roscoe
- Half-brothers: Darren Osborne; Robbie Roscoe; Jason Roscoe
- Wife: Sinead O'Connor (2014–2015); Lindsey Butterfield (2015–2016); Grace Black (2024–2026)
- Daughters: Lexi Roscoe
- Stepsons: JJ Roscoe; Curtis Royle; Rex Gallagher
- Stepdaughters: Katy O'Connor
- Aunts: Auntie Christine
- Nephews: JJ Osborne; Oscar Osborne; Gabriel McQueen; JJ Roscoe; Charlie Dean (adoptive)
- Nieces: Frankie Osborne

Freddie Roscoe is a fictional character from the British Channel 4 soap opera, Hollyoaks. He is played by Charlie Clapham, and made his first screen appearance on 6 May 2013. Freddie's notable storylines have including learning Darren Osborne (Ashley Taylor Dawson) is his half-brother; murdering his stepfather Fraser Black (Jesse Birdsall), his affair with and eventual marriage to his brother Joe Roscoe's (Ayden Callaghan) fiancée Lindsey Butterfield (Sophie Austin), his relationships with Mercedes McQueen (Jennifer Metcalfe) and Sinead O'Connor (Stephanie Davis), his feud with Joe, being framed for the fake murder of Mercedes by Grace Black (Tamara Wall), nearly being murdered by Lindsey, his on/off relationships with mother and daughter Marnie (Lysette Anthony) and Ellie Nightingale (Sophie Porley), having a daughter named Lexi Roscoe with Lindsey, and allowing Joe and Mercedes to adopt Lexi.

Clapham has proved popular with some critics and the public that he has been nominated for "Sexiest Male", "Best Actor" and more. It was announced that Clapham would be leaving the role of Freddie when the credits at the end of the episode read "Goodbye Freddie Roscoe". He made his final appearance on 24 April 2017, making him the last member of the Roscoe family to leave the series. In January 2024, it was announced that Clapham would reprising the role of Freddie after seven years. Freddie's return aired on 2 April 2024. Over a year later Freddie departs in June 2025 after being forced to fake a suicide by rival Warren Fox (Jamie Lomas).

== Casting ==
The character and Clapham's casting was announced on 29 April 2013. Clapham commented that auditioning for the role "was a long process". He had to audition in London and numerous times in Liverpool, before having a final screen test during Christmas 2012. He went up against twenty-five other actors for the role. Freddie is the second member of the Roscoe family to be introduced. Clapham described Freddie as a "slightly more charming" and matured version of his younger brother, Robbie (Charlie Wernham). Freddie soon notices that Robbie's behaviour has spiralled out of control and tries to teach him a lesson when he catches Robbie stealing. Freddie also makes a deal to sell drugs with Ste Hay (Kieron Richardson). E4.com describes him as a "rebellious and unpredictable" intelligent risk taker who is energetic, but lacks a sense of direction.

In a "Things You Didn't Know About Hollyoaks", it was mentioned that the character Freddie was named after singer Freddie Mercury.

== Development ==
In July 2014, it was revealed that Freddie had killed villain Fraser. It was reported that Freddie would try framing brother Joe for the murder. Clapham said about the storyline "As far as setting up Joe, I think everything's going a little bit too smoothly. I think old Fred could do with a pair of eyes in the back of his head at this time." It was also said about Freddie was going to frame Sam Lomax after her death for Fraser's murder by leaving a signed confession.

In June 2013, Charlie Clapham who plays Freddie revealed that his character shares a special bond with Lindsey. Austin also confirmed the connection stating that Freddie is Lindsey's best friend and confidant. In December 2014, it was revealed that the pair's affair would come to a head in New Year's Eve when Freddie and Lindsey would be caught on camera kissing.

As the storyline progresses Freddie struggles with feelings for two women. Clapham branded it a "bizarre situation" for Freddie after secretly loving his brother's girlfriend for nine years. Lindsey is oblivious and the actor thought that her never discovering the truth would be a sad scenario for the characters. He concluded that Freddie should just pursue Lindsey. Kim Butterfield has made multiple attempts at breaking Lindsey and Freddie up by pretending that JJ had a broken skull caused by Freddie and even an attempt by trying to get into bed with Freddie to make Lindsey believe that Freddie was cheating on her. However, only a few months into their marriage, Lindsey attempts to murder Freddie.

Freddie, Jason and Robbie were involved in a white water stunt which saw the characters trapped in a storm drain. This storyline was part of the Roscoe’s on-going feud with Trevor Royle.

It was believed that Freddie was Lindsey’s eighth victim as she was the Gloved Hand Killer. It was then revealed that Freddie had survived the ordeal and that Charlie Clapham was going on an extended break until the new year.

== Storylines ==
=== 2013–2017 ===
Freddie arrives in the village in search for a business to buy and a place to live by Sandy's orders. However, he finds his younger brother, Robbie Roscoe (Charlie Wernham), stealing money from Patrick Blake (Jeremy Sheffield). He makes Robbie give the money back and apologize for his actions. Later on, Freddie hits on a vulnerable Maxine Minniver (Nikki Sanderson) which lead them to sleeping with each other. After teaming up with Ste Hay in trying to stop an ambulance and steal medical supplies for Dr. Paul Browning (Joseph Thompson), Freddie ends up getting stabbed but survives and Trevor Royle (Greg Wood) threatens him. When Trevor murders DS Richie Trent (Michael Dixon), he asks Freddie to dispose the body.

In September 2013, Richie's father arrives and taunts Sinead O'Connor (Stephanie Davis). Freddie hits him over the head with a glass and rushes him to hospital. To protect Sinead from losing her daughter Katy O'Connor, Freddie decides to bring Trevor down by showing the police where Richie's body is buried, but Sinead tells Trevor that Freddie is going to do so. This leads to Trevor bundling Freddie into the boot of his car bound and gagged. When they arrive at the location under where Richie's body is buried, Trevor unties Freddie's legs before Fraser Black (Jesse Birdsall) rings Trevor to not kill Freddie, but Freddie hits Trevor before he can answer the call. Freddie starts to try to get away, but Trevor catches him. Freddie tries to defend himself but is knocked out. Fraser arrives just before Trevor kills Freddie and forces him to take Freddie to hospital. Freddie helps Lindsey Butterfield (Sophie Austin), Mercedes McQueen (Jennifer Metcalfe) and Cindy Cunningham (Stephanie Waring) dispose of Doctor Browning's body after they killed him. Freddie lately married Sinead despite him having an affair with Lindsey. When Katy dies, Freddie sided with Lindsey when she claimed Sinead was a bad mother. When it was revealed however that Sinead was telling the truth about Katy being sick, he tries to say sorry, but she tells him their marriage is over. It was later announced in April 2014 that the producers were planning a whodunit murder mystery involving Fraser, who was shot dead in the back of his car. It is later revealed via flashbacks that Freddie is the killer.

While Joe is in prison serving time for Fraser's murder, Lindsey tries to trick Freddie into saying he did it. Including trying to sleep with him even though he was seeing Mercedes. Lindsey told Mercedes about it and she tricked Freddie into admitting it which she recorded. Freddie however blackmailed her saying if he goes down, he'll tell the police the truth about Doctor Browning. When Sandy hears the recording she forces Freddie to get Joe out of prison. Freddie forges a confession saying that Sam Lomax (Lizzie Roper) killed Fraser. In October 2014, Freddie teams up with Big Bob (Vincent Ebrahim) to rob the hospital but he changed his mind and when he tried to defend the hostages he got shot. Desperate for Freddie not to die, Lindsey revealed that the child she was carrying could be his. When Lindsey found out the truth about Freddie killing Fraser the shock made her go into labour and she gave birth to her son JJ Roscoe. Freddie had Lindsey do a paternity test where it was revealed he wasn't JJ's father. Freddie and Lindsey started an affair which was revealed on New Year's Eve.

Freddie becomes a prime suspect in Mercedes' murder investigation and he and Lindsey go on the run with JJ. Freddie later decides to hand himself into the police and Lindsey manages to get him out by planting the murder weapon at the McQueen house but Mercedes' adoptive niece Phoebe McQueen (Mandip Gill) is accidentally charged with Mercedes' murder. Freddie proposes to Lindsey and she accepts. Freddie and Lindsey are arrested during their engagement party, but it turns out to be a trick so Grace will reveal to Sinead that she killed Mercedes. The plan works and Grace is arrested. During his and Lindsey's wedding day, Joe interrupts and causes a fight with Freddie knocking Sinead over and causing her waters to break before she gave birth to her daughter Hannah Hay O'Connor. Freddie and Lindsey get married. Later that night Grace tries to kill Freddie with a gun, which is witnessed by Trevor, Lindsey, her sister Kim Butterfield (Daisy Wood-Davis) and Freddie's half-brother Darren Osborne (Ashley Taylor Dawson) but Trevor talks Grace down. Joe however picks up the gun and tries to shoot Freddie but is stopped by Mercedes. The group agree not to mention this to anyone.

In September 2015, Freddie organises an American themed birthday for Lindsey, but forgets to invite Kim. He reveals at the party that he's taking Lindsey and JJ to America for a holiday, angering Kim as she has developed an obsession with Lindsey and can't let her leave. When Freddie is playing with JJ in a toy car he got him, he leaves the room to get his bottle and Kim sneaks in and lays JJ down on the floor and turns the car over to make it look like JJ fell out and fractured his skull forcing Freddie and Lindsey to cancel their holiday. In October 2015, separated from Lindsey, Freddie plans to move to Valencia alongside Mercedes. However, after realising she loves Joe, she decides to stay in Hollyoaks so that they can raise their baby together. After this, Freddie flees with his half-brothers Jason and Robbie away from a murderous Trevor. They drive away to escape Trevor. However, Trevor catches up, causing them to run to a disused viaduct. Cornered, the brothers jump into the river below. They manage to free themselves and are taken to hospital to be treated for their injuries.

While he is in hospital, Freddie and Lindsey claim their love for each other and Lindsey declares their marriage is back on. This is until Lindsey discovers Freddie was planning to run away with Mercedes to Valencia. A heartbroken and angry Lindsey declares their marriage over. A while after her outburst, Lindsey comes into Freddie's hospital room in tears. Freddie assures her that their marriage can still work. However, Lindsey injects Freddie with potassium chloride, revealing that she was the Gloved Hand Killer that had been murdering patients in hospital for the past year. With the help of Kim, Lindsey disposes of Freddie's body. Just as Grace and Trevor are about to elope together, the police find Freddie's body in the trunk of Trevor's car. Trevor is framed and arrested, however D.S. Geoff Thorpe (James Bradshaw) notices a movement within Freddie's hand, meaning he survived Lindsey's injection.

Freddie goes under witness protection by DS Thorpe, as he attempts to work out who really tried to kill Freddie. He finds his way out of the safe house on New Year's Eve, and travels to a party in Liverpool. Under the name "Mark" he attempts to seduce Ellie Nightingale (Sophie Porley), unaware of where she really comes from. DS Thorpe catches up with Freddie, telling him that it's too dangerous to go out in public. Freddie borrows Ellie's phone to call Lindsey, seemingly unaware that she was the one who tried to kill him. He doesn't say anything to Lindsey, but he tells Ellie that he has a wife at home and he cannot sleep with her. Freddie is later heard talking to DS Thorpe on the phone, asking to be let out of the safe house.

After Lindsey tries to kill Esther Bloom (Jazmine Franks), Freddie becomes convinced that it was Trevor who tried to kill her and so he informs DS Thorpe. DS Thorpe tries to place Trevor at the scene, but he fails to do so. Instead, he finds a single earring belonging to Lindsey left behind. DS Thorpe shows the earring to Freddie, and when asked who the earring belongs to he refuses to answer. As a result of this, Thorpe released Freddie from his witness protection as punishment for lying to him. Freddie returns to Hollyoaks Village, and he calls Lindsey asking her to meet him in the Roscoe garage. Later that evening, Joe, Kim and Lindsey head to perform an ultrasound where Kim tells her she's at least four months pregnant therefore making Freddie the father of Lindsey's baby.

In May 2016, while Joe and Freddie track Joe's phone, they discover it is at the hospital. When they arrive at the hospital, they are shocked to discover Lindsey is with Kim, Celine McQueen (Sarah George) and Tegan Lomax (Jessica Ellis) and has given birth to a daughter whom Lindsey names Kimberley, after her aunt, Kim. She emotionally pleads with them to let her go with Kimberley but later they find out that she is working with serial killer Silas Blissett (Jeff Rawle). She reveals that Silas is holding Mercedes captive and intending to kill her; Lindsey only agrees to call the kill off if they allow her to go with Kimberley. They agree although Freddie is against it and Lindsey locks them in the hospital. Unknown to them, Mercedes has revealed Lindsey's relationship with both Freddie and Joe to Silas and when Lindsey arrives he kills her because of her actions. When Freddie, Joe and Kim manage to escape the hospital, they find Lindsey's corpse lying on the sofa. After Lindsey's death, Mercedes tries to get Freddie to be close with his daughter but instead he tells her he is scared of seeing Lindsey. When Mercedes does actually convince him, he spends little time with her and runs off. Joe and Mercedes later adopt Kimberley, later named Lexi.

Freddie later begins a relationship with Ellie, however has sex with Marnie Nightingale (Lysette Anthony), who is later revealed to be Ellie's mother. Freddie worries that Marnie will expose their one-night stand, but they eventually have sex for a second time and begin an affair. After Marnie is cruel to Jade Albright (Kassius Nelson), Jade prints off a photograph she withholds of Freddie and Marnie kissing, and sends it to Ellie. However, Ellie spills a drink on the envelope, and Marnie's face on the photograph becomes smudged. This results in Ellie believing that Freddie has been sleeping with Cindy, but Marnie pays Cindy to play along with. Ellie finds out about Marnie and Freddie's affair by Ellie's half-brother Alfie Nightingale (Richard Linnell) exposing the truth. Ellie dumps Freddie and tries to move on from him. Ellie later forgives Freddie and they plan to move in together, however Marnie lies that she has a brain tumour in order to prevent the relationship from being resumed. Freddie is later devastated when Ellie, after several violent outbursts, reveals that she has been raped by Nick Savage (Ben-Ryan Davies). When Freddie goes for his interview with the police about Ellie's rape he figures out that there is not enough evidence to charge Nick, so he tells them Lisa Loveday (Rachel Adedeji) saw Nick spike Ellie's drink. He later tells Lisa to retell this to the police, but she retracts her statement when she realises the consequences of her actions. The charges against Nick are dropped and Freddie admits this to Ellie and she blames him. Freddie sees Nick at a party and after Nick says the sex with Ellie was consensual, Freddie punches him and Nick falls unconscious into a hot tub. He is saved from drowning by Holly and Dirk. Freddie later chooses to go on the run with Ellie and Lexi when he finds out he could be facing up to 12 years imprisonment for attacking Nick, because of his prior conviction for shooting Fraser. Freddie decides to leave Ellie behind because he does not want to ruin her life and drives out of the village with Lexi and Darren.

== Reception ==
Clapham was nominated in the 2015 British Soap Awards for Best Actor. In 2015, Clapham was nominated for an Inside Soap award for Best Affair with Sophie Austin who plays Lindsey Butterfield. Clapham was also longlisted for "Best Actor" at the 2024 Inside Soap Awards.

After it was believed that Freddie was murdered by Lindsey, fans were furious and heartbroken and then said that they would stop tuning into Hollyoaks.
Fans were in shock after it was shown that Freddie was indeed alive at the end of the Hollyoaks anniversary week.

When it was revealed that Freddie killed Fraser Black, fans were disappointed. There was mixed reactions from fans when Freddie decided to blame Sam Lomax for the murder of Fraser.
