= Doctor Browning =

Fictional character from Hollyoaks

Dr Paul Browning
- Hollyoaks character
- Portrayed by: Joseph Thompson
- Duration: 2012–2013
- First appearance: 23 January 2012
- Last appearance: 16 October 2013
- Introduced by: Emma Smithwick
In-universe information
- Occupation: Doctor (until 2013); Club Owner (2013)
- Family: McQueen
- Wife: Helen Browning (until 2011); Mercedes Browning (2013)
- Sons: Alex Browning; Hilton Cunningham
- Stepsons: Bobby Costello (2013)

Paul Browning (commonly known as Doctor Browning) is a fictional character from the British Channel 4 soap opera Hollyoaks, played by Joseph Thompson. He made his debut screen appearance during the episode broadcast on 23 January 2012 and was introduced by Emma Smithwick. Doctor Browning was introduced as part of a storyline featuring Mercedes McQueen (Jennifer Metcalfe) in which he "shows her the benefits of 'selling her services'". Doctor Browning and Mercedes later begin a relationship, which Smithwick called a "union of the dark soul mates". Thompson said that Doctor Browning and Mercedes "are excited by how dangerous the other is" and are "kindred spirits" who have an "undeniable connection between them". When Lynsey Nolan (Karen Hassan) is murdered in a whodunnit plot Doctor Browning becomes a suspect before it is later revealed he had killed Lynsey. Doctor Browning is described as having an "incredible capacity for Sleaze" and as someone who "needs to be in control and is not afraid to use underhand tactics".

Thompson was nominated in the "Newcomer" category at the 2013 National Television Awards. Laura Morgan of All About Soap felt that Doctor Browning was an "obvious suspect" in the investigation for Lynsey's murder although Inside Soap journalist Sarah was shocked at the revelation of Doctor Browning as Lynsey's killer, saying she had overlooked him as a suspect. Anthony D. Langford from AfterElton hoped that the character would not be revealed to be Lynsey's killer due to his enjoyment of Doctor Browning's relationship with Mercedes and their "blistering chemistry". Thompson's departure was announced on 9 August 2013 and the character left on 16 October 2013 after killed by Mercedes following a showdown with Mercedes, Cindy Cunningham (Stephanie Waring) and Lindsey Butterfield (Sophie Austin) at part of the show's 18th anniversary.

== Casting and creation ==
On 19 December 2011, Digital Spy announced the introduction of the character saying that a "charming doctor arrives on the scene" during a new storyline featuring Mercedes McQueen (Jennifer Metcalfe). It was later announced that Doctor Browning would return with Mercedes to be "heading back into the arms of sleazy Doctor Browning again".

== Development ==
=== Characterisation ===
The official Hollyoaks' website describes Doctor Browning as being "affectionately known as 'Doctor Sleaze'", explaining that he has an "incredible capacity for Sleaze". They add that the character's "driving motivation is his obsession with Mercedes. He's a man who needs to be in control and is not afraid to use underhand tactics to assert his power over the situation". Doctor Browning has also been labelled a "grade A nutcase", a "slimy charmer", "devious", "shady" "creepy", "sleazy", "twisted", "scheming" and "hunky".

=== Relationship with Mercedes McQueen ===
On 19 December 2011, Digital Spy announced that after a difficult year for Mercedes a "charming doctor" arrives and "shows her the benefits of 'selling her services'" which leads her down a "dark path". Metcalfe explained that when Mercedes learns that Silas Blissett (Jeff Rawle) will not face trial she goes into "self destruct mode" and contacts Doctor Browning for sex once again. Mercedes does not take money from Doctor Browning for sex this time although she "hates herself" for it. Metcalfe told Katy Moon from Inside Soap that their night together makes her character "feel awful but she's looking for any distraction, any way to escape her demons". Hassan told Dominique Marjoram from OK! that she enjoyed the storyline in which Browning "took advantage" of Lynsey and Mercedes. Metcalfe said that she and Thompson "loved" the episodic block which established escorting because it was "brilliant to film". She branded Thompson a "really good addition" to the cast and revealed that he had returned for a longer second stint, which sees Doctor Browning "stir things up".

Hollyoaks producer Emma Smithwick said that she was initially nervous about the "union of the dark soul mates, Mercy and Browning, but their chemistry is so watchable - that story is pretty dark". Mercedes begins to "fall for the charms" of Doctor Browning, believing she has "landed on her feet" when he invites her to a charity ball. Metcalfe commented that Mercedes begins to think he could provide her with the WAG lifestyle she has always wanted. She added that Mercedes still wants Riley but she "craves a bit of danger". Thompson also commented on this, saying Doctor Browning offers an "exciting alternative" for Mercedes compared to Riley. On the relationship Thompson said: "He knows what makes her tick, and the two of them are excited by how dangerous the other is". He went on to explain that Doctor Browning initially agreed to pretend to be in a relationship with Mercedes to help make Riley jealous but "he's fallen for her and will do whatever it takes to be with her. He thinks if he spends enough time with Mercy, he'll win her around". When Doctor Browning sees Riley kiss Mercedes "it becomes a question of how much he can take" and he decides he must "make a quick move" to prevent them reuniting. He takes Mercedes to a shooting range, Thompson explained that there she "realises there's an undeniable connection between them". He added that the couple are "kindred spirits" and Mercedes spending time with him will make her rethink their relationship. To dissuade Riley from reuniting with Mercedes, Doctor Browning gets Riley intoxicated and then warns him off of Mercedes. Thompson said that "it seemed to be written in the stars that Mercedes and Riley will get back together - but Dr Browning won't let that happen". Thompson claimed that due to Doctor Browning having incriminating evidence on Mercedes he has "real power, she thinks she's in control, but she might just be underestimating Dr Browning..."

Lynsey is found dead by Brendan Brady (Emmett J. Scanlan). Her death sparks a "whodunit storyline" as a "number of suspects had a motive for wanting to get rid of her". A promotional image revealed six suspects for the murder which did not include Doctor Browning. Daniel Kilkelly of Digital Spy said that although Doctor Browning is not an official suspect fans of the serial had speculated that Doctor Browning could be Lynsey's murderer due to his issues with Lynsey. A series of interactive videos released by the official Hollyoaks' website later listed Doctor Browning as one of seven "main suspects" for the murder, with viewers able to interrogate the suspects. On 17 August 2012 during E4's first look episode it was revealed Doctor Browning had killed Lynsey when Jacqui McQueen (Claire Cooper) finds the murder weapon, Lynsey's scarf, amongst Doctor Browning's possessions. Hollyoaks' official website said Doctor Browning's motives in killing Lynsey were "presumably to protect Mercedes". The aftermath of Jacqui's discovery, including Doctor Browning's explanation of his motives and kidnapping of Mercedes, boosted Hollyoaks ratings.

Mercedes reunites with Riley who cheats on her with Mitzeee, leading to Mercedes kidnapping her and Riley's son in revenge. Mercedes is arrested and shortly after Riley is shot dead. At her trial, Doctor Browning is called forward as a witness when her lawyer Jim McGinn (Dan Tetsell) blames Riley for Mercedes' actions, claiming he abused her so she prevented Riley from seeing their son to protect him. Doctor Browning arrives for the trial where he claims Riley was also responsible for killing Lynsey. Metcalfe revealed that Mercedes is shocked when she sees Doctor Browning again as she does not know how she will react until she sees him which takes both of them "back in that moment when he was dragged away from her. She really did fall for him hook, line and sinker". The actress opined that Doctor Browning is her character's soul mate as he "gives as good as he gets" which is "really good" for Mercedes.

=== Departure ===
On 9 August 2013, Daniel Kilkelly from Digital Spy confirmed that Thompson had left Hollyoaks. The actor would soon film his final scenes and his character will make his on-screen departure in the Autumn. Kilkelly stated "Digital Spy understands that it was always the plan for Doctor Browning to bow out in the latter half of this year, as Thompson is keen to explore other acting opportunities." Doctor Browning's exit storyline was kept secret until the transmission of the episode.

== Storylines ==
Doctor Browning pays Mercedes McQueen (Jennifer Metcalfe) for sex and asks to keep seeing her and gives her more money. When Lynsey Nolan (Karen Hassan) resuscitates a DNR patient, Doctor Browning tells her that the department are investigating the incident, he admits he forgot to write the patient's DNR request on their notes. He threatens to report Lynsey and Mercedes tries to convince him not to. Mercedes discovers Doctor Browning is married and threatens to tell his wife of their relationship if he reports Lynsey for resuscitating the DNR patient. He later promises not to report Lynsey, who is later given her job back as a nurse. Mercedes later calls him and arranges a meeting. She sleeps with him again for money and the next day he goads Lynsey about it. She warns him to stay away from her because Mercedes is not well and accuses him of taking advantage. He later treats Carmel McQueen (Gemma Merna) for her burn injuries and catches Lynsey attempting to view Walker's (Neil Newbon) medical records.

After discharging Mercedes from hospital, Lynsey is found dead and Doctor Browning confirms her time of death. He forges Mercedes' discharge papers so it appears as though she left hospital after Lynsey's murder. He moves into the flat next door to Riley Costello (Rob Norbury) to be closer to Mercedes. He blackmails Mercedes with the papers and tells her that she can make Riley jealous if they pretend to be in a relationship. His wife, Helen Browning, visits Mercedes and warns her that Doctor Browning will ruin her life. She has a black eye and Mercedes uses this to give Riley the impression that Doctor Browning has been hitting her. He tells Riley that Mercedes is lying and she leaves him. Doctor Browning finds Mercedes and they share their secrets about bad deeds. He tells her that he loves her no matter what she has done and they become closer. Jacqui McQueen (Claire Cooper) discovers Lynsey's scarf in his office desk and assumes that he is the killer. It is later revealed that Doctor Browning went to threaten Lynsey into keeping quiet about Mercedes stalking Mitzeee. They argued and he strangled her, not knowing that Walker was watching. When Mercedes finds out the truth, Doctor Browning kidnaps her and drives off. He suggests that they go abroad and Mercedes agrees, but the police arrive and arrest him. At the trial for Lynsey's murder Doctor Browning pleads not guilty and is later acquitted when he blames Riley for Lynsey's murder, after Riley's death. Doctor Browning surprises Mercedes on Christmas Eve and spends Christmas with Mercedes' family. Mercedes is thrown out by her family and Doctor Browning proposes marriage to her which she accepts. When Mercedes' mother, Myra McQueen (Nicole Barber-Lane) begins feeling ill, Doctor Browning suggests she come and see him at the hospital as she may have a serious illness. He carries out some scans on her and switches her results with another patient so it appears as if she has cancer. Doctor Browning suggests that Myra may not have long to live so should remain close to her family and make up with Mercedes.

When he tells Myra that she's not going to die, Jim McGinn (Dan Tetsell), a lawyer, suggests that Myra could sue and get a lot of money. When Doctor Browning hears this he asks his boss if he'd make sure he didn't get fired in exchange for anything. His boss, Davies, says that he'll make sure nothing happens to Doctor Browning in exchange for one night with Mercedes. Doctor Browning says that that was a ridiculous idea, but when Mercedes finds out, she tells Doctor Browning that she'll do it, but then stop dating Doctor Browning.

When Mercedes goes, she decides to video everything that happens, but Davies finds out and proceeds to try and rape her but Doctor Browning saves her. In 2013, When Clare Devine (Gemma Bissix) kidnaps Mercedes, Doctor Browning finds Clare and tries to strangle her in her hotel but Jim turns up and saves her. When finding out where Mercedes is, he tries to save her but gets knocked unconscious with a rock by Clare who locks him in the cage with her but when Clare is arrested they are saved by the police. He then proposes to Mercedes. After the events a new doctor appears called Lindsey Butterfield (Sophie Austin) which infuriates him because he killed Lynsey and that reminded him of her name. He begins stalking her which makes Mercedes think that he is having an affair with her.

On their wedding day, Mercedes confronts Lindsey accusing her of having an affair with Doctor Browning, which leads to a catfight which has to be broken up by Doctor Browning. Doctor Browning grabs Lindsey off Mercedes so her husband Joe Roscoe (Ayden Callaghan) punches him after he thinks he is attacking Lindsey. After the events, Mercedes and Doctor Browning finally get married. Days after the wedding, Doctor Browning begins stalking Lindsey again and locks himself in a lift with her and tries to rape her but Lindsey scratches his face and runs away. He then has a one-night stand with Cindy Cunningham (Stephanie Waring) and after she threatens to tell Mercedes he tries to kill her in the Hollyoaks high school storeroom but she survives and recovers.

When Myra tries to split up Doctor Browning and Mercedes, he hires Trevor Royle (Greg Wood) to kill her but he fails and she survives which angers Doctor Browning. Myra suspects he is behind it and tells everyone that he is a murderer and puts up posters that he is a murderer so Doctor Browning and Trevor agree to kill her. However, when Jim finds out he plans to help her escape. Mercedes learns of the plan and goes along with it. Mercedes gets a gun and points it at Doctor Browning but he overpowers her and locks her in the bathroom and takes the gun. Trevor goes to kill Myra but Jim helps her escape so Doctor Browning goes to kill her. He finds her by a dock and shoots her into the water just before Jim comes to take her away. It is then revealed that she survived because Jim gave her a bullet proof vest then she decides to go live in Spain so Doctor Browning goes to prison. When he gets home he tells Mercedes he killed Myra so Mercedes reluctantly agrees that she deserved it until they get to the loft and Mercedes attacks Doctor Browning. Doctor Browning manages to overpower her and tries to kill her until Jim interrupts and he is arrested. He tells Trevor he killed Myra and he confesses to the murders of Lynsey and Myra and the attempted murder of Cindy and attempted rape of Lindsey.

In October, Doctor Browning escapes from prison and when Mercedes finds out she ignores the fact that he has and carries on with her life however when Fraser Black (Jesse Birdsall) and Jim get Clare out of prison, Clare plants a bomb in the loft where Mercedes is having her party. On her birthday Trevor, who is carrying the bomb, puts money in an identical bag and Sinead O'Connor (Stephanie Davis) takes the bag with the bomb believing it was the bag with the money in to Doug Carter (PJ Brennan) and Ste Hay's (Kieron Richardson) leaving party. Trevor tries to stop Clare from detonating the bomb but fails and the council flats are blown up, killing Doug, Ash Kane (Holly Weston) and Leanne Holiday (Jessica Forrest). Mercedes finds out and fights with Clare and throws her in front of an oncoming car which "kills" her. The driver turns out to be Doctor Browning who kidnaps Mercedes.

Doctor Browning takes Mercedes back to the McQueen household and keeps her hostage in there. When she mocks him, he beats her up. He tries to kill her but gets hit with a shovel by Cindy, who is with Lindsey, and they believe he is dead until he wakes up and attacks Cindy as revenge, however Mercedes hits him with the shovel and hits him again killing him. They put him in the Price Slice freezer but when it breaks they hire Freddie Roscoe (Charlie Clapham) to get rid of the body. Freddie puts him in a car and throws it off a cliff and they all agree to keep quiet.

== Reception ==
For his role as Doctor Browning, Joseph Thompson was nominated in the "Newcomer" category at the 2013 National Television Awards. Laura Morgan of All About Soap felt that Doctor Browning is "dodgy" and that he is a "fairly obvious suspect" in the investigation for Lynsey's murder. She added that Doctor Browning "might not be a murderer, but you can't deny there's something not right about the preying practitioner". Morgan explained that Doctor Browning has a hold over Mercedes due to him having proof that Mercedes was in the village when Lynsey was killed although she thought that Doctor Browning "could he be trying to cover his own tracks by shifting the blame onto someone else". Morgan went on to say that after Doctor Browning sees through Mercedes scheme to solve the problem, "the devilish doc advised Mercedes she was better to keep him on side [...] we’re going to see a lot more of Dr Browning in the next few weeks. There’s going to be some interesting clues about his past, but will any of these lead us to be convinced he’s a cold-blooded killer?" Morgan's All About Soap colleague Carena Crowford felt that was "something suspect" about Doctor Browning. She said Silas was left alone with "the dodgy doc, and the next thing they knew the old man had knocked Browning out, stolen his shoes and run away. Come on, are we really expected to believe Silas could take out young, strong Dr B alone? Or is this evidence they’re working together...?" After it was revealed Doctor Browning killed Lynsey, Morgan said she "had the dastardly doc's card marked from day one, but have to admit that tonight's big reveal has left us a bit cold". She said that the murder was "a crime of passion, but there’s no way Mercy is worth killing for. [...] Disappointingly, it also transpired that Dr Browning has zilch to do with Silas's epic return. It was a mere coincidence that the medical man was caught up in the serial killer’s escape from hospital. We think it could have made a brilliant twist if Silas had been schooling Dr B, and getting him to carry on his work while he was behind bars".

Inside Soap journalist Sarah commented Lynsey's killer is revealed to be "none other than dodgy Dr Browning! Who saw that one coming?" She went on to add that her colleague had guessed the "menacing medic" to be responsible for the "despicable act" but because Doctor Browning was not one of the original suspects listed she had overlooked him as a suspect. Anthony D. Langford from AfterElton praised Browning's relationship with Mercedes, saying he is "loving the dysfunctional affair between Mercedes and the bad Dr. Browning. Their scenes are hot and they are so suited for each other. The games they play with each other are a hoot. I pray he's not Lynsey's killer". Upon the reveal of Doctor Browning as Lynsey's killer, Langford said he had predicted Doctor Browning as the killer but that he "hated that it turned out I was right". He went on to comment that it had previously "mattered little" to him that Doctor Browning could be responsible for the murder "but over the past several weeks, much has changed. The more I got to see the good doctor and his blistering chemistry with Mercedes, the more I liked him. Yes, the doctor is a bit twisted and a bad boy, but he was perfect for a twisted girl like Mercedes. I loved their scenes — they were hot, hot, hot. I really thought they made a delicious and fun couple. But now it’s all ruined with Browning being a killer".

== See also ==
- List of Hollyoaks characters (2012)
- List of soap opera villains
