= List of Hollyoaks characters introduced in 2013 =

Hollyoaks is a British television soap opera that was first broadcast on 23 October 1995. The following is a list of characters that first appeared in the serial in 2013, by order of first appearance. All characters were introduced by the show's executive producer Bryan Kirkwood. In January, Kevin Foster made his debut screen appearance. The following month saw the arrivals of Nate Tenbury-Newent and Trudy Ryan, played by former EastEnders actress Danniella Westbrook. Anna Blake was the only character to be introduced in March. April saw Robbie Roscoe, Trevor Royle and Vincent Elegba arrive. The following month Robbie was joined by the rest of his family—Freddie, Jason, Joe, Ziggy and Sandy. Joe's fiancée, Lindsey Butterfield debuted in June, as did Frank Symes. Danny Lomax and DS Trent made their first appearances in July, while Fraser Black, Chloe and Sam Lomax began appearing from August. September saw Jade Hedy arrive. Mariam Andrews, Peri, Tegan and Leela Lomax were introduced in October. There were three births in October, Tony and Diane's twins Anthony Hutchinson and Rose Lomax and Tegan Lomax and Fraser Black's daughter Dee Dee Hutchinson. November saw the appearances of Fraser's other daughter Grace and enemy Ray McCormick.

== Kevin Foster ==
Kevin Foster
- Hollyoaks character
- Portrayed by: Elliot Balchin
- First appearance: 30 January 2013
- Last appearance: 30 September 2013
- Introduced by: Bryan Kirkwood
In-universe information
- Occupation: Barman

Kevin Foster, played by Elliot Balchin, made his first screen appearance on 30 January 2013. On 14 January 2013, Balchin tweeted that he had joined the cast. Daniel Kilkelly from Digital Spy reported that Kevin would arrive at Chez Chez looking for work as a barman. He described him as a "mystery guy" who "might not be all he seems" as he spies on Brendan Brady (Emmett J. Scanlan) while reporting back to a contact. Kilkelly later reported that Kevin had an ulterior motive for his arrival and was working for Brendan's enemy Walker (Neil Newbon). He added that the revenge plot would continue with Kevin planting drugs in Chez Chez. Kevin will also contact Amy Barnes (Ashley Slanina-Davies) to warn her that Brendan is living with her children. Laura Morgan from All About Soap questioned the plausibility of the storyline with Kevin having Amy's telephone number.

On 20 August 2013, Balchin revealed that he would be returning to the show. A show spokesperson confirmed the news and questioned, "will Kevin be in a body bag after Patrick's intervention or did he make it out of their altercation alive?"

Kevin arrives for a new job at Chez Chez. He monitors Brendan's movements and reports back to Walker. Brendan becomes suspicious of Kevin who tries to flirt with him. Walker encourages Kevin to cause trouble between Brendan and Ste Hay (Kieron Richardson). Kevin makes friends with his colleague Maxine Minniver (Nikki Sanderson), but Walker tries to fool her into gathering information on Brendan. Walker becomes annoyed that Kevin has not been able to ruin his life. Following orders, Kevin lies to Brendan that his uncle used to abuse him. Brendan sympathises with Kevin and they chat. But he realizes Kevin is lying and throws him out of Chez Chez. Walker beats Kevin up and forces him to tell the police that Brendan has sexually assaulted him.

Brendan and Ste attempt to get Kevin to tell the truth. But when he accepts a payoff from Brendan, Walker attacks him and orders Kevin to kill Maxine. Kevin drugs her and locks her in her bedroom. He dumps a rug into the river to convince Walker he is disposing of a body. He keeps Maxine captive for her own protection, but she eventually manages to break free. She convinces him to run away together but Walker prevents them. She escapes and Walker beats Kevin up again. Maxine visits Kevin in hospital and forgives him. He briefly lives with Maxine until Patrick Blake (Jeremy Sheffield) becomes jealous, so frames him for stealing her necklace so she kicks him out. Patrick takes Kevin away in his car before returning with blood on his shirt.

== Nate Tenbury-Newent ==
Nate Tenbury-Newent
- Hollyoaks character
- Portrayed by: Tom Turner
- First appearance: 8 February 2013
- Last appearance: 22 March 2013
- Introduced by: Bryan Kirkwood
- Spin-off appearances: Hollyoaks Later (2012)
In-universe information
- Mother: Cressida
- Wife: Cheryl Brady

Nate Tenbury-Newent, played by Tom Turner, made his first screen appearance in Hollyoaks on 8 February 2013. Nate had previously appeared in the fifth series of Hollyoaks Later as a love interest of Cheryl Brady (Bronagh Waugh). In January 2013, it was reported that Nate would appear in the main show. A writer from E4.com described Nate as "a happy-go-lucky kinda fella". Waugh had previously told Kilkelly (Digital Spy) that nothing came of Cheryl and Nate's relationship because her brother Brendan Brady (Emmett J. Scanlan) had committed a murder. She believed that if it had not happened, Nate and Cheryl would have been married.

Kilkelly later reported that Nate is reacquainted with Cheryl at a business conference in Southport. But she discovers that Nate is a millionaire and was dishonest with her. Turner told an interviewer from E4.com that he enjoyed the opportunity to reprise the role because it allowed him to work with the rest of the cast. He revealed that Nate would not solely be involved with Cheryl's storyline and other stories would be integrated. Turner branded some of Nate's scenes as "very dramatic" and teased an "almighty" offer Nate would eventually make to Cheryl. Discussing Nate and Cheryl with Kilkelly, Waugh stated, "I've always wanted her to fall in love with the right guy and it's within grasp with Nate at the moment."

Cheryl and Leanne Holiday (Jessica Forrest) pitch a potential new idea to a company but Cheryl is shocked to see Nate there. She discovers he is actually a millionaire and is furious with him. However, later the two start a relationship. When Nate starts sneaking off, Cheryl's father, Seamus Brady (Fintan McKeowan), believes he is having an affair but it transpires he is actually visiting his estranged mother, Cressida (Brigit Forsyth). Nate lets his mother insult him, which annoys Cheryl. He decides to stand up to his mother and she commends him and lets him inherit the family estate. Nate proposes to Cheryl who accepts. Seamus tries to convince Cheryl to stay in Hollyoaks to run the local pub, but Nate wants her to move to Ireland. When Brendan insinuates Seamus abused him, Cheryl does not believe him and calls off their engagement. Brendan's enemy Walker (Neil Newbon) kidnaps Cheryl but Nate rescues her. Cheryl forgives Nate and agrees to move to Ireland. Cheryl shoots Seamus dead when she discovers the truth about the abuse. She tells Nate the truth and he forgives her and decides to stand by her and they leave together.

== Trudy Ryan ==
Trudy Ryan
- Hollyoaks character
- Portrayed by: Danniella Westbrook
- First appearance: 21 February 2013
- Last appearance: 18 April 2013
- Introduced by: Bryan Kirkwood
In-universe information
- Occupation: Businesswoman

Trudy Ryan, played by Danniella Westbrook, made her first appearance on 21 February 2013. The character and Westbrook's casting was announced on 29 December 2012. Trudy features in a storyline involving established characters Jacqui McQueen (Claire Cooper) and Theresa McQueen (Jorgie Porter). Trudy met Jacqui while when they spent time in prison together. She employs Jacqui and Theresa as cleaners when they are in need of money. Further storyline details were undisclosed. A spokesperson added that the actress was "thrilled" to join the cast. Westbrook began filming in December 2012 and finished in February 2013.

Jacqui goes to a job interview for a cleaner role at Trudy's offices. It becomes clear that they know each other and despite Jacqui's hostile attitude, Trudy decides to hire Jacqui and Theresa. Trudy plants products on Jacqui and accuses her of stealing. The pair argue about their time spent in prison together. Jacqui becomes suspicious of Trudy's activities and finds an illegal vodka distillery and smashes it up. Trudy makes Jacqui work for her transporting the vodka. Trudy tries to bond with Jacqui and reveals that she was also raped. Jacqui plans to con Trudy out of money but the plan backfires. She sets up a deal pretending to be Trudy with Trevor Royle (Greg Wood). Trudy learns of the deal and warns Jacqui off. She goes ahead with the deal and discovers that Trudy and Trevor are involved in human trafficking. She reports Trudy to the police and she is subsequently arrested.

== Anna Blake ==
Anna Blake
- Hollyoaks character
- Portrayed by: Saskia Wickham
- First appearance: 15 March 2013
- Last appearance: 16 September 2013
- Introduced by: Bryan Kirkwood
In-universe information
- Husband: Patrick Blake (backstory); Dirk Savage (until 2013)
- Sons: Dodger Savage; Will Savage
- Daughters: Sienna Blake; Liberty Savage
- Grandsons: Sebastian Blake
- Granddaughters: Nico Blake; Myra-Pocahontas Savage-McQueen; Sophie Blake; Faith
- Other relatives: Tori Devine-Banks

Anna Blake, played by Saskia Wickham, made her first screen appearance on 15 March 2013. Anna and Wickham's casting were announced in the 10 February 2013 edition of the Daily Star. Anna is the estranged mother of Sienna Blake (Anna Passey), Dodger Savage (Danny Mac), Will Savage (James Atherton) and Liberty Savage (Abi Phillips/Jessamy Stoddart). She is also the former wife of Sienna and Dodger's father Patrick Blake (Jeremy Sheffield) and Will and Liberty's father Dirk Savage (David Kennedy). Anna arrives in Hollyoaks with the revelation that Patrick has abused her, an accusation which he denies. A Hollyoaks insider said that when Anna arrives she "has a lot of questions to answer. Her children are going to struggle with her reasons for leaving".

Anna arrives to care for Will, who uses a wheelchair, posing as Ellie, his new care worker. She manages to fool Will when he discovers that she is not named Ellie. Will invites her to attend his engagement party to Texas Longford (Bianca Hendrickse-Spendlove). Upon her attendance, Anna's true identity is revealed. She tries to explain her absence to her children and is shocked to discover Sienna is present, apologising for leaving her with Patrick. She claims that Patrick used to abuse her and he reveals that she tried to kill Sienna and Dodger when they were young. Patrick arranges for Anna to be sectioned. Will starts visiting Anna in hospital and convinces Sienna to visit her too. Patrick is annoyed and threatens Anna, ordering her to refuse to see her children. She complies and they begin to resent her.

Anna decides to gain revenge on Patrick and attacks him in his flat. As she prepares to set fire to his home, Sienna arrives home. Anna orders Sienna to leave and tries to convince her of Patrick's dishonesty but she sides with her father. Anna decides to kill both of them but her plan is ruined by Maxine Minniver (Nikki Sanderson). Anna is sectioned again but continues to have visits from Will and he later confides that he murdered Texas. She decides to confess to the murder in order to protect Will. Dodger is distraught when he learns of Anna's admission and confronts her. Ash Kane (Holly Weston) arrives on Anna's secure unit to carry out a placement for her university course. She grows close to Anna, but when Will learns of their meetings, he forces Ash to stay away. Dodger soon begins to visit Anna and Ash returns to see her. Will fears that Anna will reveal the truth and begins to plot murder. Anna fears for Ash's safety and attempts to warn her that Will killed Texas. Anna pleads with Will to confess but he refuses and carries Anna into the bathroom where he drowns her in the bath. Before she dies, she was about to speak to Patrick, telling him that she still loves him.

Two months later, Anna's will was given to Will, but after his arrest for her murder along with Texas and attempted murder of Ash before being kill by a bomb, it was discovered that Patrick is the rightful of Anna's belonging since he is legally married her at that time, making Sienna's & Dodger as a co-owner and Dirk along with his children valid. After Patrick's death after he killed by their granddaughter Nico while Dodger is on run for pushing Will, Sienna becomes the new owner of her mother's will.

== Robbie Roscoe ==
Robbie Roscoe, played by Charlie Wernham, made his first screen appearance on 2 April 2013. Robbie is part of the Roscoe family, a family of brothers headed by mother Sandy Roscoe (Gillian Taylforth), and the first member to be introduced. Wernham's casting was confirmed on 27 March 2013. Wernham auditioned for the show the previous year, attending his second audition on 24 October 2012. Wernham continued in his role until 2016 when Robbie was written out of the serial. The character departed on 28 March 2016.

== Trevor Royle ==
Trevor Royle
- Hollyoaks character
- Portrayed by: Greg Wood
- Duration: 2013–2016
- First appearance: 15 April 2013
- Last appearance: 25 May 2016
- Introduced by: Bryan Kirkwood
- Spin-off appearances: Hollyoaks Later (2013)
In-universe information
- Occupation: Businessman; Gangster
- Father: Sidney Royle
- Mother: Betty Royle
- Wife: Grace Black (2016)
- Sons: Dylan Jenkins; Curtis Royle
- Grandmothers: Celia Royle

Trevor Royle, played by Greg Wood, made his first screen appearance on 15 April 2013. Trevor is introduced for Jacqui McQueen's (Claire Cooper) exit storyline. He is billed as a "dangerous guy" and a contact of Trudy Ryan (Danniella Westbrook). Jacqui plans to con Trevor out of £50,000 but her plan fails. He attempts to kill Jacqui and she leaves the village fearing for her safety.

Cooper told Daniel Kilkelly (Digital Spy) that Trevor is "aggressive and a bad egg" and "dangerous", adding that he has the potential to kill Jacqui. The actress stated that had his scenes with Jacqui aired in the spin-off series Hollyoaks Later, the scenes would have been more "brutal". But due to the 6.30pm timeslot Hollyoaks airs in, they were structured differently. But Cooper felt the scenes were scary for some viewers. It was announced on 28 May 2013 that Wood had reprised the role and Trevor would appear regularly. Trevor returns when he is revealed to be Freddie Roscoe's (Charlie Clapham) drug supplier.

In September 2015, Laura-Jayne Tyler of Inside Soap praised the car crash which killed Trevor's son, Dylan Jenkins (James Fletcher), and Wood's acting following it. She commented, "The Hollyoaks car crash was a thrilling ride—but the most touching part was when Trevor picked out a burial frock for his dead son Dylan. Sob!"

Trevor arrives to meet Jacqui who is posing as Trudy. He initiates an illegal deal and threatens to kill Jacqui if she makes an error. After Jacqui rips him off he comes to find her at Trudy's office where she is taking Trudy's money. He attempts to kill her but is knocked unconscious by Tony Hutchinson (Nick Pickard). Trevor begins dealing drugs to Ste Hay (Kieron Richardson) but Trevor soon tires of Ste ruining jobs. Phoebe Jackson (Mandip Gill) contacts Trevor to obtain a passport for illegal immigrant Vincent Elegba (John Omole) not realising that Trevor had smuggled him into the country. Trevor realises that Pheobe is connected to Jacqui and kidnaps her. He also holds Vincent to ransom and beats Ste up for attempting to defend the pair. He threatens to kill Vincent if the McQueen family do not hand Jacqui over. Dr. Paul Browning (Joseph Thompson) arranges a scam to fool Trevor into believing that Jacqui is dead. He does not believe them until a dead body falls from Jacqui coffin. Trevor then releases Vincent and does not realise that Doctor Browning has used the body of a deceased patient.

Trevor agrees to hire Doctor Browning a hit man to murder Myra McQueen (Nicole Barber-Lane), who he believes to be stalking him. He cannot afford to keep up the payments and he arranges a hold up of a medicine van. Trevor learns that Ste will be carrying out the robbery and demands to know the details. Trevor hijacks the robbery, but Freddie, who is assisting Ste, resists and is stabbed during the struggle. Trevor is angry with Freddie and visits him in hospital. He also threatens Lindsey Butterfield (Sophie Austin), so her boyfriend Joe Roscoe (Ayden Callaghan) attacks Trevor. He begins to harass the Roscoe family and in order to protect them, Freddie offers to work for Trevor. Doctor Browning's stalker is later revealed to be Jim McGinn (Dan Tetsell) and working for his long-time client Trevor. They plan to force Doctor Browning into selling his share of The Loft nightclub and leaving.

When Fraser Black's (Jesse Birdsall) daughter Grace Black (Tamara Wall), arrives in the village, it's not long before Trevor and Grace both give into their feelings for each other and kiss. Angry by this, Fraser makes sure Trevor plead guilty to giving Ruby Button (Anna Shaffer) drugs which led her to having a heart attack. Jim visits Trevor and reveals that Fraser killed his dad in order for him to help get Fraser locked up. Sam Lomax (Lizzie Roper) promises Trevor to get him out of prison if he confesses to who his boss is; unaware to Jim, Trevor has set him up to be the fall guy and pins everything on him.

After Joe wakes up from his coma, Trevor helps him escape so they can both get rid of Fraser for good. When they think their plan is working they are unaware that Grace has ruined the whole thing as she doesn't want her father dead and instead Sandy Roscoe (Gillian Taylforth) is the only one left for dead. Knowing that Fraser is still alive, Trevor heads out to his safehouse with a gun to look for him but is instead held at gun point by Fraser, who teases him about his father which infuriates Trevor and knocks him out, escaping in the process. In The Hutch, Trevor is shocked to hear Sinead O'Connor (Stephanie Davis) reveal that Fraser is dead. In a shock twist of events, Fraser is confirmed to be still alive and Trevor heads off to end him once and for all. By the time Trevor heads to the garage, Fraser is already dead but is seen by Tegan Lomax (Jessica Ellis), and she tells the police that she saw Trevor leaving the garage. When Sonny Valentine (Aaron Fontaine) shows Grace evidence of an emergency call from Fraser made to the police the night he died, she then retracts her statement and Trevor gets sent down for his murder.

Trevor is released from prison after new developments in Fraser's murder case which proves that he was innocent and framed for the murder. Arriving back in the village, Trevor is blackmailed by Mercedes McQueen (Jennifer Metcalfe) over their secret that they slept together on the night Fraser died. Threatening to tell Grace all, she demands Trevor for £1,000 or she will tell Grace everything. When Grace discovers Trevor's betrayal, she kicks him out. Proving himself to Grace, he holds Freddie Roscoe (Charlie Clapham) at gun point after suspicions fall on him over Fraser's murder. Freddie teases Trevor over his messed up life causing Trevor to get angrier. Grace manages to talk Trevor out of shooting Freddie by telling him she'll give him another chance. On 25 May 2016, Trevor was stabbed by Nico Blake (Persephone Swales-Dawson) on his and Grace's wedding day. He dies in Grace's arms, but is able to marry her.

== Vincent Elegba ==
Vincent Elegba, played by John Omole, made his first screen appearance on 16 April 2013. Omole's casting was announced in April via his management's website. The actor signed a six-month contract with Hollyoaks. Vincent arrives alongside four other illegal immigrants who are discovered hiding by Jacqui McQueen (Claire Cooper) and Phoebe Jackson (Mandip Gill). Kilkelly (Digital Spy) later announced that the character was a possible love interest for Phoebe. He added that Phoebe would be impressed with Vincent when he administers first aid on Maxine Minniver (Nikki Sanderson) after she collapses in The Loft. Producers used the character to highlight asylum seeking as a result of being homosexual. Vincent departed the serial in February 2014. Although he appeared in two episodes in September 2014.

== Freddie Roscoe ==
Freddie Roscoe, played by Charlie Clapham, made his first screen appearance on 6 May 2013. The character and Clapham's casting was announced on 29 April 2013. Clapham commented that auditioning for the role "was a long process". He had to audition in London and numerous times in Liverpool, before having a final screen test during Christmas 2012. He went up against twenty-five other actors for the role. Freddie is the second member of the Roscoe family to be introduced. Clapham described Freddie as a "slightly more charming" and matured version of his younger brother, Robbie (Charlie Wernham). Freddie soon notices that Robbie's behaviour has spiralled out of control and tries to teach him a lesson when he catches Robbie stealing. Freddie also makes a deal to sell drugs with Ste Hay (Kieron Richardson). E4.com describes him as a "rebellious and unpredictable" intelligent risk taker who is energetic, but lacks a sense of direction.

== Katy O' Connor ==
Katy O' Connor
- Hollyoaks character
- Portrayed by: Uncredited
- Duration: 2013–2014
- First appearance: 22 May 2013
- Last appearance: 31 March 2014
- Introduced by: Bryan Kirkwood
In-universe information
- Father: Rhys Ashworth
- Mother: Sinead O'Connor
- Siblings: Phoebe McQueen
- Half-sisters: Hannah Hay-O'Connor; Phoebe McQueen (adoptive)
- Grandfathers: Noel Ashworth; Rob O'Connor; Neville Ashworth (adoptive)
- Grandmothers: Suzanne Ashworth; Morag Fairhurst; Diane Hutchinson (adoptive)
- Uncles: Finn O'Connor; JJ Osborne; Josh Ashworth; Anthony Hutchinson (adoptive); Ro Hutchinson (adoptive)
- Aunts: Hannah Ashworth; Francine Osborne; Beth Clement; Dee Dee Hutchinson (adoptive); Eva Hutchinson (adoptive)
- Other relatives: Neville Ashworth

Katy Louise O'Connor was the daughter of Sinead O' Connor and the late Rhys Ashworth, the half-sister of Hannah Hay-O'Connor and the adoptive half-sister of Phoebe McQueen.

Sinead discovered that she was pregnant during a bus crash in November 2012, which killed Katy's father. She decided that she couldn't look after Katy properly, and after talking to Cindy Cunningham, she decided to give Katy to her step-mother, Diane O'Connor, after her birth. However, after three weeks, Sinead realised that she wanted to raise her daughter. So, she reclaimed Katy and took her to live with Ste Hay, leaving Diane heartbroken

In 2014, Sinead races Katy to hospital after she falls ill. However, Lindsey Butterfield believed that Sinead was lying for attention and didn't properly check Katy over. Sinead put blood in Katy's nappy after she accidentally cut her finger, but after confessing to Diane, Katy was taken away from Sinead and given to Diane to foster by social services. Sinead's brother, Finn O'Connor, allowed Sinead to continue visiting Katy. After Sinead saw Katy, Diane returned to find Katy convulsing in her cot. Katy was rushed to hospital, but when Sinead arrived after being involved in a car accident caused by Fraser Black, she was informed by Freddie Roscoe that Katy had died. She had high sodium levels that led to kidney and eventually heart failure.

The villagers became suspicious over Katy's death and accused Sinead of poisoning Katy. However, an autopsy revealed that Katy had cardiomyopathy, a heart condition which was undiagnosed. Sinead blamed a guilty Lindsey for Katy's death, going as far as to blackmail Sonny Valentine into getting revenge, lying to Lindsey that she is HIV positive after falling on a needle during a fight, and kidnapping Lindsey and Freddie before threatening to drive into a canal if Lindsey and Freddie didn't admit their affair.

== Jason Roscoe ==
Jason Roscoe
- Hollyoaks character
- Portrayed by: Alfie Browne-Sykes
- Duration: 2013–2016
- First appearance: 23 May 2013
- Last appearance: 28 March 2016
- Introduced by: Bryan Kirkwood
In-universe information
- Occupation: Student (2013–2014); Police Officer (2015–2016)
- Father: Rick Spencer
- Mother: Sandy Roscoe
- Stepfather: Fraser Black
- Brothers: Robbie Roscoe
- Half-brothers: Darren Osborne; Joe Roscoe; Freddie Roscoe; Ziggy Roscoe
- Wife: Holly Cunningham (2016)
- Aunts: Auntie Christine; Margie; Jean
- Nephews: JJ Osborne; Oscar Osborne; Gabriel McQueen; JJ Roscoe
- Nieces: Frankie Osborne; Lexi Roscoe

Jason Roscoe, played by Alfie Browne-Sykes, debuted on-screen during the episode airing on 23 May 2013. Jason is a sweet and caring character who always tries to do what is right. Upon his arrival, Jason instantly fell head over heels for Holly Cunningham (Amanda Clapham) but much to Jason's disappointment Holly didn't return his feelings. Over the next few months Jason tried to win Holly's heart by pretending to be her fake boyfriend so she could hang out with Callum Kane (Laurie Duncan).

Jason was featured in a body dysmorphia storyline and begins taking steroids. Jason begins fixating on his appearance and has a distorted view of his body. In conjunction with the storyline, Browne-Sykes decided to support a Sunday Mirror backed campaign to raise awareness of mental health issues. He told Olivia Buxton from the publication that "there is still a stigma surrounding mental health issues [...] many people don't realise that fears and anxiety about body image happen to men too."

On 19 November 2013, Clapham took over the role of Holly and soon enough Jason and Holly got together with the help of Jason's twin brother, Robbie Roscoe's (Charlie Wernham) help. On Christmas Day 2013 Jason and Holly decided to take their relationship further by sleeping together for the first time on Holly's 16th birthday. Things became awkward between the couple after they realised that they put too much pressure on each other to lose their virginities. Holly came to watch Jason during his football match and the two went back to the Roscoe house and slept together again. In January 2014, Jason broke into Patrick Blake's (Jeremy Sheffield) flat to retrieve Holly's phone for her resulting in him being arrested for beating up Patrick's girlfriend Maxine Minniver (Nikki Sanderson). Jason got let off with no charges but Holly's mother Cindy Cunningham (Stephanie Waring) and his mother Sandy Roscoe (Gillian Taylforth) banned them from seeing each other, convinced they were both bad influences on each other.

In April 2014, Jason and Holly ran away from home due to Jason being blackmailed by Sonny Valentine (Aaron Fontaine) and ended up at Holly's grandmother's house where they stay for a few days. While on the run Jason starts getting ill because of his lack of insulin and proper food and collapses in his father, Rick Spencer's (Victor Gardener) bar. Jason believes that Holly tried flirting with Rick to stop him from calling the police on her, Jason then sends Holly back home where she sleeps with Dodger Savage (Danny Mac). Over the next few weeks Holly continues to lie about willingly sleeping with Dodger and convinces Jason that he raped her. When Jason finally finds out about Holly and Dodger this leads to him to start taking steroids in order to bulk up. Over the next few months Jason starts to deteriorate and stops eating so he can lose weight and even sends Cindy back into a clinic so he can keep his secret.

Jason's secret is eventually found out when Holly finds the food he was hiding in his draws and tells his brothers. Unfortunately for Jason, Rick is killed by the Gloved Hand Killer on New Year's Day 2015, which causes more upset for him. Jason enters an eating disorder clinic in January 2015 where he meets a boy who tries to tempt Jason back into losing weight and taking pills. Jason manages to beat his eating disorder and comes back home in March 2015. After being told by Patrick that he cannot continue his education, Jason decides to become a police officer. When Cindy stops taking her medication she starts to try and seduce Jason and the day before her wedding to Dirk Savage, the two of them share a kiss. Over the next few months Jason starts helping Cindy with her book and she continues to try and seduce him. In July 2015, Jason decides to propose to Holly to prove to Cindy how much Holly means to him and how much he loves her. Cindy decides to take her attempts to seduce Jason up a notch when she turns up at his work in a wedding dress reciting quotes from her book.

Holly eventually finds out about Cindy and Jason's kiss when Robbie accidentally tells her, this leads to Holly confronting him at his work and leaving him embarrassed. Later on in the day Jason is on traffic duty and sees a car speeding off, unaware it is Robbie. Jason and Robbie have a confrontation at the edge of a ravine where Robbie pushes Jason off of it and runs away. Robbie later goes home and sleeps with Holly. In October 2015, Jason is involved in his biggest storyline to date when him, Robbie and their half-brother Freddie Roscoe (Charlie Clapham) jump into white water rapids to escape Trevor Royle (Greg Wood). Jason, Robbie and Freddie all survive but Freddie goes into witness protection to testify against Trevor. Over the next few months Jason is unaware that Holly is sleeping with Robbie. In December 2015, Jason proposes to Holly at her school disco and she accepts, even though she is sleeping with Robbie. Jason starts to become increasingly paranoid that Holly is cheating on him and clones her phone after he finds her at a hotel with a man. Jason and Holly decide to get married as soon as possible to try and save their relationship and move to Edinburgh.

Jason and Holly get married in February 2016 but at their reception Jason finds out Holly was having an affair with Robbie. Despite Holly trying to get Jason back, her and Robbie start a relationship much to Jason's devastation. Jason cannot cope seeing Robbie and Holly together so he goes on a downward spiral and starts drinking and taking steroids, this leads to him failing his firearms tests and forcing himself on Holly. Jason and Robbie decide to leave the village together to save their relationship as brothers and they departed in March 2016.

In 2018, Jason is mentioned multiple times during Holly's wedding to Damon Kinsella (Jacob Roberts).

== Joe Roscoe ==
Joe Roscoe
- Hollyoaks character
- Portrayed by: Ayden Callaghan
- Duration: 2013–2016
- First appearance: 23 May 2013
- Last appearance: 2 November 2016
- Introduced by: Bryan Kirkwood
In-universe information
- Occupation: Mechanic
- Father: Alan Roscoe
- Mother: Sandy Roscoe
- Stepfather: Fraser Black
- Brothers: Freddie Roscoe; Ziggy Roscoe
- Half-brothers: Darren Osborne; Robbie Roscoe; Jason Roscoe
- Sons: JJ Roscoe; Gabriel McQueen
- Adoptive daughters: Lexi Roscoe
- Aunts: Auntie Christine; Margie; Jean
- Nephews: JJ Osborne; Oscar Osborne; Charlie Dean (adoptive)
- Nieces: Frankie Osborne; Lexi Roscoe

Joe Roscoe, played by Ayden Callaghan, made his first screen appearance on 23 May 2013. Joe is the eldest brother of the family, who is always looking out for his younger siblings. With old-fashioned values, Joe acts as the patriarch of the Roscoe family. Callaghan revealed to Digital Spy that Joe is "a guy who's full of love and passion", but that he is hiding a "dark past" that he's trying to overcome. The character was killed off on 2 November 2016 as part of the show's "Halloween Spooktacular" episodes.

Joe arrives in the village with his brothers and mother in order for his family to make a new start. Shortly after moving to the village Joe's fiancée Lindsey Butterfield (Sophie Austin) discovers she is pregnant; however, she loses the baby after being hit by a car driven by Frankie Osborne (Helen Pearson). Lindsey sleeps with Joe's brother, Freddie (Charlie Clapham) after she believes Joe has walked out on her; however, in reality he is in a medically induced coma at a hospital after he was almost murdered by Grace Black (Tamara Wall). She then discovered she is pregnant but does not know who the father is. After the baby which is named JJ Roscoe is born a DNA test proves that he is Joe's; however, Lindsey has chosen to be with Freddie after realising she loves him more than Joe. After Joe discovered Freddie tried to frame him for the murder of Fraser Black (Jesse Birdsall), he helps Grace frame him for the murder of Mercedes McQueen (Jennifer Metcalfe), who is actually hiding out in France. Joe has a one-night stand with Mercedes and when she returns to the village several months later, she reveals she is pregnant with Joe's baby.

Joe discovers Mercedes and Lockie Campbell's (Nick Rhys) affair, and Joe breaks up with her; however, she gets back at him by lying that he is not the father of her baby, even though he is. After these harsh words he decides to flee the village. Mercedes goes to find him, but is left devastated when she discovers he had fled the village prior to their heated argument. Joe returns to Hollyoaks over a week later to patch things up with Mercedes. However, as he returns, his half-brother Robbie Roscoe (Charlie Wernham) and Holly Cunningham (Amanda Clapham) tell him that his and Mercedes' son, Gabriel, died after he fled the village. Joe proposes to Mercedes on a ferris wheel at the Hollyoaks Halloween Spooktacular event. Joe and Mercedes become stuck at the top of the ferris wheel when Joe's jealous ex-girlfriend, Joanne Cardsley (Rachel Leskovac) turns off the power. While they are being rescued, sparks from a fire at the maze cause the power supply to explode, forcing Joe to jump to the cherry picker. However, he cannot hold on and falls, plummeting onto the ground. Joe suffers a serious head injury and his life support is turned off, after Mercedes, Freddie and Darren Osborne (Ashley Taylor Dawson) say their goodbyes.

== Ziggy Roscoe ==
Ziggy Roscoe
- Hollyoaks character
- Portrayed by: Fabrizio Santino
- Duration: 2013–2015
- First appearance: 23 May 2013
- Last appearance: 24 December 2015
- Introduced by: Bryan Kirkwood
In-universe information
- Occupation: Mechanic; Model
- Father: Alan Roscoe
- Mother: Sandy Roscoe
- Stepfather: Fraser Black
- Brothers: Joe Roscoe; Freddie Roscoe
- Half-brothers: Darren Osborne; Robbie Roscoe; Jason Roscoe
- Wife: Leela Lomax (2015)
- Stepdaughters: Peri Lomax
- Aunts: Auntie Christine; Margie; Jean
- Nephews: JJ Osborne; Oscar Osborne; JJ Roscoe; Gabriel McQueen; Charlie Dean
- Nieces: Frankie Osborne; Lexi Roscoe; Morgan Osborne

David "Ziggy" Roscoe, played by Fabrizio Santino, made his first screen appearance on 23 May 2013. Santino's management announced his casting, confirming his character as a member of the Roscoe family. Hollyoaks had announced their intention to introduce the family, consisting of a mother and her five sons, in February 2013. Ziggy is a cheeky charmer who is billed as "confident and hilariously vain". Although Ziggy has luck with the ladies, he is known for falling in and out of love very quickly.

In August 2013, Ziggy begins a relationship with Ruby Button (Anna Shaffer), but has an affair with Frankie Osborne (Helen Pearson) and the relationship ends. He is a model who finds himself out of work quite a lot. He begins modelling for a lonely wives website with help from Nana McQueen (Diane Langton), which puts his potential relationship with Leela Lomax (Kirsty-Leigh Porter) in jeopardy, after she catches him flexing his muscles in the toilets whilst they are on a date. However, they later reconcile. George Smith (Steven Roberts) confides in Ziggy about meeting a man that he came across on an online dating site. Ziggy tells George to go for it, but later discovers that the man was actually Danny Lomax (Stephen Billington)—Leela's father. Leela visits Ziggy and they have sex in a customer's car at the mechanics'. George arrives and talks to Ziggy about Danny, not realising Leela is in the garage and can hear. She blames Ziggy for playing a part in the breakup of her family and ends their relationship. In 2015 he marries Leela; however, he is actually in love with her sister Tegan Lomax (Jessica Ellis). On Christmas Day 2015, Ziggy finally gets together with Tegan, but tragically dies from a brain injury which he got after saving Leela from an explosion caused by Leela's ex-boyfriend Cameron Campbell (Cameron Moore).

Two years later, Cameron was later arrested for the murders of Ziggy, Celine McQueen (Sarah George), Ziggy's brother Joe Roscoe (Ayden Callaghan), Nico Blake (Persephone Swales-Dawson), Danny, Leela's mother Sam Lomax (Lizzie Roper) and his brother Lockie Campbell (Nick Rhys).

== Sandy Roscoe ==
Sandy Roscoe
- Hollyoaks character
- Portrayed by: Gillian Taylforth
- Duration: 2013–2015
- First appearance: 23 May 2013
- Last appearance: 13 January 2015
- Introduced by: Bryan Kirkwood
In-universe information
- Other names: Sandy Black
- Occupation: District Nurse
- Sisters: Christine; Margie; Jean
- Husband: Alan Roscoe (backstory); Fraser Black (2013–2014)
- Sons: Darren Osborne; Joe Roscoe; Freddie Roscoe; Ziggy Roscoe; Robbie Roscoe; Jason Roscoe
- Stepsons: Rex Gallagher
- Stepdaughters: Grace Black; Clare Devine; Dee Dee Hutchinson
- Grandsons: JJ Osborne; Oscar Osborne; JJ Roscoe; Gabriel McQueen
- Granddaughters: Frankie Osborne; Lexi Roscoe

Sandy Roscoe (previously Black), played by Gillian Taylforth, made her first screen appearance on 23 May 2013. Taylforth's casting and the character were announced on 4 February 2013. It was confirmed that she would play Sandy, the mother of six sons also due to join the serial. Taylforth commented on her casting, saying: "I am really looking forward to joining Hollyoaks, which is going from strength to strength under Bryan Kirkwood at the moment". The actress also revealed she was excited to relocate to Liverpool where the serial is filmed and was eager to meet her on-screen family. Taylforth had previously announced that she was in talks to join the serial, saying that she felt nervous at the prospect of joining the serial but that the part was "a long contract so it will be nice to settle back into something". She was revealed to be the real mother of established character Darren Osborne (Ashley Taylor Dawson).

It was announced on 9 March 2014 that Taylforth had decided to leave the soap. Although she departed on 22 August 2014, executive producer Bryan Kirkwood said she might return sometime in the future. The character made a brief return in 2015 before departing the show and moving to Canada.

== Lindsey Butterfield ==
Lindsey Roscoe (also Butterfield), played by Sophie Austin, debuted on-screen on 3 June 2013. Lindsey was introduced as the fiancée of the eldest Roscoe brother Joe (Ayden Callaghan). She is described as "feisty, determined and driven" and is more than capable of holding her own with the outspoken Roscoe boys. Lindsey's romance with Joe is a strong one as he regards her as the love of his life, while family matriarch Sandy (Gillian Taylforth) enjoys having another female living in the house. Speaking of her new role, Austin commented: "I'm so excited to be joining the cast of Hollyoaks as Lindsey Butterfield and being part of the Roscoe clan. We have lots of exciting stories ahead." Lindsey works at the local hospital as a junior doctor.

== Frank Symes ==
Frank Symes
- Hollyoaks character
- Portrayed by: Mark Wingett
- First appearance: 27 June 2013
- Last appearance: 28 June 2013
- Introduced by: Bryan Kirkwood

Frank Symes, played by Mark Wingett, made his first screen appearance on 27 June 2013 and departed the following episode. The character was announced on 7 June 2013. A statement posted on the Hollyoaks website revealed that Frank is "a filthy-rich businessman, who uses his dough to get what he wants. His character's arrival in town will have major consequences for one young lady in the village." It was later revealed that Frank would proposition Sinead O'Connor (Stephanie Davis) with £200 to sleep with him. Davis told a reporter from Inside Soap that "Frank tells Sinead he'll give her money if she spends the night with him. She refuses and goes home, but the next morning she arranges another meeting with Frank. And this time, it looks like she might go through with the deed."

Frank is a football manager who hires Jim McGinn (Dan Tetsell) and his nightclub for a private function. Frank complains about the lack of female company and invites Sinead and Ruby Button (Anna Shaffer) back to his hotel for a party with his football team. He propositions Sinead with £200 in exchange for sex but she refuses. Sinead later returns to accept his offer but she steals his wallet when Frank leaves the room.

Daniel Kilkelly from Digital Spy branded Frank both unscrupulous and a sleazy football manager. A writer from Virgin Media also described him as a sleazy character.

== Danny Lomax ==
Danny Lomax, played by Stephen Billington, made his first screen appearance on 8 July 2013. Danny arrives to teach at Hollyoaks High and becomes a love interest for John Paul McQueen (James Sutton). He added that there are "skeletons in Danny's closet, which could turn the worlds of a number of Hollyoaks residents upside down". Executive producer Bryan Kirkwood added that Danny and John Paul's romance "will lead to dark and unexpected consequences for a number of characters.". On 1 July, Kilkelly announced that Billington had been cast to play Danny and would debut the following week. In August 2014, Danny alongside his wife Sam Lomax departed the soap as they were killed in a horrific car accident while they were departing for New Zealand. A writer from Fabulous magazine said that "there's never a dull moment in Hollyoaks" and quipped that Danny wanted to get involved with John Paul "in more ways than one".

== Richie Trent ==
Richie Trent
- Hollyoaks character
- Portrayed by: Michael Dixon
- First appearance: 11 July 2013
- Last appearance: 31 July 2013
- Introduced by: Bryan Kirkwood
In-universe information
- Occupation: Detective Sergeant
- Father: Don Trent

Richie Trent, played by Michael Dixon, made his first screen appearance on 11 July 2013. The character was first announced by Stephanie Davis when she was interviewed by Laura Morgan from All About Soap. Dixon's management revealed that he would star in nine episodes of Hollyoaks. Davis said that her character Sinead O'Connor (Stephanie Davis) meets Richie at a hotel and he flirts with her knowing that she is a prostitute. but Sinead does not realise that Richie is a police officer. Sinead attempts to steal Richie's money but he catches her. Davis said that "Sinead thinks Trent's going to turn violent, but he simply makes her a proposition—she can stay, sleep with him, and then she can walk away with £200 from his wallet." Richie turns at Sinead's home to investigate allegations that Ste Hay (Kieron Richardson) is drug dealing. Davis revealed that Richie blackmails Sinead into turning Ste in or he will arrest her for robbery.

Richie meets Sinead in a hotel bar and invites her back to his room. Sinead attempts to steal his wallet but he catches her. Richie offers Sinead money for sex and she obliges. Richie later arrives to carry out a drug raid at Sinead and Ste's flat. He realises that Sinead lied about her identity and takes her in for questioning. He threatens to charge her with theft if she does not exchange information about Ste. She refuses but Richie bribes Sinead to set Ste up in exchange for an injunction order against her step-mother Diane O'Connor (Alex Fletcher). Richie forces Sinead to attempt to expose Trevor Royle (Greg Wood) as a criminal. She begins work at her club but when she cons his client Trevor attacks Sinead. Richie convinces Sinead to make a statement against Trevor but the CPS do not prosecute. Richie vows to protect Sinead from Trevor and they sleep together. He asks her to move in with him but Trevor breaks into Richie's house and murders him. He pays Freddie Roscoe (Charlie Clapham) to dispose of his body and taunts Sinead over Richie's death.

Rebecca Bowden from Yahoo! said that Richie is a "much younger [and] wealthy potential target" for Sinead, but noted that he is not "as dumb" as her other clients.

== Fraser Black ==
Fraser Black
- Hollyoaks character
- Portrayed by: Jesse Birdsall
- Duration: 2013–2014
- First appearance: 8 August 2013
- Last appearance: 21 July 2014
- Introduced by: Bryan Kirkwood
In-universe information
- Occupation: Club owner Gangster; Businessman
- Father: Froggy Black
- Half-brothers: Connor "Sully" Sullivan
- Wife: Tracey Donovan (backstory); Sandy Roscoe (2013–2014)
- Sons: Rex Gallagher
- Daughters: Grace Black; Clare Devine; Dee Dee Hutchinson
- Adoptive sons: Ro Hutchinson
- Stepsons: Joe Roscoe; Freddie Roscoe; Ziggy Roscoe; Jason Roscoe; Robbie Roscoe; Darren Osborne
- Grandsons: Rex Gallagher; Curtis Royle

Fraser Black, played by Jesse Birdsall, made his first on-screen appearance on 8 August 2013. Daniel Kilkelly announced the character and Birdsall's casting on 31 July 2013. The writer revealed that he would be introduced as a love interest for Sandy Roscoe (Gillian Taylforth). Sandy's son Joe Roscoe (Ayden Callaghan) attempts to get Fraser and Sandy together because he does not approve of her relationship with Dodger Savage (Danny Mac).

Fraser approaches the Roscoe family with the offer of business to service his fleet of cars. He begins dating Sandy following an intervention from her children. Fraser meets Sandy for a drink, but Dodger also competes for her attention. Fraser tells Sandy that he would like a serious relationship and warns her to choose between himself and Dodger. Fraser tells Dodger to stay away from Sandy or Fraser will kill him.

It becomes clear that Fraser is a serial criminal and works alongside Trevor Royle (Greg Wood). He attempts to kill Joe and hides the fact he is in a hospital, when everyone believes he has fled the area and abandoned everybody. He also kills Jim McGinn (Dan Tetsell). Joe escapes from the hospital, with the help of Trevor, which Fraser isn't aware of. He is quickly brought back into hospital, where his brother Freddie Roscoe (Charlie Clapham) and Lindsey Butterfield (Sophie Austin) notice him being brought in. They inform the family and Robbie finds Fraser's book, proving that Fraser had planned to kill Joe. Fraser then frames his daughter Grace Black (Tamara Wall) for the attempted murder, for which she gets bail. Fraser also attempts to frame Ste Hay (Kieron Richardson) for crashing into Sinead O'Connor's (Stephanie Davis) car and fleeing the scene, with a policeman's body in the boot. Ste, under pressure from Fraser, continually agrees that it was himself who did it.

In April 2014, Grace decides she wants to murder Fraser. Joe and Trevor help to plan how to kill him, setting up a tracking device on his phone. Sonny Valentine (Aaron Fontaine) and Sam Lomax (Lizzie Roper), who are in the police force, are adamant that Fraser committed both crimes. After planning to leave the area with his daughter Rose Lomax, by tricking Rose's mother Tegan Lomax (Jessica Ellis) that he wants to take her as well, Fraser is shot dead in the seat of his car and is found by a distraught Tegan. It is later revealed that Freddie is Fraser's killer.

It was revealed on 27 August 2025 that Fraser had raped his daughter Grace when she was a teenager, this resulted in the birth of Rex Gallagher (Jonny Labey), making Rex his Son and Grandson.

== Chloe ==
Chloe, played by Susan Loughnane, made her first on-screen appearance on 12 August 2013. Daniel Kilkelly from Digital Spy announced details of the character on 6 August 2013. He revealed that Chloe arrives in Hollyoaks to visit her son Matthew McQueen. She acted as a surrogate mother so John Paul McQueen (James Sutton) and Craig Dean (Guy Burnet) could begin a family. She pretends to want to visit Matthew, then reveals that she needs £5000. When John Paul refuses she threatens to take Matthew away claiming that Craig is the father. Sutton told Kilkelly that he enjoyed filming with Loughnane and they had fun working on the storyline. He detailed how Chloe and John Paul had become best friends while living in Ireland. They share a lot of history and he has previously been there to bail her out of money troubles.

== DI Alistair Banks ==
DI Alistair Banks
- Hollyoaks character
- Portrayed by: Drew Cain
- Duration: 2013–2014, 2016, 2019, 2022–2025
- First appearance: 16 August 2013
- Last appearance: 2 June 2025
- Introduced by: Bryan Kirkwood (2013, 2016, 2019); Lucy Allen (2022); Hannah Cheers and Angelo Abela (2024)
In-universe information
- Occupation: Detective inspector
- Wife: Clare Devine (2015–2025)
- Adoptive daughters: Tori Devine-Banks

Detective Inspector Alistair Banks, played by Drew Cain, made his first appearance on 16 August 2013. He is a detective inspector who has investigated multiple crimes since his introduction.

In January 2025, he was promoted to regular cast. It was revealed that he would be "pairing up with Donny Clark (Louis Emerick) to become Hollyoaks' answer to Starsky and Hutch is DI Banks the soap's resident copper who's set to rise up the ranks to become a fully-fledged cast member this year. The no-nonsense Scotsman plays bad cop to Donny's good cop, but we might get a glimpse of a smile across that grumpy face as he lets his guard down and attracts the charms of a local lady – who could that be? And will a romantic distraction take the DI's mind off the job and let the bad guys run riot?"

On 2 June 2025 Banks is shot dead as his wrongdoings catch up with him as he attempts to kill his captives Frankie Osborne (Isabelle Smith), Dillon Ray (Nathaniel Dass) and Vicky Grant (Anya Lawrence) after a failed human auction bid. The three of them find a stash of guns in The Loft and all fire a shot at Banks making it unknown who killed him.

== Sam Lomax ==
Sam Lomax
- Hollyoaks character
- Portrayed by: Lizzie Roper
- Duration: 2013–2014
- First appearance: 20 August 2013
- Last appearance: 5 August 2014
- Introduced by: Bryan Kirkwood
In-universe information
- Other names: Sam Lacey (maiden name); DI Lacey (detective name)
- Occupation: Detective Inspector
- Sisters: Susan Lacey
- Husband: Danny Lomax
- Daughters: Leela Lomax; Tegan Lomax
- Stepsons: Ste Hay
- Grandsons: Daniel Lomax
- Granddaughters: Peri Lomax; Dee Dee Hutchinson; Rose Lomax (adoptive); Clara Dexter
- Other relatives: Steph Cunningham-Lomax

Sam Lomax (also known as DI Lacey), played by Lizzie Roper, made her first on-screen appearance on 20 August 2013. Sam and Roper's casting was announced on 19 August, shortly after she made an appearance in E4's first look broadcast. Producers did not reveal Roper's casting beforehand as they wanted her character to be a surprise for viewers. Sam is the wife of Hollyoaks High teacher Danny Lomax (Stephen Billington). Roper stated "I'm so lucky getting to play Sam: one moment she's fun and feisty starting food fights, the next she's facing up to gangsters and doing everything she can to bring them to justice. She's not afraid of anything and has got a heart of gold, but when it comes to her family she's a lioness—don't mess with her!" Daniel Kilkelly from Digital Spy reported that Sam would become a prominent character on-screen as Danny's storyline continues and their daughters arrive. In September 2013, the show announced the arrival of Sam and Danny's three daughters, Leela, Tegan and Peri Lomax, played by Kirsty-Leigh Porter, Jessica Ellis and Ruby O'Donnell, respectively, named after Doctor Who companions of the 1970s and 1980s.

Sam drives Danny to and from work unaware he is having an affair. Sam breaks up a row between John Paul McQueen (James Sutton) and Darren Osborne (Ashley Taylor Dawson) and reveals she is a police officer. Sam is excited due to her wedding anniversary, unaware that Danny plans on spending the evening with John Paul. Sam later witnesses Cindy Cunningham (Stephanie Waring) slapping John Paul's half-sister Mercedes McQueen (Jennifer Metcalfe) in the street. Sam suspects something is wrong and later ends up bringing Cindy and Mercedes in, alongside Lindsey Butterfield (Sophie Austin) for the murder of Mercedes' husband Dr. Paul Browning (Joseph Thompson) and once she finds out they killed him, she lets them go and vows not to tell anybody about what happened. Sam then discovers John Paul has been raped and takes him to the hospital to be examined, and provides support for him. However, once she discovers he and Danny were having an affair, she gets him put into prison for the assault of his rapist Finn O'Connor (Keith Rice). Sam discovers that Leela's boyfriend Cameron Campbell (Cameron Moore) has been released from prison and he kidnaps her, but she escapes after revealing she got him locked up. She and Danny plan to leave the village with their family to escape from Cameron, but Leela reveals she and Cameron are Peri's parents to her, so Sam and Danny attempt to flee the village on their own, leaving Leela, Tegan and Peri behind. Tegan and Peri later sneak away and contact Sam and Danny, begging them to come and pick them up, but before they can, an unknown car smashes into theirs, killing Sam and Danny. The family learn of this, and the unknown driver is later revealed to be Cameron.

== Jade Hedy ==
Jade Hedy
- Hollyoaks character
- Portrayed by: Lucy Gape
- First appearance: 13 September 2013
- Last appearance: 17 October 2013
- Introduced by: Bryan Kirkwood
- Spin-off appearances: Hollyoaks Later (2013)
In-universe information
- Occupation: Student (until 2013)

Jade Hedy, played by Lucy Gape, made her first on-screen appearance on 13 September 2013. The character was announced by executive producer Bryan Kirkwood on 13 July 2013. Hollyoaks usually introduces freshers as new characters. Kirkwood revealed that Jade is the only new character in the freshers group. He wanted to focus on the established characters Tilly Evans (Lucy Dixon) and George Smith (Steven Roberts) and their transition into university. They will move into a "knackered old student house" which replaces the old student halls set.

Jade approaches Esther Bloom (Jazmine Franks) at a Freshers party and introduces herself. She ignores Tilly and later turns up inside her house revealing that landlord Dennis Savage (Joe Tracini) has let her move in. In Hollyoaks Later, Jade is seen getting close with Esther which Tilly becomes wary of. Jade suggests the three have a threesome, which Esther and Tilly reluctantly agree to. Jade becomes interested in Esther's stitches from her transplant. It is later revealed that this is because Jade's boyfriend was the organ donor. When Jade's boyfriend dies, Jade holds Esther captive in a dark room. Jade then stabs Callum Kane (Laurie Duncan) with a samurai sword through his back when he attempts to rescue Esther. Eventually, Esther escapes with Tilly and Jade follows them. This progresses into a chase sequence which ends with Jade falling onto her own knife. Tilly and Esther sit next to Jade and comfort her whilst she dies.

== Peri Lomax ==
Peri Lomax, played by Ruby O'Donnell, made her first on-screen appearance on 4 October 2013. The character and O'Donnell's casting was announced on 17 September 2013. O'Donnell auditioned for the role of Peri and was invited back twice, before she learned she had got the part. Her mother commented "When we got the call I started crying and then we started jumping up and down in the kitchen. The more I see the scripts the more I think Ruby is quite similar to her character Peri and I think she's fitted in well with the family." O'Donnell began filming during the summer months.

== Mariam Andrews ==
Mariam Andrews
- Hollyoaks character
- Portrayed by: Helen Lederer
- Duration: 2013, 2015
- First appearance: 23 October 2013
- Last appearance: 12 May 2015
- Introduced by: Bryan Kirkwood (2013, 2015)
In-universe information
- Husband: Dr. Charles S'avage (backstory)
- Stepsons: Dennis Savage (backstory)

Mariam Andrews, played by Helen Lederer, made her first on-screen appearance on 23 October 2013. Lederer's casting was announced on 10 August 2013. Mariam is a midwife who delivers Anthony and Dee Dee Hutchinson. She later realises Tegan Lomax (Jessica Ellis) is in labour and helps deliver her daughter, Rose. It is later revealed that she was drunk when she delivered them and so she accidentally swapped Rose and Dee Dee. Following this reveal she blackmails Dr. Charles S'avage (Andrew Greenough) so she can get off the hook. Dr. S'avage has her sectioned as a result. Whilst sectioned she meets Sienna Blake (Anna Passey) and reveals that she had accidentally swapped the babies, Sienna then gets Mariam drunk in a hope to learn Dr. S'avage's secret so she can leave the ward. When Mariam is discharged from the ward she asks Dr. S'avage for her old job back. When she sees Sienna embrace Dr. S'avage, she reveals to Sienna that he didn't pass his medical examinations and therefore isn't a real doctor. Mariam discovered evidence that possibly proved Dr. S'avage was the Gloved Hand Killer. When printing out the copies of the murdered victims, the killer enters the office, sneaks up on her, and fatally injects her with a large dose of potassium chloride, killing her instantly. Sienna finds her dead in the office. On the day of her death, she had arguments with both Tegan and Dr. S'avage, making them possible suspects, but her death is later ruled as a heart attack caused by her alcoholism. The killer is later revealed as Lindsey Roscoe (Sophie Austin).

== Tegan Lomax ==
Tegan Lomax
- Hollyoaks character
- Portrayed by: Jessica Ellis
- Duration: 2013–2018
- First appearance: 23 October 2013
- Last appearance: 25 October 2018
- Introduced by: Bryan Kirkwood
In-universe information
- Occupation: Student nurse (2013−2016); Staff nurse (2016−2018)
- Father: Danny Lomax
- Mother: Sam Lomax
- Sisters: Leela Lomax
- Half-brothers: Ste Hay
- Daughters: Dee Dee Hutchinson
- Adoptive sons: Ro Hutchinson
- Aunts: Libby Lomax; Susan Lacey
- Nephews: Lucas Hay; Daniel Lomax
- Nieces: Peri Lomax; Leah Barnes; Hannah Hay-O'Connor; Steph Cunningham-Lomax
- First cousins: Angela Brown

Tegan Lomax, played by Jessica Ellis, made her first appearance on 23 October 2013. The character and casting was announced on 17 September 2013. Tegan is a member of the Lomax family, which consists of parents Danny (Stephen Billington) and Sam (Lizzie Roper) and siblings Peri (Ruby O'Donnell) and Leela (Kirsty-Leigh Porter). In "a shocking twist", Tegan gave birth to a daughter within hours of arriving on-screen, having been unaware that she was pregnant. Describing Tegan, a writer for the show's official website stated "She's exciting, warm and full of cracking one-liners. She always sees the best in people—a quality which we ruddy admire!" Ellis was written out of the series in 2018 and Tegan departs in October 2018, five years after her arrival. The actress expressed her sadness at her departure. Kirkwood confirmed that Tegan's exit would mark the beginning of a "very different direction" for the Lomax family.

Tegan's death was nominated for "Most devastating Soap Death" at the 2018 Digital Spy Reader Awards; it came in fourth place with 9.7% of the total votes.

Tegan first appears at Dee Valley Hospital, where she gives birth to a daughter, Rose Lomax. It soon emerges that gangster Fraser Black (Jesse Birdsall) is Rose's father. He persuades Tegan to leave with him and Rose, but kidnaps Rose instead. However, before he can leave, Fraser is killed. Tegan is questioned by the police, but released without charge. Tegan later runs for student secretary against Blessing Chambers (Modupe Adeyeye), who she defends when it is revealed that Blessing is transgender. Tegan is devastated when Sam and Danny are killed in a car accident. Tegan develops an attraction to Leela's boyfriend, Ziggy Roscoe (Fabrizio Santino). When they become trapped together during a siege at the hospital, Tegan and Ziggy have sex. Tegan becomes pregnant and Cameron Campbell (Cameron Moore) tells Leela about their infidelity, straining the sisters' relationship. Tegan confides in Ziggy that she is not pregnant and that the cancer, which she developed as a child, has returned. Ziggy supports Tegan through her treatment and when Cameron learns that Tegan has cancer, he encourages her to tell Leela; she does and they reconcile.

When Rose becomes ill, Tegan donates blood to her through a transfusion, although this worsens Rose's condition and it emerges that Rose is not Tegan's biological daughter. Tegan and Celine McQueen (Sarah George) discovers that Diane O'Connor (Alex Fletcher) and Tony Hutchinson's (Nick Pickard) daughter, Dee Dee Hutchinson (Annabelle and Charlotte White; Lacey Findlow), is her biological daughter and Rose is Diane and Tony's biological daughter. Tegan, Ziggy and her family visit her aunt's cabin, where Tegan and Ziggy eat soup containing magic mushrooms. Ziggy confesses his love for Tegan, but she rejects him due to her cancer treatment. Tegan's condition deteriorates and she requires a bone marrow transplant. Tegan cannot find a match and refuses to reveal that Dee Dee is her biological daughter. After pressure from Celine and Sinead O'Connor's (Stephanie Davis), Tegan tells Tony and Diane the truth; Tony gives consent for Dee Dee to donate bone marrow. Tegan survives her treatment.

Leela and Ziggy later plan to marry, but Ziggy confesses his love for Tegan again. As she goes to tell Leela, she discovers that Diane is planning to gain full custody of Rose and Dee Dee. Tegan and Diane agree to keep their daughters, and Tegan is upset when Leela and Ziggy marry. Tony tries to gain more access to Rose by faking romantic feelings for Tegan, but Tegan discovers this and plans to run away with Rose with Scott Drinkwell's (Ross Adams) help. Tegan pretends that Rose has been kidnapped, but is arrested when Ziggy informs the police of the plan; she is charged with perverting the course of justice and sentenced to four weeks imprisonment. Leela discovers that Tegan and Ziggy were planning to run away with Rose so hands Rose to her biological parents. Ziggy visits Tegan in prison and she vows revenge on him and Leela for their actions. Tegan is released and tries to see Rose, but Diane denies her access. Tegan reveals to Diane that Scott helped her in the kidnapping; they physically fight, but then try to remain civil. Diane bans Tegan from seeing Rose after suspecting her of poisoning her. When Tegan does visit her, Rose cannot recognise her mother, upsetting Tegan.

Cameron is exposed as a serial killer and the murderer of Sam and Danny; when Tegan learns that Leela knew about this, she disowns her. Tegan and Ziggy plan to leave, but Leela reveals that she is pregnant with Ziggy's child. Shortly afterwards, Tegan learns that Leela is lying, but Leela asks Tegan not to tell Ziggy as she does not want to lose him. Leela soon admits the truth to Ziggy and he tells Tegan that they cannot have a future together. At Diane and Tony's wedding, Tegan gives a speech about her love for Rose and Dee Dee and tells Diane that she has torn her family apart. Diane agrees to return Rose to Tegan as she agrees that they cannot continue in their current position. Tegan and Ste attend Cameron's court hearing for Sam and Danny's murder, where Leela reads a positive statement about Cameron; he receives a two-year driving ban. Tegan punches Cameron and leaves for a holiday with Rose. When she returns, she reconciles with Leela and claims to be dating a man named Raphael, which is revealed to be a lie. She goes on a date with Seth (Wilson James), but Ziggy becomes jealous and stops it. Tegan and Ziggy admit their love for each other and almost kiss, but Leela interrupts them. When Leela announces her and Ziggy's intentions to have a baby, Ziggy ends their marriage and confesses his love for Tegan. Leela and Peri leave following the revelation, while Ziggy tries to woo Tegan. When Leela is nearly killed in an explosion, she and Tegan make peace and Leela encourages her to be with Ziggy. Tegan and Ziggy begin a relationship, but as they celebrate, Ziggy dies, leaving Tegan devastated.

In October 2018, Tegan struggles to find Rose during a storm in the village. As she searches for her, a tree falls onto her. Misbah Maalik (Harvey Virdi) performs emergency treatment on Tegan, but when she arrives at hospital, Tegan is told that she needs an operation because of internal bleeding caused by a ruptured spleen as result of the treatment given to her by Misbah. She does not tell anyone about her critical condition, but says goodbye to Rose, Dee Dee, Leela, Ste and Peri. Diane and Tony tell Tegan she can help co-parent Rose and Dee Dee, delighting her, saying it was all she ever wanted. Tegan then goes into cardiac arrest and after attempted resuscitation, she dies, devastating her family.

== Ro Hutchinson ==
Ro Hutchinson
- Hollyoaks character
- Portrayed by: Mia-Rae (2013–2017); Mollie Doherty (2014); Isla Pritchard (2017–2023); Ava Webster (2023–2025); Leo Cole (2025–present)
- Duration: 2013–2020, 2023–present
- First appearance: Episode 3718; 23 October 2013
- Created by: Bryan Kirkwood
In-universe information
- Other names: Rose Lomax
- Occupation: Student
- Father: Tony Hutchinson
- Mother: Diane Hutchinson
- Adoptive father: Fraser Black
- Adoptive mother: Tegan Lomax
- Brothers: Anthony Hutchinson
- Sisters: Dee Dee Hutchinson (adoptive)
- Half-brothers: Harry Thompson; Beau Ramsey; Finn O'Connor (adoptive); Rex Gallagher (adoptive)
- Half-sisters: Grace Hutchinson; Eva Hutchinson; Morgan Osborne; Grace Black (adoptive); Clare Devine (adoptive); Sinead O'Connor (adoptive)
- Grandfathers: Edward Hutchinson; Danny Lomax (adoptive)
- Grandmothers: Victoria Hutchinson; Sam Lomax (adoptive)
- Uncles: Eric Foster; Dom Reilly; Ste Hay (adoptive)
- Aunts: Eva Hutchinson; Verity Hutchinson; Lynette Drinkwell; Babs Drinkwell; Leela Lomax (adoptive)
- Nephews: Rex Gallagher (adoptive)
- Nieces: Katy O'Connor (adoptive); Bella Sharpe (adoptive)
- First cousins: Lily Drinkwell; Scott Drinkwell (adoptive); Peri Lomax (adoptive); Lucas Hay (adoptive); Daniel Lomax (adoptive)

Ro Hutchinson (also Rose Lomax), portrayed by Leo Cole, made his first appearance in episode 3718, originally broadcast on 23 October 2013. Ro is the son of Tony Hutchinson (Nick Pickard) and Diane Hutchinson (Alex Fletcher) but was switched at birth with Dee Dee Hutchinson (Annabelle White/Charlotte White) after Mariam Andrews (Helen Lederer), a midwife whom was drunk on the job, ended up inadvertently switching the babies. Since Tegan's death, Ro has lived with Tony and Diane. For the first five years of his life, he was raised by Tegan.

It was announced on 13 October 2023 in a "new" story for the Hutchinson family, they recast the roles of Ro and Anthony (now William Thompson). The reasoning for so is a "never been done" storyline that Fletcher teased. The recast is a first for many child actors in the soap opera as the production team for Hollyoaks were still attempting to solve the problem of the "disappearing" actors during covid transmissions, who had little to no screen-time.

"This story is gonna be a slow burn, and like I said, I think people are going to really invest in Rose's character, she's just gorgeous and I think when the audience see what she's going to go through, they're going to really feel it with her."

— Alex Fletcher on Ro's recast and upcoming storyline (2023)

On 26 February 2024, it was announced executive producer Hannah Cheers and series producer Angela Abela placed Ro at the forefront of a "groundbreaking" storyline that would oversee Ro exploring his gender identity. Ro quizzes new barmaid Kitty Draper (Iz Hesketh) on her journey on coming out as transgender and the reaction she garnered before admitting to her that he doesn't feel comfortable with his gender. Fletcher, who portrays Ro's on-screen mother Diane, praised the storyline. In scenes from episode 6324, originally broadcast on 5 March 2024, Ro comes out as transgender to Tony and Diane. Tony and Diane are struck by the news; struggling to adjust to Ro's decision. Tony and Diane's "biggest obstacle" were the new pronouns that Ro identifies with, he/him. Tony, still struggling to adjust is advised by Kitty to take Ro to the hairdressers, Tony then makes the first step with Ro. Carter Shepherd (David Ames), the headteacher at Hollyoaks High, contacts Diane and Tony ahead of Ro's return to school – suggesting help that is supporting a struggling Lucas Hay (Oscar Curtis). Carter is a secret conversion therapist trying to convert Ro by suggesting he returns to his former name Rose and to "act" like his birth gender. Clashing with Carter was already foreshadowed in the spring trailer for 2024. In a heated showdown, Ro hit Carter for his transphobic suggestions. Ro starts a friendship with Mercedes McQueen (Jennifer Metcalfe) and Mercedes gives Ro a hat of Bobby Costello (Jayden Fox)'s. Tony then continues to support Ro and takes Ro to shop for clothes that fits his identity – Diane is unhappy. Ro overheard Kitty confess to Freddie Roscoe (Charlie Clapham) about escaping her conversion therapist father Declan Hawthorne (Alan Turkington), who is working with Carter. Ro later has a heated confrontation with Declan, confronting him for his beliefs. Ro is almost attacked but is caught in time by Freddie to run. Carter is later exposed at the Pride festival that Tony and Ro attend which later leads to his arrest. The village then deals with the fall-out from Pride. Realising how impactful and influential Carter's words were, Diane and Ro finally have a breakthrough – Diane ensures Ro she accepts him and loves him unconditionally.

For their role as Ro, Webster was longlisted for "Best Young Performer" at the 2024 Inside Soap Awards.

== Anthony Hutchinson ==
Anthony Hutchinson
- Hollyoaks character
- Portrayed by: Alfie Haughton (2014–2017); Caelan Cobbledick-Manning (2017–2023); William Thompson (2023–2025); Brook Debio (2025–present)
- Duration: 2013–2020, 2023–present
- First appearance: Episode 3718; 23 October 2013
- Created by: Bryan Kirkwood
In-universe information
- Father: Tony Hutchinson
- Mother: Diane Hutchinson
- Brothers: Ro Hutchinson
- Sisters: Dee Dee Hutchinson (adoptive)
- Half-brothers: Harry Thompson; Beau Ramsey
- Half-sisters: Grace Hutchinson; Eva Hutchinson; Morgan Osborne
- Children: Unborn baby
- Grandfathers: Edward Hutchinson
- Grandmothers: Victoria Hutchinson
- Uncles: Eric Foster; Dom Reilly (adoptive)
- Aunts: Eva Hutchinson; Verity Hutchinson; Lynette Drinkwell; Babs Drinkwell
- First cousins: Lily Drinkwell; Scott Drinkwell (adoptive)

Anthony "Ant" Hutchinson, portrayed by Brook Debio, made his first appearance in episode 3718, originally broadcast on 23 October 2013. Anthony is the son of Tony (Nick Pickard) and Diane Hutchinson (Alex Fletcher), the twin brother of Ro Hutchinson (Ava Webster), the half-brother of Harry Thompson (Parry Glasspool), and Grace and Eva Hutchinson, and the adoptive brother of Dee Dee Hutchinson (Lacey Findlow). It was later revealed that Tegan Lomax (Jessica Ellis) is the biological mother of Dee Dee, whilst Diane was the biological mother of Tegan's daughter Rose. This was the result of the midwife, Mariam Andrews (Helen Lederer), mixing up the babies as she was drunk.

It was announced on 13 October 2023 in a "new" story for the Hutchinson family, they recast the roles of Anthony and Ro (now Ava Webster). The reasoning for so is a "never been done" storyline that Fletcher teased. The recast is a first for many child actors in the soap opera as the production team for Hollyoaks were still attempting to solve the problem of the "disappearing" actors during covid transmissions, who had little to no screen-time.

In October 2025, it was confirmed that Ant had been recast alongside his brother Ro and sister Dee Dee, with Brook Debio taking over the role from Thompson.

In 2026, he would lose his mum and experience love with Kathleen-Angel McQueen. Which would lead to a hidden pregnancy, currently unknown to him.

== Dee Dee Hutchinson ==
Dee Dee Hutchinson
- Hollyoaks character
- Portrayed by: Annabelle & Charlotte White (2013–2016); Lily Harrington (2015); Lacey Findlow (2017–2025); Chloe Atkinson (2025–present)
- Duration: 2013–2020, 2023–present
- First appearance: Episode 3718; 23 October 2013
- Created by: Bryan Kirkwood
In-universe information
- Father: Fraser Black
- Mother: Tegan Lomax
- Adoptive father: Tony Hutchinson
- Adoptive mother: Diane Hutchinson
- Stepmother: Sandy Roscoe
- Brothers: Anthony Hutchinson (adoptive); Ro Hutchinson (adoptive)
- Half-brothers: Rex Gallagher; Harry Thompson (adoptive); Beau Ramsey (adoptive); Finn O'Connor (adoptive)
- Half-sisters: Grace Black; Clare Devine; Grace Hutchinson (adoptive); Eva Hutchinson (adoptive); Morgan Osborne (adoptive)
- Grandfathers: Froggy Black; Danny Lomax; Edward Hutchinson (adoptive)
- Grandmothers: Sam Lomax; Victoria Hutchinson (adoptive)
- Uncles: Ste Hay; Sully Sullivan; Eric Foster (adoptive); Dominic Reilly (adoptive)
- Aunts: Leela Lomax; Eva Hutchinson (adoptive); Verity Hutchinson (adoptive); Lynette Drinkwell (adoptive); Babs Drinkwell (adoptive)
- Nephews: Rex Gallagher; Curtis Royle
- Nieces: Tori Devine-Banks (adoptive); Katy O'Connor (adoptive); Hannah Hay-O'Connor (adoptive)
- First cousins: Peri Lomax; Daniel Lomax; Noah Dexter; Clara Dexter; Lucas Hay; Hannah Hay-O'Connor; Leah Barnes (adoptive); Lily Drinkwell (adoptive); Scott Drinkwell (adoptive)
- Other relatives: Steph Cunningham-Lomax

Dee Dee Hutchinson, portrayed by Lacey Findlow, made her first appearance in episode 3718, originally broadcast on 23 October 2013. Dee Dee is the biological daughter of Fraser Black (Jesse Birdsall) and Tegan Lomax (Jessica Ellis), the adoptive daughter of Tony (Nick Pickard) and Diane Hutchinson (Alex Fletcher), the half-sister of Grace Black (Tamara Wall) and Clare Devine (Gemma Bissix) and half sister and aunt of Rex Gallagher (Jonny Labey), the adoptive sister of Anthony (William Thompson) and Ro Hutchinson (Ava Webster), and the adoptive half-sister of Beau Ramsey (Jon-Paul Bell), Harry Thompson (Parry Glasspool). She is also the adoptive half sister and adoptive niece of Eva Hutchinson. She was switched at birth with Rose Lomax, by the nurse Mariam Andrews (Helen Lederer). However, the mothers of the switched babies, Diane and Tegan, agreed to continue raising the children they had been raising.

== Leela Lomax ==
Leela Lomax
- Hollyoaks character
- Portrayed by: Kirsty-Leigh Porter
- Duration: 2013–present
- First appearance: Episode 3719; 24 October 2013
- Introduced by: Bryan Kirkwood
- Spin-off appearances: Hollyoaks Later (2020)
- Crossover appearances: Brookside (2025)
In-universe information
- Other names: Leela Roscoe; Leela Campbell; Leela Dexter
- Occupation: Firefighter; Cleaner
- Father: Danny Lomax
- Mother: Sam Lomax
- Sisters: Tegan Lomax
- Half-brothers: Ste Hay
- Husband: Ziggy Roscoe (2015); Cameron Campbell (2016–2017); Joel Dexter (2024–2027)
- Sons: Daniel Lomax; Noah Dexter
- Daughters: Peri Lomax; Clara Dexter
- Adoptive sons: Sid Sumner (foster)
- Granddaughters: Steph Cunningham-Lomax
- Nephews: Lucas Hay; Ro Hutchinson (adoptive)
- Nieces: Leah Barnes (adoptive); Dee Dee Hutchinson; Hannah Hay-O'Connor
- First cousins: Angela Brown

Leela Dexter (also Lomax , Campbell and Roscoe), played by Kirsty-Leigh Porter, made Her first appearance on 24 October 2013. Leela was an longest-serving member of the Lomax family consisting of Danny (Stephen Billington), Sam (Lizzie Roper) and sisters Peri (Ruby O'Donnell) and Tegan Lomax (Jessica Ellis). Former Emmerdale actress Porter's casting was announced in June 2013, three months prior to the announcement of her character. Executive producer Bryan Kirkwood said that Porter was "a terrific signing for Hollyoaks. She will join us later on in the year in a very exciting role. She is certainly set to mix things up for one of our much-loved characters." Kirkwood later revealed that he intended on introducing sisters of the established character Ste Hay (Kieron Richardson). He wanted to introduce female characters to benefit Hollyoaks' future and revealed his excitement to watch the sisters interact with Ste. In August 2013, it was announced that Porter would be playing one of Ste's sisters. Leela was named after the Doctor Who character Leela, in honour of its 50th anniversary in November 2013. Leela temporarily departed the serial in early 2019, following the death of Porter's daughter. She returned in April 2019. Porter took a break in 2020 to take maternity leave. She departed on 8 October 2020 and returned briefly from 28 to 30 December 2020. She returned on 27 October 2021.

In scenes from episode 6250, originally broadcast on 22 November 2023, it was revealed that Joel and Leela had conceived. She initially did not want to keep the baby as at the time they had recently fallen out over the return of Joel's ex-fiancée Cleo McQueen (Nadine Mulkerrin). Leela lied about an engagement to Cleo. On 21 May 2024, it was announced that Leela would go through a baby tragedy as scenes broadcast later in the month would show her experience baby loss. The storyline was partly replicated from Porter's own baby-loss experience from December 2018. Porter praised the storyline, claiming she was "not the same Kirsty" since losing her daughter Penny-Leigh. She also added she hoped it would "save a life". It was further reported that the loss would happen hours after her wedding to Joel. Porter appeared on ITV daytime talk show Loose Women to spread awareness on the topic and spoke out on her role in the storyline. She mentioned her own experience and reaction when she found out she had lost her own child, saying she had her "breath and soul sucked out" of her. She added: "it's not something you will ever get over" and the silence when they‘be given you the news is deafening. The scenes aired in episode 6382, originally broadcast on 24 May 2024. The scenes were branded "devastating", displaying usual chat with nurses about parenthood – the nurse required a second opinion before admitting Leela had lost her baby. The episode then featured silent credits to signify the loss. Douglas-Speed praised the plot and Porter's portrayal.

"She came to the decision it would be healing for her, and a chance to speak to the community who have been through this, I'm so glad she had the confidence and bravery to do the storyline. Kirsty gives the performance of a lifetime - she is a powerhouse."

— Rory Douglas-Speed on Porter's portrayal on the tragic baby loss (2024)

The scenes of Leela being induced and in labour were broadcast in episode 6384, transmitted on 28 May 2024. Leela, along with Joel named the baby Noah. The episode also featured a tribute to Porter's own daughter, with an inscription reading "In memory of Penny-Leigh Barber, 21.12.2018". ITV later interviewed both of them on the storyline, with Porter expressing her concern about their being a "taboo" of baby loss and she wanted to break it by portraying the storyline, adding if anybody would have told the story, it would have been her.. During the 30th Anniversary celebrations Leela among mostly all of the Hollyoaks cast appeared in the epispde airing 22 October which saw Hollyoak crossover with former Channel 4 soap Brookside.

=== Storylines ===
Leela arrives to visit Tegan after she gives birth to a surprise baby. She agrees to move in with her parents and meets her half-brother Ste. In trying to help Sienna Blake (Anna Passey) to find her daughter, Leela revealed that Peri was not her sister but her daughter. She admits that she gave birth young and her parents agreed to be parents to her. She finally tells Peri that she is her mother and Peri rejects her. Leela's ex Cameron Campbell (Cameron Moore) arrives in Hollyoaks and tries to win her back, but at the time she was with Ziggy Roscoe (Fabrizio Santino). In 2015, Leela married Ziggy. Peri becomes pregnant at 15 by Tom Cunningham (Ellis Hollins), and later gives birth to a baby girl called Steph, making Leela a grandmother at 28. Ziggy dies on Christmas Eve 2015 after suffering a head injury in an explosion a day before leaving Leela heartbroken. Leela later falls pregnant. Leela is horrified when Peri goes missing and it is revealed that Nico kept her hostage in a bunker. Peri reveals this to them at the hospital and a furious Cameron vows revenge. He starts a fire which kills Nico but it also kills Ziggy's brother Joe Roscoe (Ayden Callaghan), after an explosion causes him to fall from a ferris wheel. A few weeks later, Cameron proposes to Leela and she happily accepts. Celine McQueen (Sarah George) discovers that Cameron started the fire so Cameron kills her to keep his secret. At Leela's hen party, Tegan pays Zack Loveday (Duayne Boachie) to be the stripper and an angry Cameron punches him. The guilt of Cameron's crimes becomes too much for him, so he writes a confession letter and leaves. Leela panics when he disappears so his cousin Courtney Campbell (Amy Conacham) tricks him into meeting her at the hospital. He tries to confess his crimes but Courtney persuades him to return to Leela. Leela finds his confession letter but only reads the first page before rushing off to the ceremony and Cameron burns it. After saying their vows, Leela goes into labour two months early. She gives birth to a baby boy but the baby is struggling to breathe. Cameron spots a bruise on the baby's leg and angrily accuses the staff of harming his child. Leela names the baby Daniel after her father. While they are alone, Tegan tells Leela that it was a Mongolian blue spot which is common in mixed race babies, meaning Cameron isn't the father. Leela tells Cameron that he isn't the father and he makes her choose between him or the baby and Leela chooses him. The baby's father is revealed to be Louis Loveday (Karl Collins) whose son Zack was the main suspect.

Leela is horrified when she discovers that Nico tried to kill Peri and Harley and goes to find her. She goes to Sienna's flat and walks in on Nico attacking Sienna so she pulls Nico of Sienna, but accidentally pushes her against a table. Believing Nico to be dead, Leela apologises to Sienna but Nico wakes up and pushes Leela before trying to kill Sienna with a glass vase. Sienna picks up a doorstep and hits Nico with it, killing her.

=== Reception ===
In August 2017, the revelation that Louis is the father of Leela's son, Daniel was longlisted for Best Shock Twist at the Inside Soap Awards. The nomination did not progress to the viewer-voted shortlist. The scene of Leela losing her third baby with Joel was branded "devastating". In 2024, Daniel Kilkelly from Digital Spy speculated that Leela's love triangle with Cleo and Joel would be "another big plot", explaining, "All three characters provide a likeable and warm presence in the show, so fans are likely to be torn over which way they want this one to go".

== Grace Black ==
Grace Black, played by Tamara Wall, made her first appearance on 8 November 2013. Wall's character and casting was announced on 24 October 2013. Grace is the sister of Clare Devine (Gemma Bissix) and daughter of Fraser Black (Jesse Birdsall). Daniel Kilkelly from Digital Spy also warned that viewers could expect an "interesting dynamic" between Grace and Fraser's employee Trevor Royle (Greg Wood). Describing Grace, Kilkelly was told that "considering her relations, I don't think she's going to be the nicest of characters."

== Ray McCormick ==
Ray McCormick, played by Cristian Solimeno, made his first appearance on 28 November 2013. A writer from SoapSquawk revealed that Ray's arrival would create problems for Fraser Black (Jesse Birdsall). The two are enemies who have previously clashed. Solimeno's initial episodes Ray will air from November with more frequent appearances in December. Ray returned in 2014 and Fraser lied to Trevor Royle (Greg Wood), saying that Ray had killed his father. However, it was Fraser who had killed his father. Ray was later believed to have been murdered by Grace Black (Tamara Wall). However, she may have paid him off in order for him to leave the village for good.

== Other characters ==
Character	Date(s)	Actor	Circumstances
Penny	2 January	Debra Stewart	Penny is a social worker who visits the Osborne family following an accident involving Charlie Dean (Charlie Behan).
Police Officer	8 January	Martin Walsh	A police officer who investigates Esther Bloom (Jazmine Franks) claims that Bart McQueen (Jonny Clarke) drove while intoxicated and was responsible for causing a bus crash that killed four people in November 2012.
Doctor	14 January	Blue Merrick	A doctor who treats Will Savage (James Atherton) when he falls down a flight of stairs and informs Will's family of his condition.
Doctor Singer	21 January	Dominic Gately	A doctor who treats Esther Bloom (Jazmine Franks) following her attempted suicide.
John Davies	22–27 January	Roderic Culver	John Davies is a Doctor who works at Dee Valley Hospital as a consultant and is the boss of Dr. Paul Browning (Joseph Thompson). When Doctor Browning lies to Myra McQueen (Nicole Barber-Lane) that she is terminally ill, Myra attempts to prosecute the hospital. Doctor Browning and his fiancée Mercedes McQueen (Jennifer Metcalfe) host a dinner party to win Davies' favour. Davies has the investigation overthrown on the condition Mercedes has sex with him. Doctor Browning does not agree to Davies condition so he threatens to report him for faking Myra's test results. Doctor Browning tells Mercedes who confronts Davies, slapping him. Davies tells her that Doctor Browning would lose his job and possibly go to prison if he was exposed and Mercedes agrees to his requests. Phoebe McQueen (Mandip Gill) sees Davies with Mercedes and warns her that he is dangerous. She ignores Phoebe's warnings and leaves in a taxi with him so Phoebe tells Doctor Browning that they have gone to a hotel. At the hotel Mercedes hides a camera to try to blackmail Davies but he discovers the camera and confronts her. Doctor Browning arrives and hits Davies, telling him that he can not reveal Doctor Browning's lies or Doctor Browning will show his wife the footage of him kissing Mercedes.
Doctor Daley	22–23 January	Donna Berlin	A doctor who informs Esther Bloom's (Jazmine Franks) family that, following her attempted suicide, she will need a liver transplant or she will die. She later tells Esther about the complications she will face in her life if she does live.
Police Officer Sandra	1 February	Fiona Clarke	Sandra is a police officer who lets Nana McQueen (Diane Langton) and Myra McQueen (Nicole Barber-Lane) out of their holding cell after Nana complains about feeling ill. Sandra lets the rest out individually to give their statements.
Consultant	4–5 February	Jane Jeffrey	A consultant who tells Jack Osborne (Jimmy McKenna) and Frankie Osborne (Helen Pearson) that Esther Bloom's (Jazmine Franks) condition has worsened She later tells Jack that the liver Esther needs has been delayed. She later told Frankie that would be soon be preparing Esther for the liver transplant. She then tells the Osbornes that she is happy with Esther to have the transplant.
Doctor	7 February	Denver Issac	A doctor who treats Ruby Button (Anna Shaffer) after she is run over by Jack Osborne (Jimmy McKenna).
Tyson	8 February	Tristan Temple	Tristan is a male stripper who Mitzeee (Rachel Shenton) believes is the father of her child, he, however, refuses to help her.
Hitman	13 February	Delroy Brown	A hitman who Mitzeee (Rachel Shenton) visits to arrange the murder of Walker (Neil Newbon), she calls him off after meeting him.
Eamonn Holmes	14 February	Himself	Eamonn Holmes appeared in Hollyoaks on 14 February 2013. The Sky News presenter publicised his involvement in the show on 17 December 2012. He tweeted a thank you message to Rachel Shenton, who plays Mitzeee. A picture of the pair revealed that Mitzeee was appearing on Holmes' Sunrise programme. The scenes were filmed as part of Shenton's exit from Hollyoaks.
Nurse	14 February	Faye Elvin	A nurse who performs Mitzeee's (Rachel Shenton) ultrasound scan.
Cressida	1–13 March	Brigit Forsyth	Cheryl Brady (Bronagh Waugh) suspects that her boyfriend Nate Tenbury-Newent (Tom Turner) is having an affair. She follows him to a house and barges in expecting to find another woman. Nate introduces Cheryl to the woman, who is actually his mother, Cressida. She goes to Cheryl's for tea, but ends up criticising Nate. Cheryl shouts at Cressida and urges Nate to stand up to his mother. Cressida later visits again to apologise and tell Nate that he can have the family estate.
D.I Bulmer	9 May – 27 June	Daymon Britton	D.I Bulmer is a detective investigating the murder of Texas Longford (Bianca Hendrickse-Spendlove).
D.I Johnson	16 May	Una McNulty	D.I Johnson arrests Mercedes McQueen (Jennifer Metcalfe), Carmel Valentine (Gemma Merna) and Dr. Paul Browning (Joseph Thompson) after finding drugs in Chez Chez.
Katy O'Connor	22 May – 31 March 2014	Uncredited	Sinead O'Connor's (Stephanie Davis) daughter with the deceased Rhys Ashworth (Andrew Moss). She was born in the back of a burnt out car on 22 May 2013 but she dies from an undiagnosed heart problem on 1 April 2014.
Mrs Rahj	25–31 July	Jamila Massey	Mrs Rahj first appears in hospital where she annoys Pauline Hay (Julie Hogarth) as she becomes upset over her long-lost granddaughter. Dr. Paul Browning (Joseph Thompson) begins to tire of Mrs Rahj until she reveals that her deceased husband was a millionaire. Doctor Browning convinces Phoebe McQueen (Mandip Gill) to pose as her granddaughter and she believes her. Mrs Rahj gives Phoebe an expensive bracelet which makes her feel guilty. Phoebe lies to Doctor Browning that Mrs Rahj does not have much money so he will leave her alone.
Punter	26 July	Matthew Booth	Sinead O'Connor (Stephanie Davis) arranges to meet the punter for sex in her flat. However, Sinead changes her plans and asks Ruby Button (Anna Shaffer) to babysit. The punter arrives and Ruby fears that he will assault her.
Norman Wright	30 July	Richard Cunningham	Sinead O'Connor (Stephanie Davis) arranges to meet the Norman for sex in her flat. He does not realise that Ste Hay (Kieron Richardson) is watching them and he takes photographs. The duo blackmail Norman and he hands over five thousand pounds.
Don Trent	9–10 September 2013	Stephen Bent	Don is Richie Trent's father.
Henry Forrester	5 November	Adrian Grove	Henry Forrester arrives to inform Will Savage (James Atherton) that his mother has left him a mansion in her will.
Bella Sharpe	5–7 November 2013, 25–27 August 2014	Imaani Byndloss	Bella is Amber Sharpe (Lauren Gabrielle-Thomas) and Finn O'Connor's (Keith Rice) daughter. In early-November 2013, Finn goes to see Bella. Dale (Dominic Ridley) orders him to leave but Robbie Roscoe (Charlie Wernham) tells Dale to stay away from Bella. In August 2014, Amber and Bella briefly return for three episodes, revolving around Finn.
Dale	5–7 November	Dominic Ridley	Dale is looking after Bella Sharpe (Imaani Byndloss) when her biological father Finn O'Connor (Keith Rice) arrives to see her. He wants Finn to keep away but Robbie Roscoe (Charlie Wernham) punches him and tells him to back off.
Superintendent Marlow	15 November 2013 – 21 April 2014	Paul Clayton	Marlow is a corrupt police officer who gets involved with criminal Fraser Black (Jesse Birdsall). Fraser gets him on side. He returns in 2014 and in April, Fraser forces Ste Hay (Kieron Richardson) to take the blame for crashing into Sinead O'Connor's (Stephanie Davis) car and killing a policeman. However, it transpires that Fraser is the culprit and Ste begs Marlow to tell Fraser that it wasn't his fault that this information came out. Sam Lomax (Lizzie Roper) and Sonny Valentine (Aaron Fontaine) overhear and he gets fired from his police job. He is later murdered by Fraser.
