= Jessica Ellis =

British actress (born 1987)

- Ellis in 2015
- Born: 22 March 1987 (age 39)
- Occupations: Actress; Podcast host Presenter
- Years active: 1988, 2010–
- Television: Hollyoaks

Jessica Ellis (born 22 March 1987) is a British actress and presenter. Ellis is from Liverpool and has also lived in London. After first appearing in a television film as a baby, Ellis went to theatre school and in 2011 she had guest roles in the BBC soap operas EastEnders and Doctors. Ellis received praise for her acting in the 2012 plays Bedroom Farce and Happy Never After. In 2013, Ellis was cast as Tegan Lomax in the soap opera Hollyoaks and she remained in the soap until her character was killed off in 2018. In 2019, Ellis launched her own podcast and began presenting The Guide Liverpool website, and she returned to theatre in plays such as Rita, Sue & Bob Too! (2022, 2025), The Book of Will (2023) and Pride and Prejudice (2025), as well as the Interactive live stream pantomime Cinderella Live (2020). She was also cast in Fat Friends The Musical, but this was postponed due to the COVID-19 pandemic in the United Kingdom. The actress has also had guest appearances in The Bay (2023) and Coronation Street (2025), as well as a minor role in the medieval comedy film Catherine Called Birdy (2022).

== Life and career ==
Jessica Ellis was born on 22 March 1987 and is an only child. Ellis is from South Reddish, Stockport. Ellis' mother worked as a teaching assistant at St. Joseph's RC Primary school in Reddish and Ellis herself has worked in special education schools. Ellis' first acting role came in 1988, where she appeared as a baby in the TV movie Double Standard. Ellis went to theatre school. Ellis lived in London for eight years prior to 2013 and said that she was really in the "theatre scene" there. In between acting jobs, Ellis has worked as a nanny. In 2021, Ellis said that her agent was Guy Howe from WGM Atlantic Talent & Literary Group. Ellis is also part of Off Limits Entertainment.

In 2010, Ellis appeared in the play Defined By Design at The Old Vic theatre. Ellis then appeared in two episodes, which were broadcast on 23 and 25 August 2011, of the BBC soap opera EastEnders as Debs, and that same year she appeared in an episode of Doctors. Ellis then portrayed Kate in Theatre by the Lake's production of Bedroom Farce, which ran from May to November 2012. David Chadderton from British Theatre Guide opined that Ellis gave a "great performance" in the production. Anne Hopper from The Stage was impressed with Ellis' "fine performance" and believed that she had "exactly the right blend of warm-hearted enthusiasm". Also in 2012, Ellis acted in the two-hander play Happy Never After at the Pleasance Theatre. Miriam Zendle from WhatsOnStage.com praised Ellis' performance and called it a "five star play in every respect".

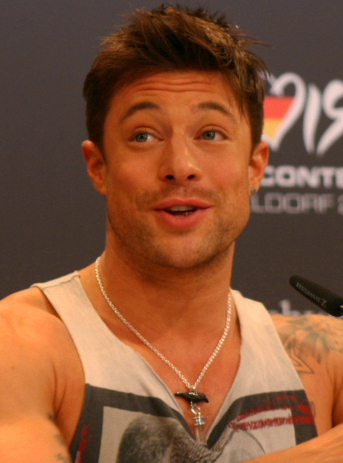
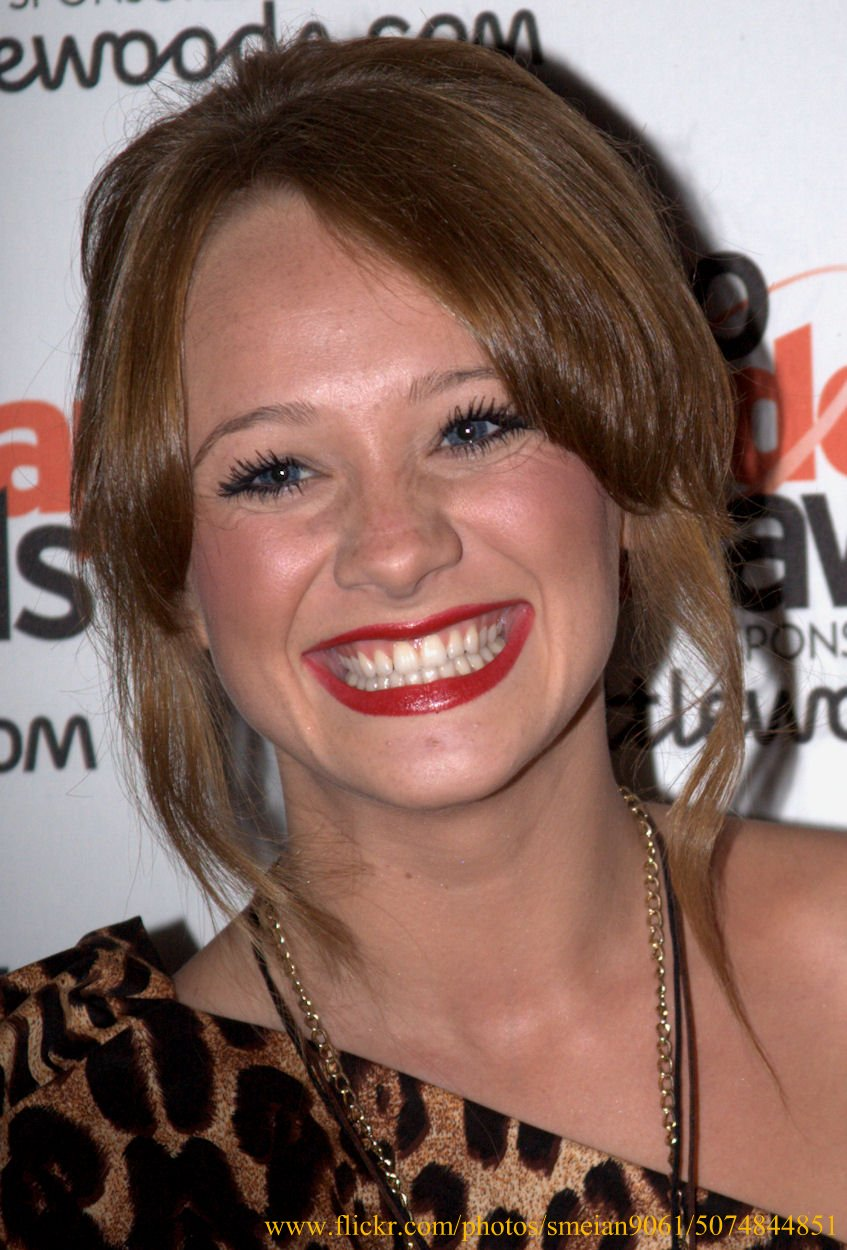
Ellis became friends with her Hollyoaks co-stars Duncan James (left) and Kirsty-Leigh Porter (right).

In September 2013, it was announced that Ellis had joined the cast of the Channel 4 soap opera Hollyoaks as Tegan Lomax. Tegan and her two sisters Leela (Kirsty-Leigh Porter) and Peri Lomax (Ruby O'Donnell) were introduced to the soap by executive producer Bryan Kirkwood, who wanted to bring in a "strong female force" and a family for the sisters' half-brother Ste Hay (Kieran Richardson). Ellis' debut aired on 23 October 2013; Tegan's first episode involved a "shocking twist" which saw the character give birth, having not known that she was pregnant. During Ellis' run on the soap, Tegan's other storylines included the death of her parents, finding out that her baby was swapped at birth, a love triangle with Leela and Ziggy Roscoe (Fabrizio Santino), getting diagnosed with cancer, an affair with Nick Savage (Ben-Ryan Davies) and a relationship with Ryan Knight (Duncan James). Ellis felt Tegan's cancer storyline, which she did research for, would help raise awareness and so she wanted to "make it as real as possible". In 2015, Ellis appeared in Hollyoaks Does Come Dine with Me, a spinoff of Come Dine with Me, with other Hollyoaks cast members.

Ellis' last appearance as Tegan on Hollyoaks aired in October 2018, when the character was killed off in a storm. Ellis was sad about her exit but expressed excitement about the "next chapter" of her career. Ellis explained that she would miss working with her co-stars as they had become good friends and she considered them family and that there were a lot of "genuine tears" when she was filming her exit scenes. Ellis added that she would also miss the crew, including the canteen staff, and that she had grown up on the soap, adding, "It has become part of my everyday life". Ellis had known that Tegan would be killed off for six months but had to keep it a secret, although her family knew. Ellis' parents came onto the set to watch her final scenes. Ellis found the support from fans overwhelming and told Digital Spy, "It was really emotional for me. Five years is a long time". The actress also said that she would be open to being in another soap opera. Tegan's death came in fourth place, with 9.7% of the total votes, for "Most devastating Soap Death" at the 2018 Digital Spy Reader Awards.

In November 2018, it was announced that Ellis had secured a new job as a presenter for The Guide Liverpool, a website showcasing events in the city. In 2019, Ellis launched her own podcast called Dilemmas, where she and guests listened and gave solutions to the problems of her listeners. Ellis had worked in radio in the past and loved podcasts, which prompted her to start this project.

In December 2020, Ellis portrayed the Evil Stepmother in Cinderella Live, an interactive live stream pantomime. In October 2021, Ellis announced that she had joined the cast of Fat Friends The Musical, which was going on a UK tour. Several of Ellis' cast members in the musical had also worked in soap operas. The play was meant to tour across the UK and Ireland beginning in January 2022. However, the production was later postponed due to the COVID-19 pandemic in the United Kingdom. In 2022, Ellis portrayed Michelle in Rita, Sue & Bob Too!, a stage adaptation of the 1987 film, at the St Helens Theatre Royal. Ellis returned to the role in 2025, when the production did a 10-week nationwide tour. That same year, Ellis appeared in the medieval comedy film Catherine Called Birdy, which Ellis was excited to be in.

In 2023, Ellis starred as Alice Heminges/Susannah Shakespeare in the European premiere of Lauren Gunderson's The Book of Will, which was performed at various theatre throughout 2023, including Queen's Theatre, Hornchurch and Shakespeare North Playhouse. Ellis worked with her former Hollyoaks co-star Helen Pearson in this production. In 2023, Ellis also appeared in the British crime drama The Bay. In January 2025, it was reported that Ellis had joined the cast of ITV soap opera Coronation Street as Brie Benson, an inmate who would antagonise established character Lauren Bolton (Cait Fitton) in prison. It was revealed that Ellis' stint would last for a few episodes which aired that same month. That same year, it was announced that Ellis been cast as Lydia Bennet/ Lady Catherine de Bourgh in Kate Hamill's stage adaptation of Pride and Prejudice, which is set to be performed at five theatres across Britain between June and October 2025.

== Personal life ==
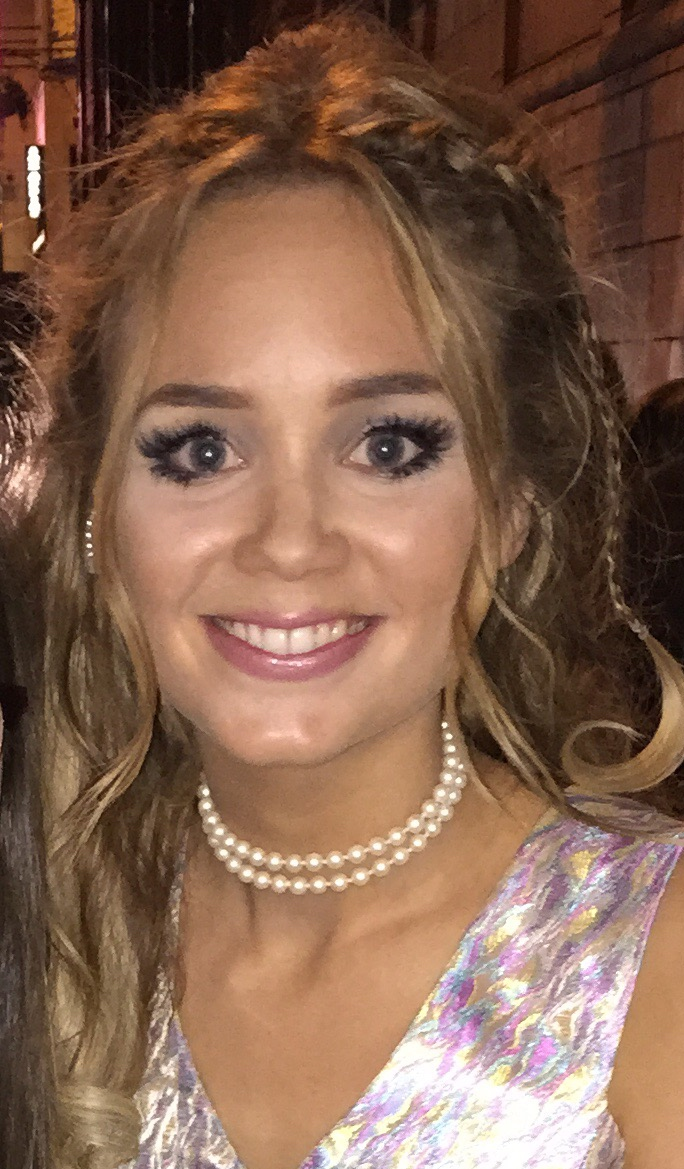
Ellis is close friends with actress Daisy Wood-Davis.

Ellis said in 2018 that she is close friends with her Hollyoaks co-star Daisy Wood-Davis, who plays Kim Butterfield; the pair went on holiday together and saw each other "pretty much every day" outside of work. Ellis is also friends with actress Kimberly Hart-Simpson; the pair met when they were 19 at theatre school and were cast in productions together as a "double act". She made an awards dress for Ellis in 2018, which Simpson said got much coverage due to Ellis looking like "the lead character in Joseph and the Amazing Technicolor Dreamcoat." Simpson and Ellis worked together in Cinderella Live in 2020. Ellis has also said that she has a phobia of ears.

In May 2021, Ellis announced on Instagram that she was engaged after her partner Michael Shaw proposed to her. Ellis had told Digital Spy that Shaw was her boyfriend and that they were living together in 2019 and that he would appear in the background of her podcast; Ellis ended up creating a concept called Dilemma Extra – Michael Reviews in her podcast. In June 2023, it was reported that Ellis and Shaw has split up.

== Acting credits ==
=== Filmography ===
Year	Title	Role	Notes	Ref.
1988	Double Standard	—N/a	TV movie	
2011	EastEnders	Debs	Guest role (2 episodes)	
2011	Doctors	Tina Leith	Guest role (1 episode)	
2013–18	Hollyoaks	Tegan Lomax	Regular role	
2015	Hollyoaks Does Come Dine with Me	Herself	Main cast	
2020	Cinderella Live	Evil Stepmother	Interactive live stream pantomime	
2022	Catherine Called Birdy	Laundress	Medieval comedy film	
2023	The Bay	Tina Shaw	Guest role	
2025	Coronation Street	Brie Benson	Guest role	

=== Theatre ===
Year	Production	Role	Ref.
2010	Defined By Design	—N/a	
2012	Bedroom Farce	Kate	
2012	Happy Never After	—N/a	
2022 (Note: The musical was cancelled due to COVID-19 pandemic in the United Kingdom.)	Fat Friends The Musical	Kelly	
2022, 2025	Rita, Sue & Bob Too!	Michelle	
2023	The Book of Will	Alice Heminges/ Susannah Shakespeare	
2025	Pride and Prejudice	Lydia Bennet / Lady Catherine de Bourgh	
