= Fabrizio Santino =

Italian-British actor (born 1982)

- Born: 12 December 1982 (age 43); Italy
- Occupation: Actor
- Notable work: Hollyoaks

Fabrizio Santino (born 12 December 1982) is an Italian-British actor, known for portraying the role of Ziggy Roscoe in the Channel 4 soap opera, Hollyoaks, between 2013 and 2015. In 2023, Santino appeared in the BBC soap opera, EastEnders as Brett Nelson, as well as fellow BBC soap opera Doctors.

== Early life ==
Santino was born in Italy and raised in London.

== Filmography ==
Year	Title	Role	Notes
2010	A Day of Violence	Fabrizio	
2011	Captain America: The First Avenger	Krugers Driver	
2011	Turnout	Lee	
2012	Gangsters, Guns & Zombies	Crazy Steve	
2013–2015	Hollyoaks	Ziggy Roscoe	Regular role; 218 episodes
2016	The Naked Poet	Tommy	
2018	Fragments	James Robins	
2019	It Never Sleeps	Richard	
2023	EastEnders	Brett Nelson	Recurring role
2023	Doctors	Dario Riva	1 episode
TBA	Witch	Marshall	
