= Joseph Thompson (actor) =

British actor

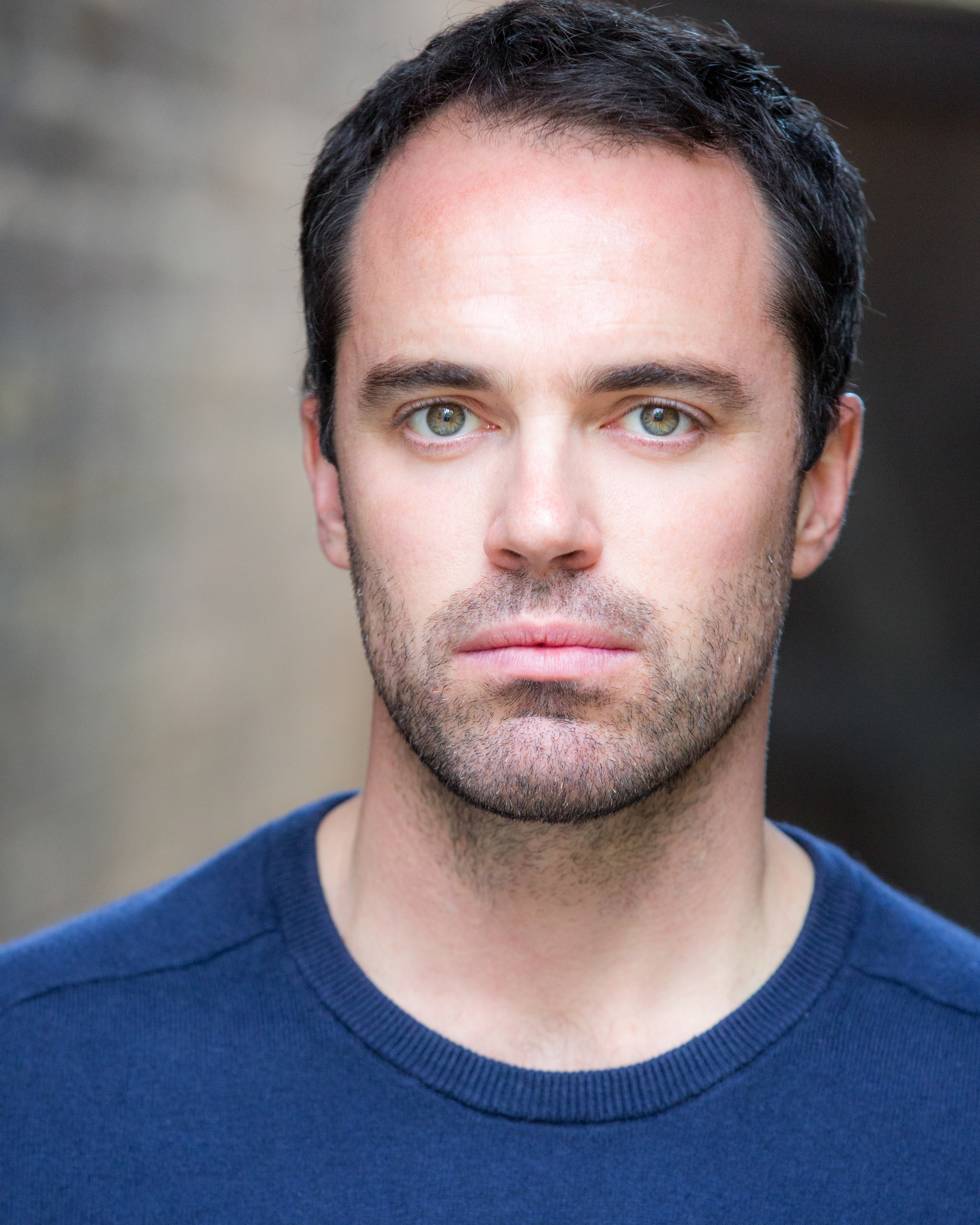
- Thompson in 2015
- Occupation: Actor
- Years active: 2005–present

Joseph Thompson is a British theatre, screen and voice actor from England, best known for playing Dr. Paul Browning in the Channel 4 soap opera Hollyoaks and for voicing Nigel, the helpless tourist searching for his friend Gavin in Rockstar’s Red Dead Redemption 2 video game. He studied at the University of Bristol and trained as an actor at the Webber Douglas Academy of Dramatic Art.

== Career ==
He made his 2005 theatre debut in Romeo and Juliet at the Royal Exchange, Manchester alongside Andrew Garfield and Gugu Mbatha-Raw and has worked extensively on stage. Notable productions include The Voysey Inheritance Fram and The Cherry Orchard at the National Theatre, Petrol Jesus Nightmare #5 at The Traverse Theatre and Earthquakes in London for Headlong. Other television work includes playing Eddie in Falling Water, Preston in Time After Time, George Hastings in the Sky Television adaptation of She Stoops To Conquer and roles in Elementary, Casualty, and EastEnders.

== Awards ==
He won the British Soap Award for Best Newcomer at The British Soap Awards and was nominated in the same category at the National Television Awards in 2013 for his portrayal of Dr. Browning. He was also nominated for Best On-Screen Partnership with Jennifer Metcalfe at the 2014 British Soap Awards.

== Personal life ==
Following his departure from Hollyoaks he moved to New York.
