= Greg Wood (actor) =

English actor (born 1979)

- Born: Gregory Milburn; 21 August 1979 (age 47); Manchester, England
- Occupation: Actor
- Television: Hollyoaks (2000, 2002, 2013–2016); Coronation Street (2003, 2009–2010, 2012, 2019, 2022); Brookside (2002–2003)

Gregory Milburn (born 21 August 1979), better known as Greg Wood, is a British actor from Manchester, England, known for playing characters in Channel 4 soaps such as Trevor Royle in Hollyoaks and Terry Gibson in Brookside. He also played Rick Neelan in ITV soap Coronation Street. He is the brother of fellow actor Matt Milburn, who has also starred in Hollyoaks and Coronation Street.

== Career ==
Wood usually plays villainous or threatening characters. His first acting role was in Hollyoaks, playing one of the bullies in the groundbreaking portrayal of Luke Morgan's rape. He would go on to play possibly his best-known role in Brookside, (as Greg Milburn) drug dealer Terry Gibson. Wood later reprised the role for the spin-off DVD Unfinished Business, and was one of four nominated for Soap Villain of the Year.

Since leaving Brookside, he has appeared in The Courtroom and Casualty 1907, and has appeared twice in Emmerdale.

Wood is the brother of Matt Milburn, who played Joe Spencer in Hollyoaks and footballer Tommy Orpington in Coronation Street.

In 2009, Wood himself joined Coronation Street, in which he played a loan shark, Rick Neelan. On 14 April 2010, Coronation Street was cleared by Ofcom for broadcasting a scene in which Wood's character pushed a burning newspaper through someone's letterbox. Thirty-one people complained about the scene, claiming that the show had incited and encouraged crime. However, Ofcom ruled that it was "not likely to encourage or incite the commission of crime or lead to disorder".

In 2013, Wood rejoined Hollyoaks to play the villainous character Trevor Royle, a pivotal player in the exit of long running character Jacqui McQueen.

== Filmography ==
Year	Show	Role	Notes
2000	Hollyoaks: Breaking Boundaries	Kenneth "Kenny" Boyd	Recurring (as Greg Milburn)
2002	Hollyoaks	Jury Member	Extra (as Greg Milburn)
2002–2003	Brookside	Terry Gibson	Series regular (as Greg Milburn)
2003	Brookside: Unfinished Business	Terry Gibson	Spin off DVD (as Greg Milburn)
2003	Coronation Street	Phil Crane	2 episodes (as Greg Milburn)
2004	The Courtroom	Andrew Aston	1 episode: One in Six (as Greg Milburn)
2006	Emmerdale	Nick Callow	1 episode (as Greg Milburn)
2008	Casualty 1907	Docker	2 episodes (as Greg Milburn)
2009	Emmerdale	Skin	2 episodes
2009–2010, 2012, 2019, 2022	Coronation Street	Rick Neelan	Recurring role, 48 episodes
2013–2016	Hollyoaks	Trevor Royle	Regular role, 308 episodes
2013	Hollyoaks Later	Trevor Royle	1 episode
2018	Casualty	Johnny Fargo	1 episode
2021	Brassic	Barry MacDonagh	8 episodes

== Pennsylvania Shakespeare Festival ==
Wood has also performed in 25 seasons at the Pennsylvania Shakespeare Festival, including:

- Hamlet;
- Richard III;
- Prospero in The Tempest;
- Antony in Antony and Cleopatra;
- Cyrano in Cyrano de Bergerac;
- The Poet in An Iliad; and
- Petruchio in The Taming of the Shrew.
