= Jesse Birdsall =

British actor (born 1963)

- Born: 13 February 1963 (age 63); Highbury, London, England
- Occupation: Actor
- Years active: 1976–present
- Spouse: Gwyneth Strong (m. 2000)
- Children: 2

Jesse Birdsall (born 13 February 1963) is an English actor, known for his roles as Marcus Tandy in the BBC1 soap opera Eldorado (1992–1993), Nick Beckett in the adventure series Bugs (1995–1999), football manager Roger Webb in Footballers' Wives (2003–2006), and Fraser Black in Hollyoaks (2013–2014) as well as for villain Ron Gregory in a few episodes of The Bill.

== Career ==
As a child, Birdsall attended the Anna Scher children's theatre school in Islington, and in his teens appeared in Nanette Newman's children's cooking programme Fun Food Factory and in several television plays and series, usually with his trademark rockabilly look. He had one line as an extra ("Watch it mate!") in an episode of Minder from 1980 entitled "Don't Tell Them Willie Boy was Here". In 1982 he starred alongside singer Hazel O'Connor in the TV drama series set in a nightclub called Jangles. He first came to wider public attention in the serial Annika in 1984, his first notable television role. He then subsequently appeared in the films We'll Support You Evermore (1985), Wish You Were Here (1987), directed by David Leland and co-starring Emily Lloyd, Getting It Right (1989), and Beyond Bedlam (1994). He appeared in the 1988 music video of Kim Wilde's single Hey Mister Heartache.

Another notable television role was his portrayal of slick playboy Marcus Tandy in the BBC1 soap opera Eldorado, which ran for just one year from 1992 to 1993 and came to be thought of as a notable flop. Nonetheless, the amount of coverage the programme received for its perceived low quality and lack of success would gain Birdsall much exposure, and from 1995 to 1999 he played one of the lead characters in another BBC1 programme, the successful futuristic action/adventure series Bugs.

Birdsall played the part of John Barron in the last episode of Inspector Morse in the episode The Remorseful Day which aired on 15 November 2000.

In 2002 he appeared in an episode of Murder in Mind called "Swansong". He appeared in New Tricks as Tony Morgan in season 8 episode 6. He guest-starred in Midsomer Murders in the episodes "Market For Murder" in 2002 as Harry Painter and "Small Mercies" in 2009 as Mike Johnson. He also appeared in several episodes of the ITV police drama The Bill in 2003 as a character named Ron Gregory, and for the same network appeared as a regular in series 3–5 of the popular drama Footballers' Wives.

In 2006, Birdsall appeared as patient Dillon Ellis in two episodes of Holby City before reappearing in 2018 as Steven Fletcher, the estranged father of Adrian Fletcher.

He had a small role in the BBC One soap opera EastEnders in August 2012, playing John Hewland, jilted fiancé of Sharon Watts (Letitia Dean), in two episodes.

Birdsall played the role of Fraser Black in Channel 4 soap Hollyoaks but left the show in spring 2014 following a whodunit storyline in which he was murdered.

== Personal life ==
The son of Penguin Books designer Derek Birdsall, Birdsall attended Hampstead School in north London. He has been married to Only Fools and Horses actress Gwyneth Strong, with whom he has two children, since 15 July 2000.

Birdsall has been in trouble with the police twice: being convicted of actual bodily harm after an altercation in 1981, and being fined £1,000 following an unprovoked attack on a fellow customer at a pub in London in 1999.

Birdsall is a supporter of Arsenal having been born and brought up in the Highbury district.
