= Sophie Austin =

British actress (born 1984)

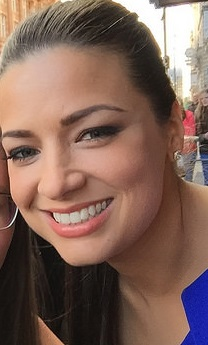
- Born: 5 January 1984 (age 42); London, England
- Occupation: Actress
- Years active: 2000–present
- Spouse: Graeme Rooney (m. 2015–2016)
- Partner(s): Shayne Ward (2016–present; engaged)
- Children: 2

Sophie Austin (born 5 January 1984) is an English actress who started her career out in theatre but later moved to screen. She portrayed Lindsey Butterfield in the British soap opera Hollyoaks, a role she held from June 2013 until May 2016. She also portrayed the wife of footballer Geoff Hurst, Judith, in ITV drama Tina and Bobby. Her work has included roles in Casualty, Moving On and Call the Midwife.

== Personal life ==
In 2015, she married fellow actor Graeme Rooney, but the couple split the following year. In 2016, she began dating singer and Coronation Street actor, Shayne Ward. On 2 August 2016, the couple announced they were expecting their first child. On 2 December 2016, the pair welcomed their first child, a daughter named Willow May. In December 2017, Ward announced his engagement to Austin.

== Filmography ==
Film
Year	Title	Role
2000	Paria	Girl in the Train Station
2009	The Demon Within	Debbie

Television
Year	Title	Role	Notes
2010	Partygirl	Lucy	Television film
2011	EastEnders	Jools	2 episodes
2012	Misfits	Sarah	Guest role
2012	Hollyoaks	Sapphire	1 episode
2013–2016	Hollyoaks	Lindsey Butterfield	Series regular
2016	Casualty	Tanya Duffin	2 episodes
2017	Tina and Bobby	Judith Hurst	Main role
2017	Moving On	Ms. Samfield	Episode: "Two Fat Ladies"
2018	Call the Midwife	Marjory Chivvers	1 episode
2018	Doctors	Katie Barrett	Episode: "A Kind of Justice"
2019	Casualty	Susie	1 episode
2024	Doctors	Sandra Horner	Episode: "Shock Therapy"
