= Courtney Campbell (Hollyoaks) =

Fictional character from Hollyoaks

- Hollyoaks character
- Portrayed by: Amy Conachan
- Duration: 2016–21
- First appearance: 29 August 2016
- Last appearance: 30 June 2021
- Introduced by: Bryan Kirkwood
In-universe information
- Other names: Courtney Donovan
- Occupation: Science teacher Deputy headteacher
- Husband: Jesse Donovan (2020)
- Daughters: Iona Campbell
- Grandmothers: Granny Campbell
- Uncles: Tommy Campbell
- First cousins: Cameron Campbell; Lockie Campbell
- Other relatives: Peri Lomax; Steph Cunningham-Lomax

Courtney Campbell is a fictional character from the British soap opera Hollyoaks, played by Amy Conachan. The character and casting was announced in July 2016 and Conachan first appeared as Courtney on 29 August of that year. Courtney was introduced as the cousin of established characters Cameron Campbell (Cameron Moore) and Lockie Campbell (Nick Rhys), the latter of whom Courtney is trying to track down after he was murdered by Cameron. Courtney's initial storyline featured her involvement in the conclusion of Cameron's murder spree and her friendships with Cameron's fiancée, Leela Lomax (Kirsty-Leigh Porter), and her family. Conachan described Courtney as level headed and a family person that could take Cameron down, whilst critics described her as feisty. Conachan was happy that producers did not solely focus on Courtney's disability as she was determined that Courtney's storylines would not focus on her being in a wheelchair. The actress has praised Hollyoaks for not defining the character by her disability and allowing Courtney have fun "soapy" storylines, and believed that other shows could learn from that example.

Beginning in 2017, Courtney was central to a storyline where she becomes pregnant after a one-night-stand with Liam Donovan (Maxim Baldry) and she is unsure about whether to keep the baby. She decides against a termination and her manipulative grandmother, Granny Campbell (Jenny Lee), is introduced to cause issues for Courtney during her pregnancy, which was used to explore the character's backstory. Conachan did not oppose to her disability being brought up in the storyline as it would have been something that would be addressed if she was pregnant herself. Courtney also is given a love interest when Liam's brother, Jesse Donovan (Luke Jerdy), begins helping her during the pregnancy. After the birth of Courtney's daughter, Iona, Courtney and Jesse's romance faces more issues due to her grandmother's attempts to take Iona away by framing Courtney as a bad mother and a love triangle with Goldie McQueen (Chelsee Healey). After Jesse faces financial difficulties Courtney is blackmailed by Jesse and Liam's father, Glenn Donovan (Neil Roberts/Bob Cryer), into smuggling drugs for him after she falls behind in repaying his loan. This leads to Courtney meeting Liam (now Jude Monk McGowan) again in special episodes set in Magaluf. Conachan believed that Courtney is shocked to see him as she had given up any hope that Liam would do anything for her and Iona. After being arrested with drug-related charges, Courtney teams up with five other women (known as the WAGs) to kill Glenn. They are then targeted by a vengeful Liam, though it later transpires that none of them killed Glenn after all.

Courtney and Jesse marry in early 2020, but the marriage is short lived when Jesse dies on their wedding day from binge-drinking. Conachan was glad that the storyline could bring awareness to the dangers of drinking, and believed that she and Jerdy had portrayed the relationship well in order to create an impact on viewers. Conachan also explained that the soap would be exploring Courtney's grief following her husband's death. The following year, Courtney builds up a friendship with her student and Leela's foster son Sid Sumner (Billy Price), who develops a crush on her. When Sid kisses Courtney and lies that they had sex, Courtney is temporarily suspended. Conachan hoped that producers would not develop an inappropriate relationship between Courtney and Sid as she believed it would be strange due to Courtney being a maternal figure towards Sid. After the situation resolves, Courtney leaves for a new job in Scotland and Conachan made her last appearance as the character on 30 June 2021. Conachan explained that she had decided to leave the soap opera on a high after five years and did not rule out a return. Courtney was well received by critics and Conachan was nominated for "Best Actress" at the 2018 British Soap Awards. Courtney's joining with the WAGs was received positively, but the storylines where she is manipulated by her grandmother received criticism.

== Casting and characterisation ==
On 18 July 2016, it was announced that Scottish actress Amy Conachan had joined the cast of Hollyoaks as Courtney Campbell, the cousin of established characters Cameron Campbell (Cameron Moore) and Lockie Campbell (Nick Rhys), the latter of whom Courtney is trying to track down. It was reported that Courtney would join the Lomax household and teach science at Hollyoaks High, the secondary school of the soap's fictional setting. Conachan was excited to join the soap and to finally be able to talk about it, explaining, "Coming in as a new character to a show that's been successful for many years is something I'm really proud of. Everyone has been very welcoming and I'm looking forward to seeing how much trouble Courtney will cause in the village". Conachan also joked that she hoped Cameron is ready for Courtney's arrival.

Courtney was characterised as being rebellious. Conachan explained that whilst Courtney is quite "level-headed", she is also a bit of a "loose cannon". Conachan also described Courtney as a really being a "family person" and that she loves Lockie. Conachan told Inside Soap that Courtney's character would not be focused on her disability, explaining that whilst some of Conachan's previous parts had required a disability as part of their storylines, Courtney's was not, which she saw as a "really important step forward" for her as an actress and person. She added, "People are more educated and aware of disabilities nowadays, and I think having a girl in a wheelchair telling a story about her being in a wheelchair is a bit old now. For me, it's great that my first story had nothing to do with that whatsoever - and I just happen to be in a wheelchair." Conachan also described Courtney as "feisty and stubborn and she does what she wants and gets what she wants".

== Development ==
=== Introduction ===
Conachan made her first appearance as Courtney in the episode that aired on 29 August 2016. Courtney comes to Hollyoaks to find her missing cousin, Lockie Campbell (Nick Rhys), who unbeknownst to her was murdered by his brother, Cameron Campbell (Cameron Moore). She also comes to the village for the will reading of Cameron and Lockie's father. Cameron is not happy to see her and tries to get her to leave, which leads to his pregnant fiancé, Leela Lomax (Kirsty-Leigh Porter), finding herself in the middle of the pair. Courtney makes some friends in the village and helps convince Tom Cunningham (Ellis Hollins) to let Cameron's daughter, Peri Lomax (Ruby O'Donnell), look after their daughter Steph Cunningham-Lomax. Courtney gets closer to the Lomax family and begins working at Hollyoaks High School, which Peri attends.

Conachan teased that Courtney's arrival could lead to comeuppance of Cameron, who by that point had already killed Lockie, Sam Lomax (Lizzie Roper), Danny Lomax (Stephen Billington) and Ziggy Roscoe (Fabrizio Santino). The actress told OK! that she hoped that Courtney would be the one to ensure that Cameron gets his comeuppance as Courtney "knows what she wants" and is similar to Cameron "temperament-wise", and also because Courtney would be determined for it. Conachan explained that there would be "fireworks" between her and Cameron and that tension would build up as Cameron looks more into Lockie's disappearance, adding that Courtney "just really gets going, and the audience may feel slightly worried for Cameron because she's really on a mission". Conachan believed that Courtney would be initially "absolutely heartbroken" if she found out what happened to Lockie and also really angry. Conachan added that Courtney "kind of trusts Cameron right now, and that would shock her. She'd never see that coming!" Conachan told Inside Soap that she believed that whilst Cameron is a dangerous criminal that Courtney should be wary of, she believed that Courtney had it in "in her" to take on Cameron, explaining, "if anyone can give as good as she gets, it's Courtney".

"It would never even cross [Courtney's] mind that Cameron would do anything to harm Lockie, but when she gets into properly looking for him and she's not getting the support from Cameron she does get quite suspicious after a while. But she doesn't really know what's happening, and she'd never in a million years suspect it's Cameron."

— Conachan on Courtney's suspicions of Cameron (2016)

Courtney perseveres to find Lockie, which increasingly frustrates Cameron. A concerned Courtney continues searching for answers about Lockie and pushes Cameron for them as she is "increasingly suspicious" of him. Leela tells Courtney the "truth" about Lockie's drug use, but this does not stop Courtney from persevering with her mission and she sets up a missing person's page for Lockie. Courtney's search for her cousin leads to a "big week" for the Lomax and Campbell families as Leela ends up collapsing and Cameron promises her that no one, including Courtney, will stand in the way of them becoming parents again.

Courtney later puts up posters around the village about Lockie but is forced to remove them when Cameron tells her that Leela has high blood pressure and needs to be kept calm, though the posters turn out to be "the least of Cameron's worries" as he is asked by the police to identify a body that they have found. Cameron tells the police that the body is not Lockie's but lies to his family that it is, hoping that it will finally deter investigating his disappearance. However, this "upsetting development" makes Courtney more determined to get answers and she piles pressure onto Cameron as to why Lockie's body has not been released in order to give him a "proper send-off". Cameron continues to stall her, so Courtney – not wanting to be "fobbed off" any longer – asks Leela's sister, Tegan Lomax (Jessica Ellis), to secretly go to the mortuary after Cameron convinces Courtney not to; when Tegan returns, she reveals that the body is not there.

In January 2017, Courtney was involved in Cameron's "unmissable exit week" and the conclusion of his storyline. In the episodes, Courtney and the Lomax family head to a remote log cabin for a short break, but this takes a "horrifying turn" due to "Killer Cameron" as Tegan and Courtney discover the dead body of Celine McQueen (Sarah George), who Cameron murdered the previous month. Courtney tries to call the police, but Cameron snatches the phone off her and Courtney tries to reason with him when he angrily grabs Tegan. These scenes were filmed in November 2016, and a trailer was released to promote the episodes; as Courtney and Tegan were not shown in the trailer footage of Cameron chasing Leela and Peri, this led to speculation that Courtney and Tegan would be Cameron's "next unlucky victims".

=== Pregnancy and Granny ===
Following Cameron's arrest, Courtney continues to live with Leela and Tegan, staying their housemate and friend, and she supports Leela when she gets a stalker. Conachan revealed that she loves the Lomax family and working with the actresses. In April 2017, Courtney tries to support Tegan in flirting with Liam Donovan (Maxim Baldry) during a night out. However, in a "surprise twist", Liam ends up taking an interest in Courtney instead and decides to go with her as he is intrigued with her and wants to have fun following the death of his fiancée, Eva Falco (Kerry Bennett). Courtney and Liam's fling takes place shortly before Liam leaves the village, following Baldry's departure from the soap opera. That May, Courtney finds out that she is pregnant with Liam's baby. Courtney is unhappy when Nancy also finds out after seeing her looking at a pregnancy website at work and tells her to back off. Her housemates, Tegan and Leela, are stunned when they find out that Courtney is pregnant and support her decision to have a termination. However, after talking to Nancy again, Courtney changes her mind and decides to keep the baby and keeps this decision a secret from her housemates. Conachan was happy that Hollyoaks had decided to explore Courtney being pregnant as she felt that pregnant disabled people was something that had not been seen on the soap opera before and a "taboo" topic that people do not talk about often. She added that it was a personal thing for her too, and that she believed it was important to get the topic "out there" and "make it more normal". Conachan explained that Courtney was initially keeping her pregnancy a secret as the character likes the idea that she is the only one who knows about it, as it gives her time to get used to it and how it is going to change her life. When asked by Inside Soap what advice she would give Courtney, Conachan responded to "Just take every day as it comes", and that Courtney does not need to know "exactly" what will happen in the future, as no one does.

In July 2017, Jenny Lee debuted as Courtney's grandmother, Granny Campbell, who immediately discovers Courtney's pregnancy and encourages her to move back home to Scotland, offering to help raise Courtney's child as she believes that Courtney will need more support after the birth. Courtney's "infamous grandmother" had been referred to by Courtney several times since Courtney's debut in the soap. Courtney is shocked and unhappy when her "nosy" grandmother arrives three weeks earlier than expected. Conachan was excited about Lee's debut on the soap as she enjoyed working with new people. She was also very "keen" to see where the storyline would go due to Granny being someone that only Courtney knows, and because Courtney had not had many relatives around her until that point. Conachan explained that whilst there is "a lot of love" between Courtney and grandmother as she was the one who raised her, it is also "a really volatile relationship because they are both big characters, so they jar a lot". The actress explained that Courtney likes to be independent and has been living her life in Hollyoaks for a while on her own and thus she does not take well to having her grandmother "turn up out of the blue and try to mother her". Granny shows her "sneaky side" by sneakily telling Tegan and Leela about Courtney's pregnancy in the hopes that they will back up Granny's encouragement to move to Scotland.

Courtney pushes herself too hard and feels unwell at work, which results in her being forced to take maternity leave by headteacher Sally St. Claire (Annie Wallace) after leaving another student in charge of her class. Jessie continues to support her, but Courtney later struggles to breathe and cannot reach her phone. Tegan finds her and rushes her to hospital with Jessie by her side, and whilst Courtney is later relieved to learn that her baby is okay, Tegan urges her to use this as a wake up call and take some time off.

When Liam's brother, Jesse Donovan (Luke Jerdy), finds out about Courtney's pregnancy, he supports Courtney and they later agree to co-parent the baby together. However, Liam and Jesse's father, Glenn Donovan (Neil Roberts/Bob Cryer) believes that Jesse is focussing too much on Courtney and so pays Lisa Loveday (Rachel Adedeji) to flirt with him, which makes Courtney jealous. Courtney and Jesse develop feelings for each other but are not honest about it. The following month, Courtney's grandmother returns and rushes Courtney to the hospital as a precaution after experiencing high blood pressure. Jesse arrives late and Courtney tells him that their arrangement needs to end, which leaves him heartbroken. Unbeknownst to Courtney, her grandmother has been summoned by Glenn, who wants to save Jesse from the "burden" of looking after Courtney in her pregnancy. Digital Spy teased that Courtney's decision to give her grandmother a second would lead to her grandmother "controlling her every move". Courtney ends up being "at the mercy of" her controlling grandmother when she lies that Courtney has pre-eclampsia and orders her to take bed-rest. She then takes away her wheelchair so that she cannot contact anyone or move around. Meanwhile, concerned on by Granny's controlling nature and Jesse's heartbreak, Tegan tries to play matchmaker and tells Jesse that Courtney wants to be more than friends with him.

=== Motherhood ===
Courtney ends up giving birth to her daughter in the soap's hour-long Christmas episode, which was broadcast on Channel 4 on 22 December 2017. Hollyoaks executive producer Bryan Kirkwood had previously teased that Courtney would be one of the central character in the soap opera's 2017 Christmas episodes, explaining, "It wouldn't be Christmas in soap without the arrival of a baby! Courtney gives birth to her much-longed-for daughter. It's a real punch-the-air moment to see that brilliant battler get what she's always wanted".

In the storyline, Jesse arranges a "cheesy Christmas disco" for Courtney and later leaves her a present and card professing his love, but Granny puts them in the bin. Jesse is still waiting for a response from an "oblivious" Courtney when she goes into labour and is rushed to hospital. Jessie then goes to the hospital to tell her how he feels. The episode was intended to show whether Jesse and Courtney would finally have a future together following Granny and Glenn's meddling, with it being reported that the storyline would be resolved "one way or another" in the following episodes. Following Ioana's birth and the beginning of Courtney's motherhood journey, a doll was used to portray Ioana for some of her scenes.

Conachan warned that Courtney and Jesse's happiness would not last and that the "weird" relationship between Granny Campbell and Courtney would be further explored, adding, "We'll go down a much darker route from here on in. It's not happy families for any of them". The actress explained that Granny immediately "bombarding" Courtney with negative comments makes Courtney start doubting herself, and Conachan hinted that Granny has a hidden agenda to take the baby away. Her grandmother tries to manipulate Courtney into moving to Scotland with her, but when Courtney is "adamant" that she wants to stay in Hollyoaks, her grandmother tries to recruit Glenn into her "evil" scheme; however, he initially stands his ground and refuses, saying that Courtney is capable of looking after Iona. Granny then attempts to sabotage Courtney's "new-found happiness" by making her think that she is not able to look after Iona alone, with Courtney becoming increasingly anxious and breaking down to Jesse due to her grandmother constantly picking at her. Granny suggests to Courtney that her feeling "lower than ever" may be because of post-natal depression, which prompts Courtney to do research and seek medical advice, though Granny is able to make Courtney feel worse again. Believing that she is an unfit parent, she asks her grandmother to become Iona's legal guardian. Jesse later finds evidence that Courtney's grandmother has been setting Courtney up but this comes too late as Courtney has signed the legal paperwork. However, Glenn later takes Iona back and an "empowered" Courtney later finds the courage to deliver a "verbal smackdown" to Granny and tells her leave her life and threatens legal action. Following the airing of the episode, the Hollyoaks Twitter account wrote "so long", suggesting that it was the end of Granny's stint.

=== Love triangle ===
Courtney was later involved in a love triangle between Jesse and Goldie. This begins when Jesse reaffirms his commitment to Courtney and they decide to be together following her grandmother's antics, but their happiness is "short lived" when Goldie calls him from prison, which makes Jesse torn between the two women. Jesse tells Goldie that he loves her when he visits her in prison. When Goldie is released, she believes that she is in a relationship with Jesse and announces to her family that they are back together, but Jesse tries to stop her as he is still with Courtney and does not want her to know. Courtney and Goldie later find out that Jesse cheated and he has to convince them to give him another chance. Jerdy revealed that he felt sorry for Jesse, as he was trying to please everyone and got into a situation where he was not sure whether to pick Courtney or Goldie, and whilst Jesse is aware that he should be loyal to Courtney, he thinks that there is something "sexy" and "exotic" about Goldie. Jerdy believed that Jesse is better suited to Courtney as she is "stable and loyal" and can provide him with the family that he has always wanted, and he loves her deep down. Jerdy also hoped that he and Courtney would get married and have a big "Hollyoaks wedding", which he believed would go "horribly wrong" in a comedic way. Jerdy enjoyed working with Conachan, calling her "so much fun".

=== Blackmail, Magaluf and Liam's return ===
When Jesse continues having financial issues at his salon, Courtney asks Glenn for a loan behind Jesse's back. Glenn gets her to sign a document that she has not read as part of the agreement when she picks up the money, saying it is because she is borrowing money through the business. Sophie Dainty from Digital Spy hinted that Courtney could get into "danger" due to being "obvious that Glenn's intentions are "far from genuine", and questioned whether Courtney had made a "big mistake" and "sealed her fate".

In August 2018, it was announced that Liam would be returning to Hollyoaks, with the role recast to Jude Monk McGowan. Justin Harp Digital Spy teased that Liam's reunion with Courtney could be an "unhappy" one, and added that whilst it was possible that Liam could become involved in Iona's life, it seemed to be a "long" way to go. Monk McGowan explained that it is difficult to accept responsibility for Iona as she is not only an accidental pregnancy from his one-night-stand, but also because the idea of having a child with the women that he loves "is dead" due to Eva being killed when she was pregnant, adding, "Becoming the father to Eva's child was a future which didn't happen, and for him, that was his one shot at having a family". Conachan believed that it would be interesting to see if there would be any rivalry between Liam and Jesse due to Jesse being a father-figure to Iona. When asked how Courtney feels about seeing Liam again, Conachan believed that Courtney is more shocked rather than angry as she believed that her character had given up any hope that Liam would do anything for her and their daughter by now.

That same month, Conachan joined the McQueen family in their trip to Magaluf as part of Hollyoaks's overseas shoot, which was dubbed "#Magalufoaks". It was reported that the trip would be one of the "highly-anticipated" storylines of the year. It was also reported that Courtney would first cross paths with Liam in Magaluf. In the storyline, Courtney is asked to come to the family's holiday by her good friend Sally, who wants her to be there for her as a friend; Conachan explained that Courtney believes that it will be a nice "break" that the she deserves after having a baby and all of the "madness" that happened at home, though the actress teased that there could be another motive for Courtney. Conachan explained that Courtney is only connected to the McQueens through Sally, though added that she has a "strange relationship" with Goldie due to their love triangle with Jesse. Conachan found filming with the McQueens "really fun", adding, "I feel like Courtney is one of the more normal characters in the show, it's a little different to work with a family who is really strong with larger than life characters, it forces me to up my performance a little bit". Conachan also teased that her scenes as Courtney would "naturally" be more "comical" due to the nature of the McQueen family. Conachan enjoyed filming abroad and found it exciting, explaining, "I had worked on a theatre show before abroad in Spain but it wasn't quite the same thing, this was more fun, I felt like I was on holiday whilst also working, it was so strange". Conachan struggled to pinpoint her favourite moment in the soap as "there were so many good" ones, but believed that it was the scene where they paraded on the strip, which was the dubbed the "here come the girls" scene. The actress later revealed in 2021 that this was her Hollyoaks highlight, calling the storyline "incredible" and declaring that week to be the most fun week that she had had. She added, "I never thought I'd do a storyline where I was smuggling drugs in my wheelchair and trying to get them through an international border! Getting to go to Spain to do it was the cherry on the cake".

Meanwhile, Courtney falls behind on her repayments to Glenn, who tells her that the amount she owes has doubled due to interest. When he finds out that she is going to Magaluf, Glenn blackmails Courtney into smuggling drugs for him, threatening to tell Jesse if she does not, so Courtney reluctantly agrees. Dainty questioned whether Courtney would "live to regret" her decision if she got caught. Glenn gives "strict instructions" to Courtney that she must return with drugs from Magaluf and it is revealed that Liam is the dealer of the drugs. When she arrives in Magaluf, a "distracted "Courtney secretly goes to meet up with Liam, which is spotted by "eagle-eyed" Goldie. Goldie jumps to the wrong conclusions and believes that Courtney is cheating on Jesse with his brother and she threatens to tell him.

=== WAGs and plotting against Glenn ===
Glenn later has a change of heart about blackmailing Courtney after she becomes engaged to Jesse and he tears up the agreement. However, Courtney is caught returning the drugs to Glenn's office and she finds herself in "hot water" with the police. Things then get "worse" for Courtney when a social worker takes Iona away from Courtney during the drugs investigation. Courtney is then shocked to find out Granny Campbell has returned and will be taking care of Iona. Beth Allcock from OK! believed that Granny spoke with more than "a hint of glee" after she had finally gotten Iona in her "clutches". Following this, Jesse briefly leaves Courtney, with Conachan believing that Courtney now has been left with "nothing" because of Glenn.

Courtney then teams up with Jesse and Liam's half-sister Grace Black (Tamara Wall), along with Farrah Maalik (Krupa Pattani), Kim Butterfield (Daisy Wood-Davis), Maxine Minniver (Nikki Sanderson) and Simone Loveday (Jacqueline Boatswain) to bring Glenn down. The six women were labelled the "WAGs", and it was hinted that the group could "driven to murder" to murder him. Discussing a possible motive that Courtney may have against Glenn, Conachan told Digital Spy, "In Courtney's eyes, Glenn has completely ruined her whole life. Everything was going pretty well before she got involved with him. Although things were difficult financially, she had Iona and Jesse, and she was really happy". Conachan explained that Courtney saw Glenn as a "comrade" after he helped her with her grandmother, and whilst she know that he had a dark side, she believed that he would not turn on her, which was proven wrong. Conachan added that Liam's return to the village has hindered the WAGs' plan to kill Glenn as they know that would "destroy" them if he found out what they were doing. Conachan added, "Liam has been closely associated with half the reasons Courtney wants to get rid of Glenn in the first place. He was the one that gave her the drugs in Spain, and if he had been around to be a father to Iona, maybe she wouldn't be with Granny Campbell now. In her opinion, Liam and Glenn are two sides of the same coin, and the further away they are from her the better". Further discussing the plot, Conachan said:

"When Courtney agreed to team up with the rest of the women, it was a spur of the moment decision, fuelled with a lot of emotion. She was in a determined rage since Jesse had just dumped her. However, the reality of it is going to be more difficult. She's definitely capable of doing it – let's not forget that she comes from the same family as serial killer Cameron – but she's not a bad person, so it doesn't come naturally to her. I think the consequences might be a bit too much for her, though. She's smart enough to know how high the risk factor is, and what's at stake. At the end of the day, the main focus is getting Iona back, and I'm not sure the fury towards Glenn is enough to risk losing her daughter forever. Courtney is a clever girl, who thinks with her head, rather than her heart, which can't be said for Maxine or Grace. She'll be the one to reality check them from time to time, and make sure they're all staying on track."

Glenn's "reign of terror" finally ends when the WAGs take inspiration from the novel Murder on the Orient Express and all poison Glenn's drink, which triggers a fatal heart attack for him. Glenn's portrayer, Bob Cryer, "loved" the twist of Glenn's death having an "Agatha Christie-esque twist" by having the WAGs team up to kill him, telling Digital Spy, "There was a brilliant team-building nature among the WAGs. Every week, they seemed to get themselves a new member. It was fantastic, bold and funny too, because the story had its lighter moments. Now it's all come together, with a brilliant array of talent involved". Cryer also noted that viewers enjoyed the teaming up of Courtney with the other WAGs and some had asked if they could team up against other villains, with Cryer joking that they could be like Avengers Assemble and do it only for special occasions. Following Glenn's death, Liam vows revenge on the WAGs as he believes that they are responsible. Liam then "cruelly" targets Courtney when he tries to get answers over his father's death, with Digital Spy suggesting that he could pose a risk to the WAGs as he gets "dangerously close" to finding out about their pact. Liam then threatens to take Iona away from Courtney if she does not tell him the truth about what happened, which she reluctantly agrees to. However, later that month, it is revealed that Courtney and the other WAGs did not actually go through with poisoning Glenn, and it was in fact serial killer Breda McQueen (Moya Brady) who murdered him.

=== Disability ===
Courtney is disabled, as is Conachan, who has a rare spinal condition. When she initially joined Hollyoaks, there were few mentions about Courtney using a wheelchair or being disabled onscreen; Conachan was determined that it not be the case that Courtney's storyline would just be about her in a wheelchair. Courtney's pregnancy was the first time that the character's disability was the focus of a storyline, which the actress was fine with as it was something that would need to be addressed if she herself was pregnant. Conachan believed that although there had been progress, there needed to be more representation onscreen of disabled actors and characters, adding, "And we also need more interesting stories. I think people are a bit bored with the 'whole woe is me, it's a shame I'm in a wheelchair' thing. That's a misrepresentation of life as a disabled person. I've had a very positive experience and view being in a wheelchair as a small part of my life".

"If you've got a disability and you're on TV, a lot of time you play the victim and I don't think that's an accurate representation of disability in general. It's fun for me to play a part like Courtney that's about interesting stories rather than trying to tell a story about being in a wheelchair - I'm bored of playing disabled people saying it's a terrible thing, and I'm sure audiences are bored of seeing it."

— Conachan on disability representation (2019)

In 2019, Conachan featured in Hollyoaks' special one-off documentary titled Hollyoaks - See The Person, which was intended to celebrate the importance of diversity in the soap opera following its special diversity episode. In the documentary, Conachan noted that she could play Juliet as William Shakespeare did not say that she was not in a wheelchair. Later that year, Conachan explained on the Hollyoaks podcast Don't Filter Feelings that when she joined the soap opera, she was very conscious that she did not want to tell "any more stories about how hard it is being disabled and how much of a shame it is if people are disabled". She believed that it would not be "representative" of disabilities, and that she would struggle to portray that as she had not experienced that herself. The response that Conachan got made her feel that everyone felt the same way about it. She added, "In the world that I live in, having a disability is not a bad thing. Also I don't think that it's good to continue telling that story. I think it feeds ableism a little bit, when we always tell stories about how hard it is to be disabled. I think in its simplest form, people are bored of seeing that story and I want to tell other stories". Joe Anderton from Digital Spy wrote that whilst viewers may expect Hollyoaks to have storylines depicted on Courtney's disability due to the soap's focus on diversity, he believed that the soap did not focus on Courtney's for a "good reason", citing Conachan's response.

Reflecting on the role in 2021, Conachan believed that it was "incredible" that Courtney was not defined by her disability and praised Hollyoaks for it. She explained that when she joined the soap, she was "adamant" that that was the type of character that she wanted to play as she had had several roles in the past "where they'd been looking for someone in a wheelchair, or wanted to tell a story with someone about them being in a wheelchair", which Conachan did not want to do anymore as she found it a bit boring and not representative of what living with a disability is like. The actress explained that Hollyoaks supported Conachan's idea and that it was not their intention to have the plot revolving Courtney's disability. Conachan added, "Courtney just happened to be in a wheelchair, but she was going to do the same fun, soapy stuff as everybody else. Other productions, writers and directors could learn from Hollyoaks in that manner. It's been a privilege for me to be able to champion that".

=== Jesse's death ===
Jesse and Courtney marry in episodes that were originally broadcast in January 2020. Conachan found filming the wedding scenes "exciting", explaining, "Those scenes are always so fun to film, because there are so many guests and you have supporting artists as well. So often in a soap you do two-hander scenes, or there'll be three or four people in a scene at the most. To see how it works on that bigger scale was exciting. Obviously with any soap wedding there's drama that comes along with it, so it was exciting to play that too". The actress also found the filming tiring due to the scenes requiring long days, but she still enjoyed it. Conachan was also happy to be working with O'Donell and Porter during the wedding scenes, due to Peri and Leela featuring in the episodes, but also was glad to work with different people too.

Prior to the episodes' broadcast, it was announced that there would be a "shocking revelation" when Jesse finds out shortly before the wedding that Grace shot Mercedes McQueen (Jennifer Metcalfe). Jerdy explained to Inside Soap that Jesse wants to keep Grace away from Courtney as he does not want her to ruin her "happy day", adding, "There are lots of nice moments during the wedding, but for Jesse the whole thing is tainted by the information he's just found out". It was also teased by Jerdy that something would happen that would "shock" viewers and there would be "quite a poignant message attached that it's worth reminding people of". It was also reported by that the wedding would have a big "twist" and that Jesse and that Courtney's happiness with Jesse would be "short live", with Digital Spy writing, "It's all about to go wrong", though it was not specified what would happen. During the wedding, Courtney is touched by Jesse's vows towards her and Iona and does not realise how burdened he is with his sister's secret. Courtney is confused when Jesse makes an announcement about their future as it seems to have come "out of the blue". Unable to handle the secret, Jesse recklessly goes on a drinking binge and, unbeknownst to Courtney, ends up collapsing. When Courtney awakens the next day, ready to go on her honeymoon, she finds out that Jesse is not there, and she is confused as to why he did not come to bed. Courtney is then told that Jesse has died after drinking too much alcohol on the wedding day.

Conachan revealed that the Hollyoaks producers had called her to tell her that Jesse would be killed-off, which really shocked her. She admitted that she would miss Jerdy and felt that she was "grieving for him in real life now", but added that they would remain in contact due to the friendship, with Conachan being excited about Jerdy's future plans due to being his "biggest fan"; she also revealed that she had planned his leaving party due to being his "wife". The actress thought the storyline would be very sad because "such a real situation", explaining that is "not one of these really far-fetched events that is just built up for the drama of it. That's where the heartbreak lies, because you could imagine something like this happening in real life." Conachan was glad that the storyline would raise awareness of dangers of binge drinking as she believed that it could help people drinking more during the Christmas period to think about how their body may react to the alcohol, as Jesse did not previously drink much alcohol and died because of only one night of binge drinking, and thus it would shock people and make them think. Conachan hoped that she and Jerdy had done their jobs "correctly" and built up Courtney and Jesse's relationship "right" so that the outcome would be "hard to watch". Conachan revealed that Jesse's death would impact Courtney and show her vulnerable side, though she added that Courtney would initially try to fight it as it is her instinct to carry on and keep going. The actress added that due to her grief, Courtney would be quite sad for a while, explaining "We don't want her to just be fine straight away, because it's not the reality of it. We'll see her low and vulnerable for a while." Conachan hinted that the soap would see her more with the Lomax family. The actress hoped that she would be involved in the soap's County Lines drug dealing storyline involving the family, which Conachan believed would be appreciate due to Courtney working at the school. She believed that working with the young cast was a "joy" due to their talents, and hoped to be part of the storyline as she believed that it would be "exciting and important".

=== Suspension ===
In 2021, Courtney supports her student Sid Sumner (Billy Price), who Leela has fostered, with his partial leg amputation and encourages him to pursue his career in joining the police, which leads to Sid developing romantic feelings towards Courtney. Conachan had previously had scenes with Price in the school setting, which the actress found fun. Courtney and Sid's student-teacher relationship takes "a rather different turn" when Sid misreads the signs and kisses her, which Courtney tells him is inappropriate. That May, Courtney has an "exciting time" in her career as she is due to be interviewed for acting deputy head at Hollyoaks High. At the same time, Courtney becomes aware Sid has a crush on her when she finds him in a drunken state. Courtney explains to him that she does not have the same feelings for him as he is a student. However, Sid takes a picture of them whilst they are under the bike sheds, which leads to a "shocking" rumour about Courtney being spread due to Sid sharing the photo and "bragging" to his friends that he had sex with his teacher to prove to them that he is not sexually inexperienced. The rumour is started when Sid is set up on a blind date but tells his friends that it will not work as he likes older women, which leads him to lie that he has sex with Courtney.

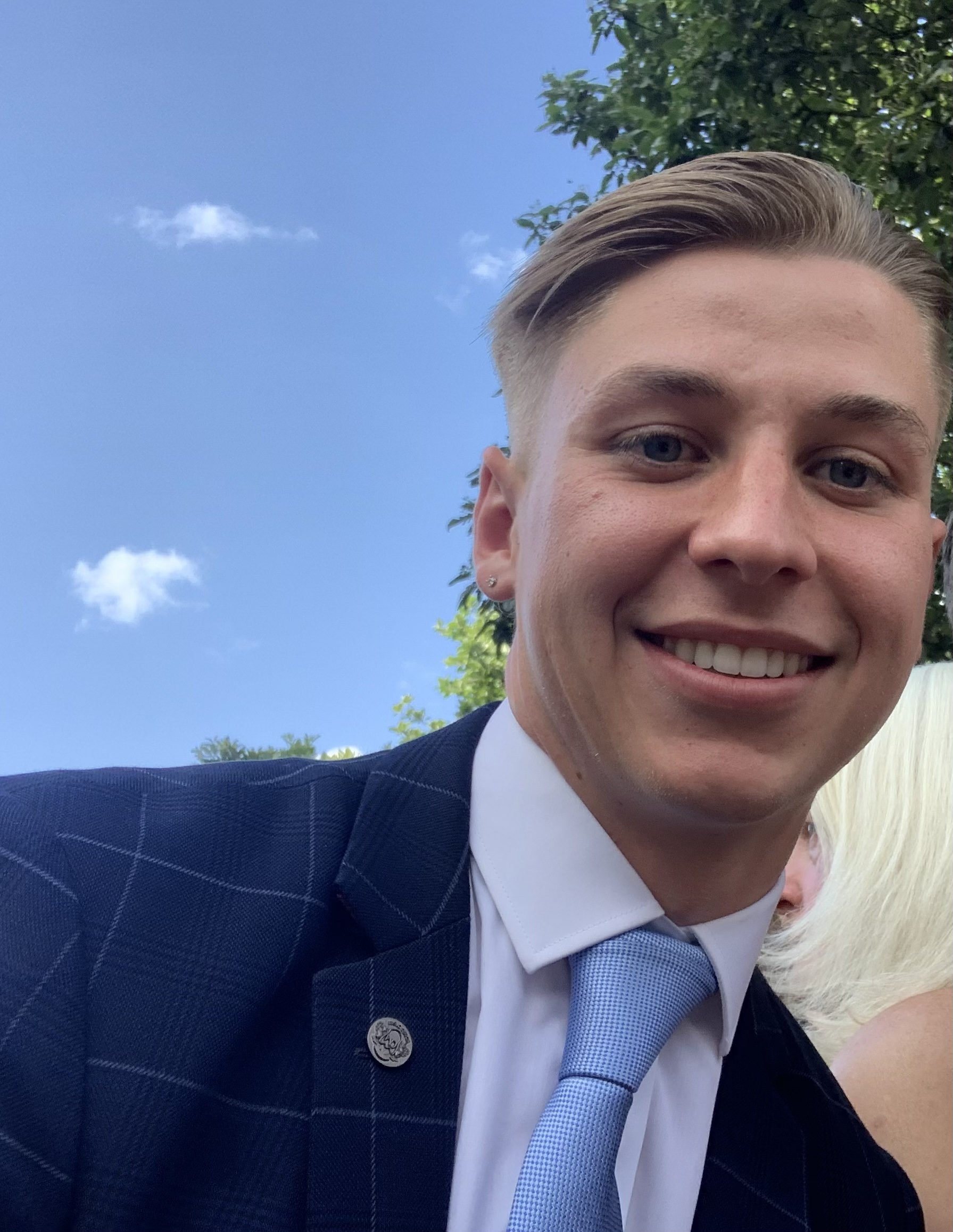
Billy Price portrays Sid, who develops feelings for Courtney.

Courtney realises that her career is at risk when acting headteacher Nancy Hayton (Jessica Fox) warns her that they need to discuss Courtney's relationship with Sid. Daniel Kilkelly from Digital Spy speculated whether Courtney would be able to prove that she has done nothing wrong. Sid tells Courtney that he will try to sort the rumours out when Courtney is questioned about "seducing innocent school boys" by journalist Yasmine Maalik (Haiesha Mistry, who threatens to publish a story about that in the school newspaper. Courtney puts out one "fire" by threatening Yasmine with a libel suit, which makes her back down, but another fire is "brewing" when Courtney tells Nancy that she did not expect Sid to lie about having sex. Nancy, who was unaware about the rumour and had wanted to talk about the photo, is "gobsmacked" when she learns about it and suspends Courtney from the school, pending a full investigation. Being accused of a crime and at risk of going to prison, Courtney tells Sid how serious the situation has become and despite Sid promising that she will not get in trouble, an angry Courtney snaps at him, leaving him "reeling".

Speaking about the storyline to Inside Soap, Conachan revealed that she felt sorry for Sid and believed that Courtney does too, calling her "emotionally aware and mature" and that as she works with children, she realises why Sid has taken the photo and spread the rumours. The actress explained that whilst Courtney is angry, she also understands and "loves" Sid regardless. She attributed Sid's actions to the amount of stuff that he had been through in a short period of time, adding, "I think Sid's problem at the moment is that he can't distinguish between caring for someone and having a crush on them". The actress also revealed that initially, Courtney has no idea that Sid has feelings for her and feels "shocked and embarrassed" and aware that Sid likely feels so too, and so she shrugs it off as she works in a school and knows that teenagers do "silly things". Conachan confirmed that Courtney does not have feelings towards Sid and hoped that the storyline would not develop into a two-way student-teacher romantic relationship, which had been depicted in Hollyoaks before. The actress believed that it would be a "shame" if the storyline developed that way and thought it would be strange due to Courtney being a maternal figure towards Sid, though she admitted, "you never know what's around the corner..."

=== Departure ===
"I hadn't done a whole lot before I was on Hollyoaks. I was only at drama school for a year and there's loads of things that I want to do. The training that I got at Hollyoaks was probably the best job that I could have done so early in my career. Even though it was me that said it was maybe the right time to do something else, it was still very much a hard decision for me because Hollyoaks was just the best job ever. It's a one-of-a-kind opportunity when you're an actor, to go to the same place every day, see the same people and play the same character. But it just felt like the right time for me to leave..."

— Conachan on her decision to leave the soap (2021)

In 2021, Conachan departed Hollyoaks and last aired as Courtney on 30 June of that year, which had not been announced beforehand. After a successful interview, Courtney is offered a headteacher job in Scotland due to being considered the perfect candidate, but is told that she will have to move immediately. Courtney is unsure of what to do and her friends give her conflicting advice. Grace and Sid plead with Courtney to stay, which she agrees to; however, Ste notices how much she wants to go and berates Sid. Sid and Grace are among those giving Courtney a send off as she leaves and Courtney asks Grace to go to the cemetery to tell Jesse that she still loves him, which an emotional Grace agrees to and thanks her for making Jesse so happy. Courtney calls the people wishing her off her "family" and tells them that she will always be there for them. Sid tells her to get some happiness for herself and an excited and emotional Courtney then leaves in a taxi.

Speaking to Digital Spy, Conachan explained that it was her decision to leave as she wanted to "go out on a high" and believed that being on the soap for five years felt like "nice, round number". Conachan felt lucky to have been on the soap for five years due to the difficulties of being in the acting industry. She began considering leaving the role prior to the COVID-19 pandemic and discussed this with Kirkwood; they both wanted a "nice ending" for the character and the exit had been "in the pipeline for a while". Conachan left the writers to write the character's exit storyline but was adamant that she did not want Courtney to be running away from anything, including because of what happened with Sid, as she did not want to leave Courtney on a "bad note" and ruin her relationship with Sid. Conachan wanted Courtney to leave to "further herself", and also did not want Courtney to be killed-off so that she could possibly return to the soap in the future. Conachan believed it was a shame that her exit scenes and final year on set had been restricted by COVID-19 protocols, but by the time she felt her exit scenes she was able to see some of her Hollyoaks cast members socially, which she was grateful about. The actress expressed that she would stay in touch with several of her cast members, including Jerdy, Daisy Wood-Davis (Kim Butterfield) and Jessamy Stoddart (Liberty Savage), who she became close to on the soap.

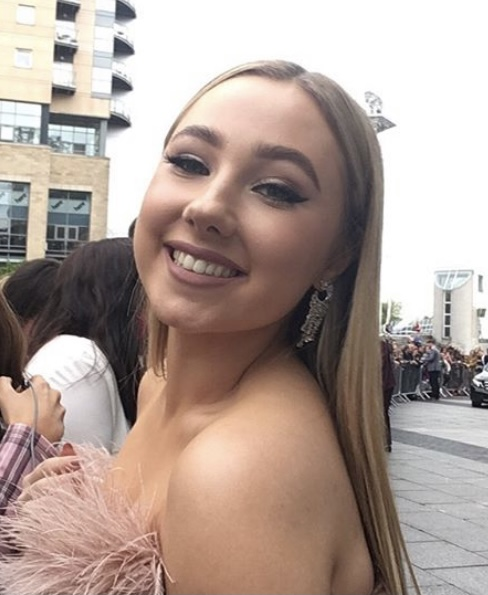
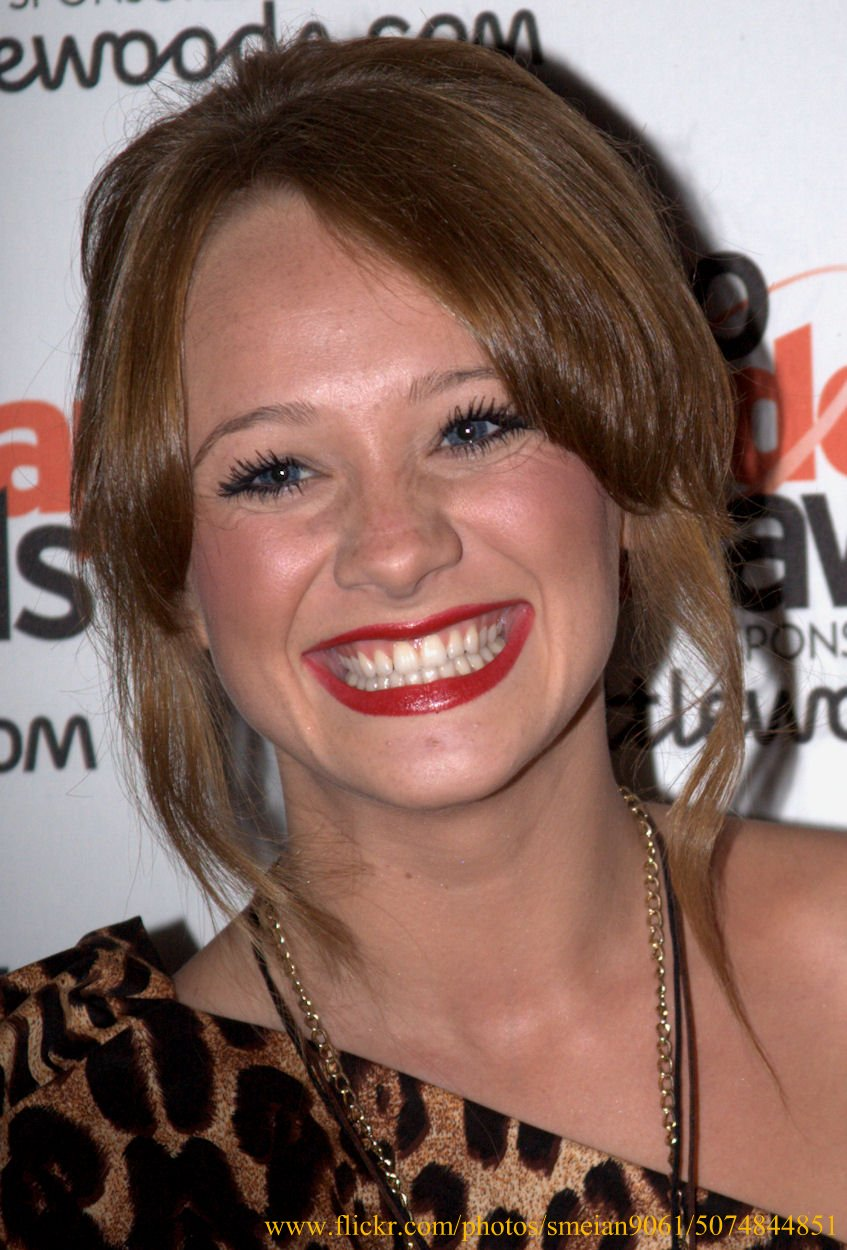
Conachan enjoyed working with Ruby O'Donnell (left) and Kirsty-Leigh Porter (right).

Conachan explained that towards the end of filming, she felt emotional and "a bit of a woman on the edge", and she then became emotional when she realised that Courtney would not be airing anymore. She added, "It's strange when it's such a big part of your life for five years and then it's just gone. It's a funny one to get your head around". Conachan was sad that Porter, who was on maternity leave, was not present in her exit scenes due to Leela being a big reason for Courtney's arrival to Hollyoaks, but explained that she was happy for Porter and they had messaged each other and realised that they had filmed their final scenes before Porter left. She added, "Courtney's final scenes were with [Leela's half-brother] Ste and Peri at the Lomaxes', so it has still come full circle. Leela was very much there in spirit." Conachan hoped that fans would remember Courtney's storylines and regard her as a character who added a lot of to show, and she characterised Courtney as being a "fierce, feisty Scottish girl" who ruffled feathers and supported other characters. Explaining her future plans, Conachan revealed that she had a few projects that she had already done and that she was prepared to work hard.

Courtney was referred to in 2023 during Grace's exit storyline, as an imprisoned Grace sends her son Curtis Royle to live with Courtney in Scotland.

== Storylines ==
Courtney arrives looking for answers about her missing cousin, Lockie Campbell (Nick Rhys). She gets a frosty reception from his brother, Cameron Campbell (Cameron Moore), who tells her to leave. However, Cameron's fiancée Leela Lomax (Kirsty-Leigh Porter) allows Courtney to stay at their house. Courtney and Cameron have a heart-to-heart where Courtney reveals that she held a grudge against him for breaking her favourite teddy bear and they then make up. Courtney helps Cameron's daughter, Peri Lomax (Ruby O'Donnell), with seeing her daughter, Steph Cunningham-Lomax. Courtney continues searching for Lockie and is unaware that Cameron had murdered him months prior. Courtney gets a job as a science teacher despite initially clashing with Sally St. Claire (Annie Wallace), the headteacher. Courtney and Cameron clash when Courtney puts up posters about Lockie's disappearance around the village and creates a website aimed at finding him. Cameron is told to identify a body and lies to Courtney that it is Lockie's to get to stop looking. Courtney becomes confused as to why "Lockie's" body has not been released to give him a proper goodbye. Courtney later finds out that Cameron killed Lockie and several other people, which devastates her. Cameron is imprisoned for his crimes and Courtney decides to return to Scotland when Goldie McQueen (Chelsee Healey) – the cousin of one of Cameron's victims, Celine McQueen (Sarah George) – blames her for her murder. However, Leela and her sister Tegan Lomax (Jessica Ellis) convince Courtney to stay.

Whilst trying to wingman Tegan on a night out, Courtney has a one night stand with Liam Donovan (Maxim Baldry). After Liam leaves the village, Courtney finds out that she is pregnant and considers having an abortion but decides against it, although she does not tell Tegan or Leela about this. Courtney's grandmother, Granny Campbell (Jenny Lee), arrives in Hollyoaks and tries to convince Courtney to move to Scotland with her. Courtney receives support from Liam's brother, Jesse Donovan (Luke Jerdy), and they decide to co-parent the baby together. Courtney and Jesse develop feelings for each other, which they finally admit to after Courtney gives birth to Iona Campbell. Jesse and Liam's father, Glenn Donovan (Neil Roberts/Bob Cryer) and Granny work together to keep the couple apart. Courtney is manipulated by Granny Campbell into thinking that she is not suitable to raise Iona and believes that she has post-natal depression. Granny, who wants to take Iona, is able to manipulate Courtney into giving her away her parental rights to the child, but she is scared off by Glenn.

When Jesse has financial issues and refuses Glenn's offer of a loan, Courtney goes behind his back and takes it instead. When she falls behind on the repayments, Glenn blackmails her into smuggling drugs for him during her trip to Magaluf with the McQueen family. There, she is shocked that the person that she is delivering drugs to is Liam (now Jude Monk McGowan), who has been working with Glenn since leaving Hollyoaks. Back in Hollyoaks, Jesse proposes to Courtney, but she is caught returning the drugs to Glenn's office and she is arrested and Iona is temporarily given to her grandmother. Courtney teams up with Jesse and Liam's half-sister, Grace Black (Tamara Wall), and four other women (Farrah Maalik (Krupa Pattani), Kim Butterfield (Daisy Wood-Davis), Maxine Minniver (Nikki Sanderson) and Simone Loveday (Jacqueline Boatswain)) to end Glenn's reign of terror. The six women decide to kill him by all poisoning his drink so that they have shared responsibility. After his death, Liam targets the women and threatens to take Iona away from Courtney, but he is eventually persuaded by Jesse to stop. It is later revealed that Courtney and the other five women did not end up poisoning him after all, and he was actually killed by Breda McQueen (Moya Brady). Courtney allows Jesse to adopt Iona and is heartbroken when Leela's sister, Tegan Lomax (Jessica Ellis), dies in a storm.

Courtney is very happy when she finally marries Jesse. However, he dies on their wedding night of alcohol poisoning after binge-drinking, leaving her heartbroken. Liam offers to help with Iona but he also dies. Courtney later becomes good friends with John Paul McQueen (James Sutton) and suspects that his boyfriend George Kiss is abusing him. She supports John Paul after his death. Courtney supports Sid Sumner (Billy Price), who is struggling with becoming an amputee. Sid develops a crush on Courtney and kisses her, though she turns him down. She is suspended when he tells his friends that the pair had sex, though the issue is resolved when he tells the truth. Courtney is then successful for a job as headteacher in Scotland and has to leave right away. Sid and Grace try to convince her to stay but eventually give her their blessing. Courtney then says goodbye to her friends and leaves with Iona. Two years later, Courtney takes in Grace's son Curtis Royle when she is sent to prison.

== Reception ==
For her role as Courtney, Conachan was longlisted for "Best Actress" at the British Soap Awards in 2018. Conachan's mother tried to get people to vote for Conachan for the award. Reflecting on the reception that she received, Conachan told The Sunday Post, "I get a lot of messages from people saying watching me makes them think they can do it too. It's lovely to hear. But I'd really like people to watch Hollyoaks and just think, 'I like her, she’s a good actress".

Following the announcement of Conanchan's casting, Harry Fletcher from Digital Spy wrote that it "looks like Hollyoaks has a new star in its midst". Regarding Courtney's introduction, Fletcher's colleague Daniel Kilkelly called Courtney "no-nonsense" and speculated that she would cause trouble for Cameron as she "might be the one to finally uncover his many crimes". Kilkelly noted how Courtney was "Blissfully unaware" that Lockie is dead, but was thankful that Courtney would make some friends in the village and believed that this would prove useful for the Lomax family. Nicole Douglas from OK! wrote that she could not wait to see how Courtney's initial storyline involving Cameron would unfold. Sophie Dainty from Digital Spy called Courtney "fiesty" and believed that she should "[w]atch out" if she were to take on Cameron. Dainty also called Courtney's interrogation of Cameron regarding Lockie's whereabouts an "exciting plot" and believed that it was "about time" that Cameron was put on edge.

Sophie Dainty from Digital Spy wrote that the "pressure really is on for Cameron now" following Courtney making Lockie a Missing person's page, and questioned what "measures" Lockie would go to "silence" Courtney due to her refusal to stop her mission to find Lockie. Her colleague, Daniel Kilkelly, noted how Courtney had "finally had enough" of Cameron getting angry and threatening at the mention of Lockie's body, and believed that Courtney's wonder about why Lockie's body was not being released was a very "good question". Kilkelly also believed that it was understandable that Courtney wanted to have a funeral for Lockie when she found that he was dead. In November 2016, Kilkelly speculated that Courtney could be the one to catch Cameron, calling her "Strong-willed, curious and moralistic". Kilkelly noted that Courtney had been a "thorn in Cameron's side" since her debut, and added, "With her storyline so closely linked to Cameron's at the moment, it'd be a big surprise if Courtney wasn't involved with his downfall further on down the line. Could she be 2016's answer to Lynsey Nolan and become the village's next serial killer hunter extraordinaire? The clues are all there and she's smarter than most of the locals, so we wouldn't rule her out from cracking this case". When Courtney discovers Celine's body with Tegan, Kilkelly called her "Quick-thinking" when she tried to call the police and wrote that he did not "fancy her chances" of reasoning with Cameron. He also speculated whether Cameron would kill Courtney and Tegan to stop them from reporting Celine's death.

Regarding Courtney's pregnancy, Kilkelly speculated over what challenges would occur over Courtney's contemplation to becoming a single mother. Kilkelly also called Courtney "straight-talking" and hoped that her next meeting with Nancy would be more friendly. In November 2017, Kilkelly noted how Jesse and Tegan's romance hopes depended on whether she listens to Granny Campbell, Glenn or Tegan. Kilkelly believed that Courtney and Jesse's refusal to be honest with each other about their feelings allowed Glenn and Granny Campbell to put their plan into action. He also believed that Granny went too far in taking away Courtney's wheelchair. Kilkelly later called Jesse and Courtney "two kind-hearted characters" and wrote that Iona's birth was the night that Courtney's life changed. Kilkelly was also grateful that Jesse was not deterred easily following Granny throwing his gift in the bin. Kilkelly called Courtney's meeting with Liam in Magaluf "tense" and believed that Courtney was looking "very shifty" during the holiday. He added that Goldie was right to suspect that Courtney and Liam's "shady reunion can only spell trouble for more reason than one". Kilkelly noted that Courtney had been branded a "love cheat" by Goldie.

Duncan Lindsay from Metro wrote that Christmas 2017 would be a "Christmas to remember" for Courtney and speculated whether Granny would return and ruin her romance with Jesse. Following Iona's birth, Rianne Houghton from Digital Spy wrote that "it seems as though all is right for the Campbells at the moment" due to Courtney and Jesse admitting their feeling for each other. After Conachan hinted that Courtney would have darker scenes with her grandmother, Houghton asked, "Isn't anyone allowed to catch a break in soapland?"

Dainty from Digital Spy called Courtney being manipulated by her grandmother into thinking she has post-natal depression a "heartbreaking twist" and "devastating". Susannah Alexander from the same website reported how fans were "fuming" and "pretty angry" at Granny's manipulation of "poor Courtney", with viewers expressing their anger on Twitter following the scenes where Courtney asks her grandmother to be Iona's guardian. In contrast, Alexander's colleague Joe Anderton reported ow fans were rejoicing on social media after Courtney stood up to her grandmother and told her to "do one", with Anderton writing that that week of Hollyoaks had "got off to a great start" due to Granny getting her comeuppance.

In August 2018, Beth Allcock from OK! noted how viewers were "outraged" and "left as aghast" as Courtney when Granny returned and took Iona away, with some viewers expressing sympathy for Courtney on social media. Sophie Dainty from Digital Spy called Courtney being manipulated by Glenn a "dark twist" and believed that Courtney's actions had come back to haunt her. Sarah Ellis from Inside Soap later wrote that she was glad that Courtney had joined the WAGs to help bring Glenn down and joked that her science knowledge could be "useful"; she also noted how Courtney, like most Hollyoaks fans, could not "bear the thought of Glenn hanging around much longer". Kilkelly called Courtney and the other WAGs' decision to all kill Glenn together an ""Agatha Christie-esque twist", whilst Cryer noted that viewers enjoyed the teaming up of Courtney with the other WAGs and some had asked if they could team up against other villains.

Kilkelly noted how Courtney never appeared to be defined by her disability. Joe Anderton from Digital Spy wrote that Courtney's wedding had "earth-shattering drama". Susannah Alexander from Digital Spy called Courtney "Caring" for supporting Sid with pursuing his career. Patterson called Courtney's "sad" departure scenes one of Conachan's "finest performances ever" and wrote "No, you're crying!" and "Say it ain't so!" in reference to Courtney's exit. Patterson also called Courtney a "popular character".
