= Grace Black =

Fictional character from Hollyoaks

- Hollyoaks character
- Portrayed by: Tamara Wall
- Duration: 2013–2025
- First appearance: 8 November 2013
- Last appearance: 22 October 2025
- Introduced by: Bryan Kirkwood (2013); Hannah Cheers and Angelo Abela (2024)
- Spin-off appearances: Hollyoaks Later (2020)
- Crossover appearances: Brookside (2025)
In-universe information
- Other names: Grace Royle; Grace Roscoe
- Occupation: Club manager and owner Bar owner
- Father: Fraser Black
- Mother: Tracey Donovan
- Stepfather: Glenn Donovan
- Stepmother: Sandy Roscoe
- Sisters: Clare Devine
- Half-brothers: Rex Gallagher; Adam Donovan; Liam Donovan; Jesse Donovan; Ro Hutchinson (adoptive)
- Half-sisters: Dee Dee Hutchinson
- Husband: Trevor Royle (2016); Freddie Roscoe (2024–2026)
- Sons: Rex Gallagher; Curtis Royle
- Stepsons: Dylan Jenkins
- Stepdaughters: Lexi Roscoe
- Grandfathers: Froggy Black
- Uncles: Connor "Sully" Sullivan
- Nieces: Iona Campbell; Tori Devine-Banks (adoptive)

Grace Black (also Roscoe) is a fictional character from the British soap opera Hollyoaks, played by Tamara Wall. The character made her first on-screen appearance on 8 November 2013. Wall had three auditions for the role on the show's set in Liverpool. The character is introduced as the older sister of Clare Devine (Gemma Bissix), who had supposedly been killed-off in earlier episodes. Grace arrives to investigate her death and get reacquainted with her estranged father Fraser Black (Jesse Birdsall).

Grace's characterisation initially played her as a ruthless gangster. The character received an extensive character development from Hollyoaks' executive producer Bryan Kirkwood and his team. He believed he had let Wall down with Grace's original characterisation. Focusing on the character's personality and style, he and Wall transformed her from a gangster who fought for "bags of money" to a more family oriented woman fighting for "love and loyalty". Production also created a unique style for the character with long acrylic nails and black suits. They later gave Grace a big bouffant hair style, that became a trademark of the character and gave her a bigger personality. Her introductory storyline focused on her damaged relationship with Fraser. He was soon killed-off in a "whodunit" storyline, which placed Grace as a main suspect. Writers also created a long-term relationship for Grace alongside Trevor Royle (Greg Wood) and their relationship was centric to the character's storyline for three years. Grace gained a best friend in Esther Bloom (Jazmine Franks) and writers used the friendship to transform Grace into a more likeable character with viewers.

The character has been involved in many of the show's stories of her time. She has portrayed numerous kidnappings, fights, feuds and stunts. She has feuded with Mercedes McQueen (Jennifer Metcalfe), Big Bob (Vincent Ebrahim), Joe Roscoe (Ayden Callaghan) and Freddie Roscoe (Charlie Clapham). She has been pushed from a balcony, held hostage, shot, electrocuted, nearly killed Joe with a wrecking ball and has also been stalked by her secret lover Kim Butterfield (Daisy Wood-Davis). Grace's storylines have been both topical and dramatic – her relationship with Trevor and Esther explored the issue of surrogacy, while her affair with Kim culminated in a dramatic car crash stunt. In 2016, writers brought about the end of Grace's relationship with Trevor. They played Trevor having an affair with Sienna Blake (Anna Passey) and later being murdered by Sienna's teenage daughter, Nico Blake (Persephone Swales-Dawson), during his wedding to Grace. Producers then introduced Grace's extended family, consisting of three half-brothers, Adam (Jimmy Essex), Liam (Maxim Baldry/Jude Monk McGowan), and Jesse (Luke Jerdy), and their mother, Tracey (Lisa Maxwell). On 27 August 2025, it was revealed that Grace was sexually abused by her father Fraser in 1995, resulting in the birth of a son, Rex Gallagher (Jonny Labey).

Wall has received four award nominations for her portrayal of Grace, including one "Best Actress" nomination at the 2016 Inside Soap Awards. The character has been generally well received by critics of the genre. Wall has received praise for her performances of grief and others branded the character "ruthless". In 2023, executive producer Lucy Allan decided to axe Grace after Wall had played the character for a decade. Wall was rehired again in 2024 by new executive producer Hannah Cheers. Grace's return aired on 22 April 2024. Grace was killed-off in a previously unannounced departure on 22 October 2025 as part of Hollyoaks' 30th anniversary, after being shot and killed by her sister Clare. The very same episode Hollyoaks crossed over with Brookside.

== Casting ==
Wall attended three auditions for the role. Her first was on the Hollyoaks set in Liverpool, where she also acted out some scenes alongside regular cast members Jesse Birdsall and Greg Wood, who play Fraser Black and Trevor Royle respectively. On 24 October 2013, Wall's casting as Grace was made public. The actress had already begun filming with Hollyoaks and a promotional image was released of her in character. Grace was given immediate links with other characters in the show. She arrives wanting to investigate the death of her sister Clare Devine (Gemma Bissix). It was also revealed she would share screen time with her father Fraser and his bodyguard Trevor. The character made her first on-screen appearance on 8 November 2013.

== Development ==
=== Characterisation ===
==== Personality ====
Grace Black is as strong as New Years Day coffee and she manages to turn heads wherever she goes. But don't be fooled – her smile is a mask and her perfectly manicured nails are claws in disguise (and are just as sharp)! Fierce, ruthless and dangerous – it's easy to see how Grace is the only gangster left standing in the Black family.

— An excerpt from Grace's biography on the Channel 4 website.

Grace has been compared to a chameleon in her official character biography. This is because of her complex personality and differing attitudes depending on the type of characters that are sharing scenes with her. Grace behaves in an aggressive manner, has a ruthless mentality and can be a dangerous character to be around. For instance Grace's customers and acquaintances sometimes view her as "bubbly and warm". Though her close family and friends are more accustomed to a "cold, hard-nosed and uncompromising" nature – but the character does process a "true soft side".

In 2013, Wall told Daniel Kilkelly from Digital Spy that Grace is "pretty rock hard" and her childhood left her damaged emotionally. Fraser paid more attention to Clare and left Grace to fend for herself. Wall explained that "she was the strong one and quite tomboy-ish. Grace now spends her whole life putting on a front that you don't ever mess with her. But behind closed doors, she secretly wants to be quite girly – although she'd never, ever show that!" Grace enjoys being involved in a criminal life style. She wants to prove to her father she can "handle herself in a man's world". She likes to have power over other people and use it to her advantage. Wall has said that Grace is "clever", "two-faced" and "sly" and different to her sister Clare.

Tamara Wall was cast as Grace.

In July 2014, executive producer Bryan Kirkwood announced that he had planned to change Grace's characterisation. He told Kilkelly that "I acknowledge that we didn't get Grace's character right at first and I feel I let Tamara Wall down." He was pleased with Wall's performance as Grace and was eager to explore other aspects of the character's personality. Kirkwood's team put much work into further developing Grace and allowing Wall to bring warmth to her on-screen counterpart's persona. Writers used an existing character, Esther Bloom (Jazmine Franks) and made her Grace's best friend and "very surprising sidekick". Kirkwood believed it would throw Grace into a non-criminal world and see her behave different, smile more, show a softer side and offer the audience a chance to witness "other facets to her character." Kirkwood later reflected that the changes had given her family, friends and "a great big beating heart". He remained committed to Grace doing bad deeds but hoped her development made the audience care about her more.

In 2015, Writers played Grace trying to change her behaviour in preparation for motherhood. This added to the character's likeability with fans but Wall also wanted to keep Grace's dangerous side prevalent. She stated "I like the fact that she's more likeable now, but it's much more fun playing her as a baddie. As long as I get to walk through the village with a buggy in one hand and a gun in the other – I'll be happy!"

The actress later reflected on Grace's transformation. She told Ellie Hooper from Closer that Grace was a "one dimensional" character when she debuted. She observed a "big old change" and viewers could finally see her heart amongst the evil. She became friendlier as a result of mothering Curtis and writers ensured Grace had more comedy about her character. She dreams of a normal life even though it is not achievable for her given her past. She can be "a little bit of a freak" in her pursuit of the perfect family life, but ultimately Wall believed Grace would never get her "happily ever after". Wall enjoyed the complexities of Grace, adding "the best thing about her is that I still get to be the big evil baddie who's not very nice, but at the same time, I get to be funny and I get to have a love story." Kirkwood later said that the newly family oriented Grace "will be fighting for love and loyalty rather than bags of money."

==== Style ====
"There's a new scene stealer over in Hollyoaks. Bold, brassy, and utterly eclipsing everyone else in view – we are of course talking about Grace's bonkers new barnet!"

— Sarah Ellis from Inside Soap on Grace's hairstyle.

The character's style was originally an attire resembling formal wear consisting of a black suit and blazer. Her hair was initially styled basic and flat. The look achieved is that of a gangster moll. The character had large false nails to and these became a part of her early signature look. Wall explained that the nails were acrylic and she was required to wear them permanently. It took her time to adjust to wearing them but later felt strange without them. Wall branded it a trademark of the character that brightened up her black outfits. They also add to her strength as they have been as a weapon in "cat-fights". Production like Grace to wear pink nail varnish and this later became another distinctive trait of hers. The character wears eye make-up consisting of smoked out pencil kohl liner and several coats of black mascara. She is consistently styled in a range of blouses, some of which were purchased from real high street stores.

The Hollyoaks wardrobe department aim to dress their characters to reflect their financial earnings. Grace earns a considerable amount of money in her line of work. Therefore, she is one of the shows most expensive characters to supply clothing for. When Wall is required to appear on-screen undressed she has to have a scar applied to her stomach. This was to accurately depict the scar tissue on the entry-point of a gun shot wound she endured on-screen.

Producers later made a series of changes to Grace's characterisation. Her style changed and they introduced a new hairstyle, which has been described as an "enormous bouffant hair-do". Wall was happy with the changes because it helped develop Grace. She told an Inside Soap reporter that "as soon as I got this big hair, I felt the character get bigger. She strutted about more, and it brought a bit of comedy to her." The actress has admitted that it took time for her make-up team to perfect Grace's look. She was unhappy with Grace's shot in the Hollyoaks opening title sequence because the hair was not big enough. But over time she began to leave the make-up department with almost square hair as it grew. Wall is supplied with an additional hair piece which is applied to her head each morning. It takes the make-up department two hours daily to wash, dress and curl it and an additional forty minutes to style it onto Wall's head. Grace's hair is very big and is often seen with differing styles, but always with plenty of volume in the roots to achieve her signature look. The hair style became known as "Beryl Bouffant" on the Hollyoaks set. The hair got so big that directors would sometimes complain that it was blocking views of other characters during filming.

==== Backstory and introduction ====
In the character's backstory, Fraser raised Grace and Clare as a single parent. He put his efforts into raising Clare, believing Grace was adept to look after herself. Their mother had walked out on them to escape Fraser's criminal life and started a new family. Fraser also raised Trevor but he had become romantically involved with Clare and got her pregnant. Grace secretly had feelings for Trevor too. Grace and Clare did not get along with each other. When Clare died it made Grace reflect on the relationship and realise she loved her sister. But Grace is upset that she never told her how she felt. This is the main motive Grace has in wanting revenge against her killer.

Hollyoaks had a long-running theme of having a "dark gangster corner of the show" first created with the character Scott Anderson (Daniel Hyde). Grace was brought into the show to fill that role of the gangster running The Loft night club. When Grace arrives in the village she is determined to find out the truth behind Clare's death. She knows Doctor Browning (Joseph Thompson) killed her sister in a hit and run incident and wants revenge. She notices Lindsey Butterfield (Sophie Austin) and Cindy Cunningham (Stephanie Waring) behaving suspiciously and begins to monitor them. She also confronts Mercedes McQueen (Jennifer Metcalfe) about Clare. Grace does not realise the three characters are covering up the murder of Doctor Browning. Lindsey becomes suspicious of Grace as soon as they meet. Austin told Daniel Kilkelly from Digital Spy that "Grace is quite intimidating. Considering her relations, I don't think she's going to be the nicest of characters." She also has a problematic relationship with Fraser because she believes that he loved Clare more. The show began to develop Grace's first feud storyline for Grace with Mercedes. When Mercedes receives Doctor Browning's life insurance money she flaunts her wealth in the village. This infuriates Grace and her hatred for Mercedes grows. She visits Trevor and makes it clear she intends to get revenge.

Grace's first feud with another gangster was quickly deployed on-screen. Ray McCormick (Cristian Solimeno) was introduced as an enemy of the Black family and targets Grace specifically. He kidnaps Grace, locks her away and demands ransom money in exchange for Grace's safety. Trevor becomes determined to secure her release and concocts a scam to steal Mercedes' money. Ray then dresses as Father Christmas and attends Fraser's wedding to Sandy Roscoe (Gillian Taylforth). He leaves a note for Fraser to aggravate him about his missing daughter's whereabouts.

Writers soon escalated the feud into violence. Grace escapes and Trevor begins a scam selling counterfeit wine. Ray becomes annoyed with Trevor gaining more business and decides to vengefully target Grace once again. She visits Clare's grave and Ray organises to have her badly beaten and left for dead. Fraser decides to convince Trevor that Ray killed his father. He knows Trevor will try and kill Ray as a result. A Hollyoaks publicist stated that "all hell is set to break loose and these episodes are not to be missed."

=== Fraser's lies and murder ===
Grace's relationship with Fraser is made more complicated when he reveals that he has fathered a child with Tegan Lomax (Jessica Ellis). She decides to interfere with his personal life. Grace befriends Tegan who is initially wary of Grace. She pretends to want her half-sister, Rose, in her life, to which Tegan agrees. She invites Tegan on a day out in the countryside. Grace then attempts to bribe Tegan with money to leave the village for good. Ellis told Kilkelly that her character is shocked by Grace's behaviour and refuses to leave. She added "if there's an issue, it's one that Grace needs to sort out with her dad. Tegan isn't having any of it." This infuriates Grace who threatens her over the edge of a cliff. Ellis said that Tegan realises what Grace is capable of and is terrified of being killed. Ellis and Wall filmed the cliff-top scenes on a cold and rainy day. Wall was scared that she would accidentally push her co-star off the cliff.

Hollyoaks created a "Whodunit" storyline in which Fraser is murdered. Grace was a suspect because her relationship with Fraser deteriorated because of her involvement with Trevor. Fraser believed that they betrayed him and was considering having them killed. Tyler from Inside Soap reported that Grace realises she will be killed unless she take her own father out first.

Sandy's son Joe Roscoe (Ayden Callaghan) is determined to get Fraser out of the Roscoe family. He asks Trevor for help killing Fraser, who then brings Grace in on their plan. Grace is happy to oblige having fallen out with her father. Fraser and Sandy plan to travel by limousine to a special event. Grace, Trevor and Joe plan to lock Fraser in the vehicle and release poisonous gas to kill him. Grace betrays Joe and plans to frame him solely for the crime and also ensure Sandy dies too. The plot does go ahead but when Joe realises Sandy is in the limousine he rescues them from death.

Fraser is later shot dead and Grace is genuinely angry and upset. She is left with Fraser's business and finances after his death. This makes other characters suspicious of her, believing she planned his murder for financial gain. Grace is a main suspect in the police investigation. Wall said "right after Fraser is killed, Grace is on the warpath to try and blame someone for the crime." She wants to frame Tegan for the murder but later discovers a bag of clothes in Trevor's flat which leads her to believe he killed Fraser. Grace has him arrested, the actress reflected that it "is awful, not only has she lost her dad, she's lost the love of her life." Trevor is released when Mercedes comes forward as his alibi, revealing they were having sex when Fraser was killed. Grace then becomes convinced Ste Hay (Kieron Richardson) killed him. She kidnaps Ste and tries to force a confession out of him. Freddie Roscoe (Charlie Clapham) was later revealed to be Fraser's murderer to protect his family. Wood concluded that the story affected Grace's development. He told Kilkelly that "the big thing for Grace has been finding out about her dad's very dark side, as he completely denied her any love. Grace's life has been turned upside down as well."

=== Wrecking ball stunt ===
One of Grace's first big stories was announced in December 2013. Grace threatens Freddie telling him that she will harm someone close to him if he does not kill Mercedes for her. He refuses and Grace follows through with her plan. Kilkelly (Digital Spy) reported that Hollyoaks had created a dramatic stunt involving a wrecking ball and a demolition of their council housing set. They added that Grace would trap a character in the disused flats ready for them to be killed in the demolition. Freddie's brother Joe was later revealed to be Grace's target. Hollyoaks released promotional pictures of the character being showered with debris from the demolition.

Holloaks led viewers to believe that Joe had been killed off in the scenes. Fraser involved himself to ensure Grace was not reprimanded for the crime. He tells Grace that Joe died in the demolition and he disposed of the body. Writers played Grace being guilt ridden in the weeks of episodes that followed the stunt. Fraser decides to bring Grace in on a secret to ease her guilt. The show aired surprise scenes in which Fraser takes Grace to a private hospital where Joe is alive, but comatose and being cared for. Grace and Fraser were tasked with keeping Joe's location a secret after everyone believes he left the village. Joe's mother Sandy nearly discovers the secret after Fraser is careless. Then Joe wakes from his coma and Grace considers killing Joe to protect her freedom. Joe fakes amnesia and manages to escape from hospital. It soon becomes clear he has not lost any memories from the incident. Callaghan told Laura-Jayne Tyler from Inside Soap that "he remembers pretty much everything that happened to him at the hands of Grace." He added that he wants to protect his mother Sandy, from the Black family now he knows about their crimes.

Grace is arrested for the attempted murder of Joe and the case is sent to trial. Mercedes and Freddie become invested in watching Grace to make sure she does not get away with it. Grace is confident she will be found not guilty at the trial. Writers played the story to convey Grace having similar power to Fraser. Wall told Laura Withers of Inside Soap that her character has the "judge in her pocket" and pays to fix the trial. She explained that Grace uses skills learned from her father. Fraser taught her that people in power can be paid off. Mercedes discovers Grace's plan and attempts to ruin it. Wall claimed the story showed that Grace appears strong but is "actually prettified" about going to prison. The character avoids a prison sentence when the trial concludes.

=== Feud with Freddie Roscoe ===
Grace has a prominent feud with the character Freddie Roscoe. Freddie manages to secure his release after he receives a false alibi. Grace knows the alibi is false and is furious that Freddie has evaded justice. Wall told Withers that "Grace has been bent on revenge ever since she found out that Freddie killed her dad." She was willing to forget her vendetta on the condition Freddie was sent to prison. But his release makes Grace "see red" and she wants a "showdown" with her nemesis. The actress said that at this point in the story Trevor is fed up with Grace and Freddie's feud. He issues an ultimatum that if she wants to start a family, she must leave Freddie alone. Grace ignores Trevor's warnings and she goes to confront him at her night club where they brawl on the outside balcony. Writers included a "deadly turn" in the story, where there fight escalates and Freddie knocks Grace over the balcony and she falls to the ground. Wall said that writers made in unclear to her whether Freddie did it intentionally or accidentally, but noted "it would certainly make life easier for Freddie if Grace were dead." Hollyoaks hired a stunt double during filming as they could not expect Wall to perform a 12-foot fall.

Grace has to become secretive about her revenge plans as not to upset Trevor who wants a normal family life. Wall commented "It's a bit of a tough situation for Grace, because she's stuck in the middle. She could either be the baddie and get revenge, or she could turn her back, let bygones be bygones and be a family woman."

Grace decides on a new revenge plot against Freddie. Mercedes disappears in mysterious circumstances and the police believe she has been murdered when they find traces of her blood. Flashback scenes aired revealed Grace was behind Mercedes' disappearance and she sets out to frame Freddie for her murder. She plant evidence in Freddie's flat so that he is arrested. Hollyoaks had been secretive about whether or not Mercedes had been killed by Grace. In February 2015, Mercedes reappeared on-screen in surprise scenes and it was revealed she had teamed up with Grace to frame Freddie for her supposed murder. The character had been hiding in a villa in France while Grace set Freddie up. Freddie's girlfriend Lindsey discovers the truth and sends Grace threatening messages to expose her deceit. Grace manages to fool the police investigation until Phoebe McQueen (Mandip Gill) incriminates herself into becoming the prime suspect for the supposed murder. With the plan ruined Mercedes later returns to the village.

Hollyoaks released a promotional trailer of new storylines which featured Grace holding Freddie at gun point. Digital Spy's Kilkelly reported that the story would bring Grace's feud with Freddie to an end. In addition they released pictures showing that Joe would also gain control of the gun and aim it at his estranged brother Freddie. Grace's motivation for wanting to kill Freddie comes from a series of events in which Kim ruins her relationship with Trevor and Esther. Clapham told Laura Withers (Inside Soap) that his character is "paralysed with fear" over Grace. He knows that Grace "has nothing to lose" now and may well kill him. When the scenes played out Joe manages to obtain the gun and tries to shoot Freddie. He misses but the stray bullet hits Phoebe who later dies.

=== Relationship with Trevor Royle ===
Hollyoaks created Grace's first relationship storyline alongside Trevor. The plot commenced on-screen December 2013 when the duo kissed for the first time. Grace becomes jealous of Trevor charming Mercedes in his attempts to con her. When Trevor confronts her jealous behaviour Grace admits she has romantic feelings for him and they get together. Grace and Trevor's relationship is forbidden by disapproving Fraser, and they see each other in secret. Freddie discovers their romance and tells Fraser about their betrayal. Wood told Kilkelly (Digital Spy) that it is love between Grace and Trevor "but in this murky world that they live in, they're not being able to fully express that love." He said that it was a difficult situation for his character. He wants to keep out of prison so he can be with her. Wood described the relationship as a first for Trevor because he deeply cares and loves Grace unlike his previous romances.

Wall hoped that Grace and Trevor would become the show's "new power couple". She wanted them to have a similar relationship to Den (Leslie Grantham) and Angie Watts (Anita Dobson), a well known married couple from the rival soap opera EastEnders. Though she noted "Grace and Trevor are far more evil", her character believes her relationship is "the real deal" and Trevor is the only man she cares about. Grace's influence on Trevor is positive and allowed writers to showcase his "soft side". When sharing scenes the pair can be shown as quite pleasant characters, Wall said it "makes them more likeable, even though they are both baddies." Fans of Hollyoaks labelled the couple "Trace" and the actress believed the relationship helped viewers warm to her character.

According to Wood his character had long hankered for a sense of normality that other characters on the show have. He said that finding love had changed his character's priorities. Grace had become Trevor's main focus and the gangster business played second. In one story, Grace has Trevor arrested for her father's murder. Wood believed that Trevor was understanding of the betrayal because she was grieving. He added that Trevor's understanding was the reason they were able to move on in their relationship.

Grace wants to begin a family but her doctor informs her the chances are low because of injuries sustained by a gun shot. She decides to try IVF treatment in order to conceive. She tells Trevor she wants to focus on a future that does not involve crime. Wall told an Inside Soap reporter that "Grace doesn't want to be evil any more." She noted that Trevor had long wanted to change but Grace was "more stubborn about it". When Grace announced her intention to have IVF, Trevor is delighted. Wall said it was a "cute" moment for the couple because they are so happy.

In 2015, producers built Grace and Trevor's family unit by introducing his son Dylan Jenkins (James Fletcher). His arrival sends their lives into disarray but Grace does try and make an effort with him. She agrees to go to his school parents evening, but dresses inappropriately. In comedic scenes Dylan is embarrassed by Grace's revealing outfit which attracts the attention of male students who begin wolf-whistling at her. Wall said "lets face it, Grace and Trevor are not your average parents, are they?"

Writers plagued the duo with more relationship dramas such as Grace's affair with Kim and the introduction of Trevor's ex-girlfriend and Dylan's mother, Val Jenkins (Tanya Robb). When Grace makes a harsh comment regarding the death of Phoebe, Trevor is furious and they argue. Val uses the opportunity to spend time with Trevor helping him with house work. This makes Grace jealous, who views Val as a love-rival. Grace's concerns are proved correct Val kisses Trevor. Robb told an Inside Soap reporter that Val wants to give Dylan a "normal family life". She believed her character did not want to ruin Grace's relationship but thought it felt natural to try. Trevor does not reciprocate but Grace finds evidence of their kiss and it causes more problems for them. They also face another set back when Grace wrongly presumes Trevor has slept with Porsche McQueen (Twinnie-Lee Moore). Grace forces Trevor to take a lie detector test to prove his innocence. Wall said it was an example of her character behaving anxiously because she is about to achieve her dreams of a complete family. She does not want Trevor to ruin it by cheating, Wall added "She's probably quite worried all the time that he's going to go off with some beautiful, normal girl."

Trevor is arrested for a series of murders which occurred at the local hospital. He is wrongly accused as viewers knew that Lindsey was the serial killer, dubbed the "Gloved Hand Killer". Wall said her character knows Trevor better than anyone and knows he would not have committed these crimes. She sets out to prove his innocence but Lindsey is actively trying to frame Trevor. Wall likened Grace trying to complete a puzzle as she goes out to find clues that lead to the actual killer. Grace realises that Charlie Dean (Charlie Behan) knows something about the actual culprit. Wall said that Grace is true to form and behaves "very aggressive", kidnaps him and tries to force Charlie to talk.

=== Feud with Big Bob ===
Hollyoaks cast Vincent Ebrahim to play Big Bob, a villainous character created to cause conflict with Grace and Trevor. Big Bob arrives in the village to find Trevor and request a criminal favour. His arrival came at a time Grace wanted to begin IVF treatment. Wall told an Inside Soap reporter that Bib Bob's arrival meant "something pretty bad is going to happen". She added that it threw a "massive spanner in the works" and ruined Grace's attempts to move away from her life as a gangster. When Big Bob vandalises their home, Grace decides to force Lindsey into helping Big Bob smuggle a sim card into a nearby prison. As the plan failed, Big Bob wants revenge. Trevor finds a box with a lock of Grace's hair inside and then receives a threatening call from Big Bob. He tells Trevor he has kidnapped Grace and demands a £60000 ransom for her safe release. But Grace is okay and they discover that Big Bob has kidnapped Esther after mistaking her identity. Grace and Trevor go on a rescue mission which ends with Big Bob pointing a gun in Grace's face. The story was part of the show's continued theme of playing Grace in dangerous situations. A Hollyoaks publicist stated that it was "more than just bad luck" and warned that Grace has a bad track record with guns.

Big Bob later plan an armed robbery at the local hospital, targeting their medical supplies. The heist goes wrong and many characters end up held hostage in the hospital. Grace and Esther try to escape, but Esther collapses and goes into anaphylactic shock due to an allergic reaction to some antibiotics. Grace is tasked with saving Esther's life and correctly finds some adrenaline to save her life. Big Bob locates them and once again threatens Grace with a gun.

=== Friendship with Esther Bloom and surrogacy ===
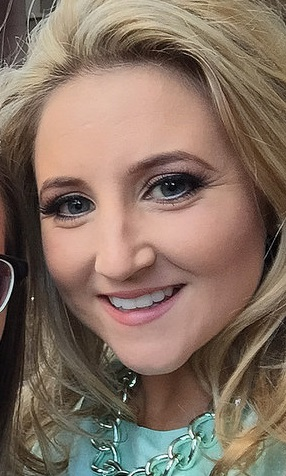
Jazmine Franks (pictured) plays Grace's best friend Esther Bloom.

After the siege Grace and Esther build a strong friendship. It was the relationship writers used to develop Grace's softer side. Wall viewed Grace and Esther's friendship as a completely "random" but "brilliant" pairing. She was happy with the progression of their friendly dynamic, which resulted in the two characters always looking after one another. The actress also believed it made both characters' stories take a "perfect" path. She also enjoyed working on the relationship because of Franks' funny personality.

Grace is told she cannot get pregnant and IVF is unlikely to help. She then shows an interest in Esther's health and her sudden concern makes Esther suspicious. Grace asks Esther to be a surrogate mother for her and tries to bully her into helping. When Grace leaves Esther alone she agrees to help. Grace, Trevor and Esther attend a meeting at the hospital to discuss their plans. The doctor informs Grace that Esther would be the child's legal mother, despite using Grace's egg. Grace is not fazed but Trevor has some reservations.

The surrogacy plan is successful and Esther becomes pregnant. Franks was surprised when producers pitched the storyline to her. She was happy to be trusted with the story and added that Esther is "too nice" and ultimately could not refuse to help Grace. The actress believed viewers that would have never imagined the three characters working together. Writers played scenes which sometimes threatened Grace's happiness. Early on in the pregnancy they created a medical scare for Esther. When she feels unwell Grace worries and rushes Esther to hospital. But after a check-up and scan the pregnancy is fine. Grace and Trevor witness Esther's ultrasound scan and see their baby for the first time. Wall said "it's lovely, it hits them that they're really going to have a child! There aren't very many warm moments in Grace and Trevor's lives, but this is definitely one of them."

Writers began developing a new romance for Esther while she carried Grace's child. Esther meets Kim Butterfield (Daisy Wood-Davis) who asks her on a date. Esther invites Grace along and Kim presumes they are in a relationship. Grace is privy to their misunderstanding and urges them to get together. Digital Spy's Kilkelly revealed that Grace would soon regret her decision. The character becomes worried that Esther and Kim's relationship will ruin their surrogacy deal. Grace tells Kim that Esther once tried to commit suicide to put Kim off. Esther confronts Grace when she realises that Kim has ended their relationship because of Grace's actions. Wall told Kilkelly that if Esther tried to keep the baby it would destroy their friendship. Esther gives birth to a baby boy named Curtis. She later bans Grace and Trevor from seeing the baby because of their behaviour. Franks defended her character's actions. She explained that Esther always knew the baby was for Grace but she has an unforeseen attachment to Curtis. Esther feels maternal to the baby and she had not expected it to happen when she first agreed to be a surrogate for Grace. Franks added that "she's scared that Trevor and Grace are not fit parents."

=== Kim Butterfield's obsession ===
Producers created an infidelity story for Grace with Kim. A promotional trailer followed which showcased Kim's behaviour intensifying when she begins a diary about her interaction with Grace. Wood-Davis told Daniel Kilkelly that Kim notes down each time Grace touches her and even logs their conversations. She also keeps a picture of Grace hidden in her bra. The actress admitted Kim quickly became obsessed with Grace because "really sets her heart racing and she can't get her out of her mind." She loves Esther but Grace brings danger into her life.

Grace is sent to prison awaiting trial for her involvement in the supposed murder of Mercedes. Wall explained that her character refused to tell the truth about Mercedes being alive. She fears Esther will back out of their surrogacy deal if she knows that she carried on her feud with Freddie against her wishes. Kim begins to miss Grace, Wood-Davis told Carena Crawford from All About Soap that Kim is "one determined woman" and makes it her mission to join Grace in prison. She believes Grace is the only one to make her feel complete. Kim knows it is unlikely she will get the chance to be with Grace. So when she enters prison she schemes against Grace's cellmate Reenie McQueen (Zöe Lucker), resulting in Kim being moved into Grace's cell. Wood-Davis said that it marked the first time Grace became unnerved by Kim's behaviour.

Wood-Davis viewed Kim and Grace as an "odd pairing and very unexpected" who bonded over their shared love of Esther. Grace is scared at the prospect of permanent imprisonment and feels vulnerable. She opens up to Kim about her deteriorating relationship with Trevor because she is someone familiar. But Kim uses this as an opportunity to seduce Grace who responds positively and the pair have sex. The development lead writers to play the Kim character even crazier over Grace, thinking she and Grace will be together upon their release from prison. Wood-Davis said Kim thinks "she's found a pot of gold at the end of the rainbow." Wall told Sally Brockway from Soaplife Grace does not realise "how insane Kim is". Their tryst makes Grace feel powerful and she does not have feelings for Kim. Wall added that Grace knows Kim is attracted to her and it makes her feel good while in prison and have a "power-trip". The story had potential to ruin Grace's life and she worries that Esther will not give the baby up. Grace realises that Kim has more power over Esther. She fakes feelings of love for Kim and manipulates her into ensuring Esther is committed to the surrogacy deal. Wall branded Grace's scheme a "dangerous game" because she knows that Kim is "pretty much insane". But noted that Grace has dealt with worse people in her past, "far freakier, weirder people than Kim."

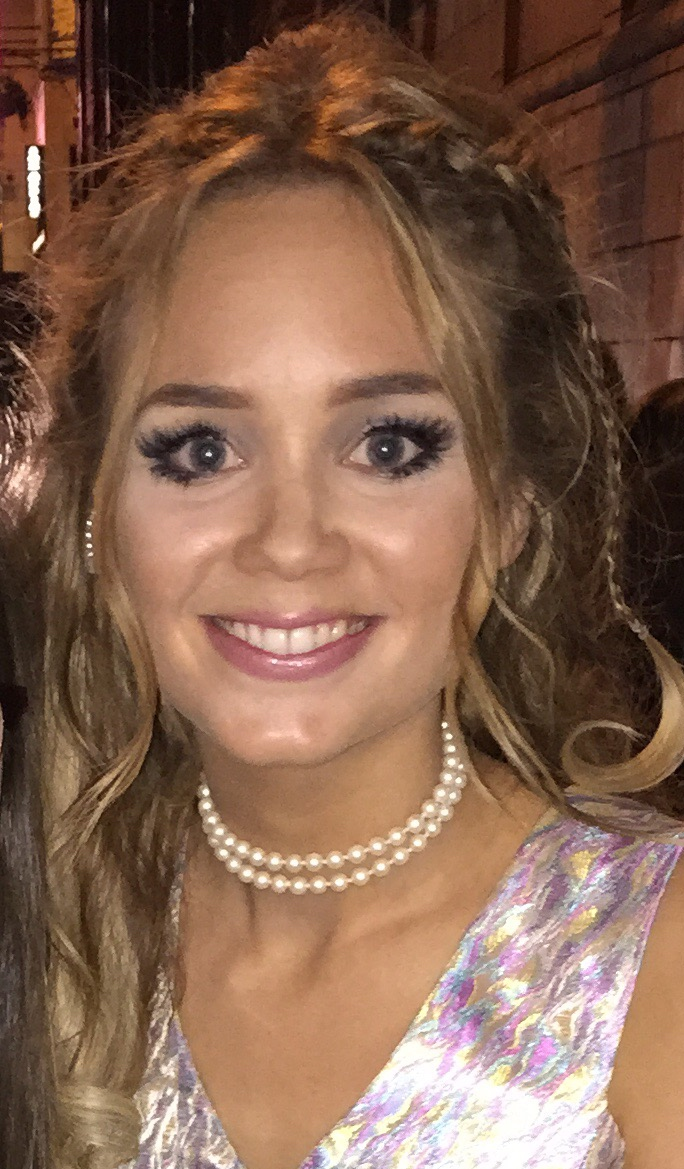
Daisy Wood-Davis (pictured) plays Kim Butterfield, the character who Grace begins an affair with.

Grace soon struggles to control Kim and remain in a relationship with Trevor. Wood-Davis told Sarah Ellis of Inside Soap that Kim wants revenge when she discovers Grace is still having sex with Trevor. She prints out hundreds of pictures of herself and Grace kissing and plasters them on the walls of Grace's nightclub. She manages to remove them before Trevor and Esther arrive. Grace confronts Kim and realises how unstable she has become. She decides to keep Kim happy and stops arguing and sleeps with her. However the pair are caught in bed together by Trevor's son Dylan. Grace's problems worsen when Kim turns on Esther and starts plotting against her. Wood-Davis explained "Kim reckons that once the baby is born, the two of them can run off into the sunset with the child." This results in Kim spiking Esther's drink with labour inducing drugs to gain her happy ending with Grace. Writers introduced Trevor into the story who decides to help Grace ride of Kim. He orders Robbie Roscoe (Charlie Wernham) to kill Kim but the plan fails and she refuses to leave. Esther discovers the truth about the affair, she refuses to forgive Grace and once again threatens that Grace will not be part of the surrogate child's life. Grace and Kim's affair resulted in Wood-Davis receiving angry comments on social media website Twitter. Fans expressed their support for "Trace" relationship and blamed Kim for trying to split them up.

=== Car crash stunt ===
Hollyoaks released a trailer with advance spoilers revealing that Kim would orchestrate a car chase amongst the escalated drama surrounding Esther's surrogacy. The car chase was filmed using stunt drivers placed on top of the vehicles and pod cameras attached to them. This allowed the actors to act as though they were driving the vehicle despite the stunt man being in control. The car which contains Kim and Esther was crashed using a police van which collides with it. The car crash stunt itself was filmed separate and actors were not required to be in the vehicles at that point. Real fire, smoke, fire engines and fire fighters were included in the scenes to help create an authentic scene of mayhem during the post-crash scenes. On-set Wood-Davis said that Kim "is the driving force of it really." She explained that Kim realised Grace did not want her and she decided to run off with Curtis in an act of revenge.

The storyline was played out on-screen following Esther giving birth to Grace's son, Curtis. Kim returns to the village and asks Esther to take Curtis and leave the village with her. She reveals that Trevor and Grace tried to kill her. Wood explained to Jonathon Hughes of All About Soap that Trevor cannot stand Kim and Grace's affair continuing any longer. He put a stop to it and this leads Kim too gain revenge by taking his son away from him. The character tries to trick Esther into believing Kim has left the village. Franks told Digital Spy's Kilkelly that Esther knows Trevor is lying and is the reason she agrees to take Curtis. Trevor and Grace follow Kim's car and a fast chase begins. But their erratic driving leads to a crash and Trevor arrives on the scene to save Curtis. But then Kim reverses her car which leads to another collision with a police van which leads to the death of Dylan, who was in the van. The car which contained Kim and Esther explodes following their escape.

Wall said the car crash stunt was her favourite storyline from Grace's tenure. She told Hooper (Closer) that "it was literally the most fun I've had whilst I've been here. It's Grace at her absolute maddest. When I watched it back and saw my facial expressions, I couldn't have looked any uglier if I tried! It's nice being outside on location and doing things that are a little bit different." She also believed that the crash and Dylan's subsequent death was "kind of Grace's fault". The crash was named one of "the best bits of August" in the Inside Soap Yearbook 2016.

=== Casual relationships ===
In 2015, the character spent an episodic block separated from Trevor. The pair break up because Trevor blames Grace for Dylan's death in the car crash stunt. During this time Hollyoaks writers began a casual sexual relationship between Grace and Darren Osborne (Ashley Taylor Dawson). When Grace and Esther repair their friendship, Esther develops romantic feelings towards her. It was reported by Digital Spy that Esther would have "fresh hope" of a romance with Grace when Darren ends their brief relationship. When Grace confides in Esther about her "disastrous love life", she sees the opportunity to reveal her feelings and surprises Grace with a kiss.

Grace and Esther begin a relationship but soon develop problems. Grace has second thoughts about being with Esther because she still loves Trevor. With Trevor in prison Esther feels confident their relationship can succeed. But Esther's happiness is short-lived when she finds Grace's old engagement ring. All About Soap's Laura Morgan reported that Grace would feel guilty and try to prove to Esther she has moved on from Trevor. But when Esther finds evidence to support Trevor was wrongly arrested for murder she is forced to hand the evidence to the police and secure his release. Writers brought the brief relationship to and end with Trevor's release.

=== Wedding and Trevor's death ===
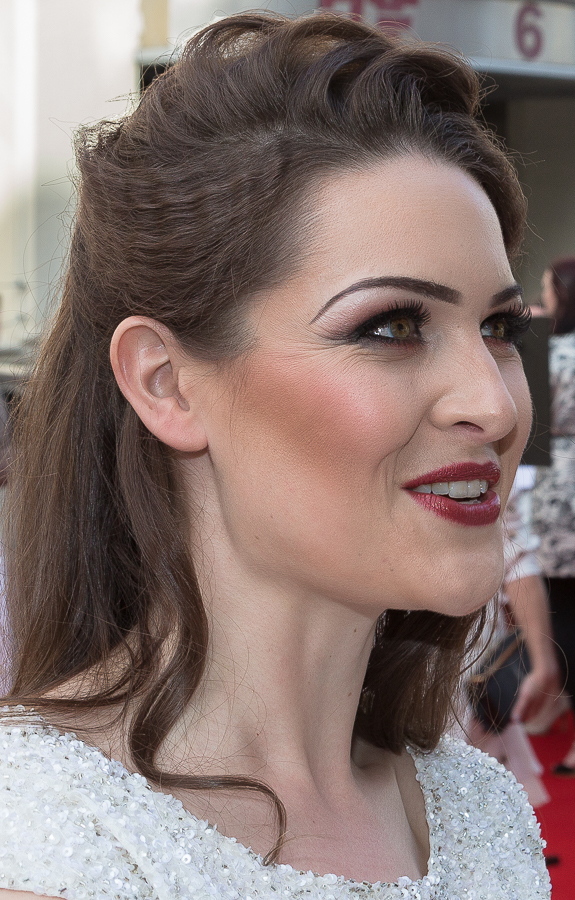
Anna Passey (pictured) plays Sienna Blake who is Grace's love rival in vying for Trevor's attentions.

Hollyoaks planned a wedding storyline for Grace and Trevor. When they reconcile on-screen the pair set about organising their nuptials. Writers also developed an affair storyline for Trevor and Sienna Blake (Anna Passey) to coincide with the wedding. The latter is due to marry Trevor's enemy Ben Bradley (Ben Richards). They visit each other in secret and concoct a plan to run away together. Kilkelly reported that Grace and Sienna's wedding preparations would see them turn into "bridezillas" clashing with one another over dresses. Viewers were divided over their support for each relationship as both pairing proved popular. Trevor and Sienna were given the fan worship name "Trienna" pitted against "Trace" fans.

Wall told Alison Gardner from What's on TV that Grace feels "jittery" in the days before her wedding because she is thinks Trevor is having an affair. Grace is terrified that she will be jilted. She described a pivotal scene in the story in which Grace and Trevor discuss her childhood dreams. Wall explained that Grace opens up about her wedding day being all she had ever dreamed of growing up. She also pleads with him to not ruin her day. British paparazzi had acquired photographs of on location filming which appeared to suggest a funeral for Trevor was imminent. The reports were accurate as Grace's wedding episode was broadcast. Trevor decides that he wants to be with Grace. Sienna's daughter Nico Blake (Persephone Swales-Dawson) discovered Trevor's affair. The murderess character is furious with Trevor for ruining her family unit with Ben. She approaches Trevor outside the church and stabs him before fleeing the scene. Trevor recalls his promise to not let Grace down on her wedding day. He gains composure, hides his stabbing wound and enters the church to complete the wedding ceremony. They manage to marry, but Trevor collapses and dies at the altar.

Grace is "grief-stricken" by Trevor's death and Ben tells police he murdered Trevor to protect Nico. Following his murder Grace refuses to take off her wedding dress and remains in it for several episodes. Filming Grace's grief was Wall's most challenging story during her tenure because it involved playing Grace "down" for prolonged time. She explained "the aftermath of Trevor's death was hard because it involved peeling back every layer of Grace, to the point where she had nothing. She didn't take her wedding dress off for a week!" The actress added that she was unsure Grace would ever discover Nico actually killed her husband.

Writers kept the affair secret until Trevor's funeral episode in which Sienna is exposed as his former lover. Grace angrily confronts Sienna about the betrayal. This ignited a new feud storyline which writers continued to explore over the months of episodes that followed. When Grace later discovers a portrait of Sienna that Trevor drew, it reignites her hatred towards Sienna.

=== Introduction of family ===
In 2016, producers created an extended family for Grace. First they cast the roles of half-brothers Liam (Maxim Baldry), Jesse (Luke Jerdy) and Adam Donovan (Jimmy Essex). It was revealed that on-screen Grace would not be happy with them being in her life again. During the casting process the three actors had to complete a day long acting workshop with Wall. They conversed about Grace's history within Hollyoaks to help with their introduction to the show. Liam is introduced to the show first. Grace is annoyed when she notices him and gives him money to leave the village for good.

Esther decides that Grace needs family support following Trevor's murder. She decides to invite the Donovans to visit Grace. When they arrive she orders them to leave, but they persist on staying. Jerdy told Laura Heffernan (Inside Soap) that ultimately Grace views them as her "little annoying brothers" who have never had any time for her. They give her a cosmetic make-over and begin to lift her mood. Liam and Jesse soon plot to steal Trevor's life insurance to repay money they owe Adam. Jerdy told Kilkelly that Jesse and Liam were influenced by Adam's estranged relationship with Grace. They had a problematic dynamic and his negative stories about Grace clouded their judgement. Jerdy believed that Jesse feels guilty about the scam because he is the first brother to care about Grace. He noted that Liam has a "colder" personality and does not feel any remorse for trying to scam his sister.

In August 2016, it was announced that Lisa Maxwell had joined the cast of Hollyoaks in the role of Grace's mother Tracey. The character was billed as a "train wreck" who has had a difficult life. Her relationship with Grace is difficult and they are estranged. Maxwell had to have a "make-under" to make her appear older. This was to add realism because of the mere thirteen year age gap between Wall and Maxwell. Grace's resentment for Tracey began when she left her two daughters in the care of Fraser. Grace and Clare were brought up in a world of "crime and corruption" that came with Fraser. But Tracey remarried and brought up Adam, Jesse, and Liam with different values. A publicist for the show stated "Tracey adds an interesting dynamic to the Donovans. Lisa enjoyed filming and bosses think the audience will love her scenes with Tamara."

=== Departure and return ===
In July 2023, Wall confirmed that she had been axed from Hollyoaks after ten years in the role of Grace, with her final scenes airing shortly afterwards. Wall revealed that executive producer Lucy Allan decided to write Grace out of the show. On 24 March 2024, it was announced that Wall had reprised the role of Grace, and would be returning that year. Wall's rehiring followed the appointment of a new executive producer, Hannah Cheers.

== Reception ==
For her portrayal of Grace, Wall was nominated in the "Best Bitch" category at the 2014 Inside Soap Awards. At the 2016 ceremony, she was nominated for "Funniest Female" and "Best Actress". She and Wood gained a "Best Partnership" nomination for their work on Grace and Trevor's relationship. In August 2017, Wall was longlisted for Best Bad Girl at the Inside Soap Awards. She made the viewer-voted shortlist, although lost out to Gillian Kearney, who portrays Emma Barton in Emmerdale. Grace's death was longlisted for "Best Exit" at the 2026 Inside Soap Awards.

Daniel Kilkelly (Digital Spy) described Grace as a "no-nonsense and strong-minded businesswoman" with a penchant for kidnapping people. The critic praised Hollyoaks writers for the "stroke of genius" pairing Grace and Trevor. He opined that they had "irresistible chemistry" and "fans unexpectedly found themselves rooting for the show's resident criminal couple." He later branded her the "ruthless" and "fearsome Hollyoaks gangster Grace Black." Their colleague Phoebe Roy said that the "grandest day-glo fembot" mellowed after she became a mother, but did retain "some of her old fury". They likened the addition of marriage and motherhood onto Grace was "like de-clawing a mighty lion – even her hair is smaller."

Penny McGuire from What's on TV branded Grace the "village bad girl" and a fellow writer from the magazine labelled her a "ruthless" character. Jess Denham of The Independent reported that Hollyoaks sometimes gets labelled "too gay" by viewers because of their many sexuality related storylines, citing Grace seducing Kim for personal gain as an example. Carena Crawford from All About Soap questioned whether or not the character was stupid. She noted that Grace fell for Kim's scheming and warned her to steer clear of the character. She later praised Wall's performance alongside Passey. She enjoyed watching their characters, Grace and Sienna fight. They also expressed their want of a reformed friendship between the two and gave them the portmanteau "Grienna".

A writer from Inside Soap liked the extremes Grace went to in order to destroy Esther's wedding. They added "You have to hand it to Grace Black, she doesn't do things by half." They also "rooted" for the character to win the feud with Freddie and observed that she walks around Hollyoaks village "like she owns it". Michael Cregan from the publication enjoyed Hollyoaks portraying a "softer side" to Grace during the hospital siege story. But the writer had become bored of Grace being nice to Esther, and were glad "the bitch is back". They added "we love seeing Tamara Wall having fun, as Grace returns to her evil old ways."

Inside Soap writers have described her as having an "enormous hairdo", being "tough on the outside" and headed for heartache with Trevor. They quipped "if there's one thing scarier than Grace Black, it's Grace trying to be nice." The critic later opined that Grace and Trevor's wedding was the most shocking nuptial ever featured on a soap opera. The writer also noted that "the villainous pair have made their share of enemies over the years." They praised Wall and Passey's "heartbreaking" performances following Trevor's death. But Laura Withers was dismissed the character as a "heartless gangster" and branded Kim's obsession "bonkers".
