= Courtney Campbell =

Courtney Campbell may refer to:

- Courtney W. Campbell (1895–1971), American lawyer and politician
- Courtney Campbell (Hollyoaks), a fictional character from the British soap opera Hollyoaks
