= Kim Butterfield =

Fictional character from Hollyoaks

- Hollyoaks character
- Portrayed by: Daisy Wood-Davis
- Duration: 2014–2018
- First appearance: 7 October 2014
- Last appearance: 6 November 2018
- Introduced by: Bryan Kirkwood
In-universe information
- Occupation: Nurse
- Sisters: Lindsey Butterfield; Kath Butterfield
- Wife: Esther Bloom (2016−2018)
- Nephews: JJ Roscoe
- Nieces: Lexi Roscoe

Kim Butterfield is a fictional character from the British soap opera Hollyoaks, played by Daisy Wood-Davis. The character made her first appearance during the episode broadcast on 7 October 2014. The character and Wood-Davis' casting were announced on 23 September 2014. Kim was created to explore established character Lindsey Butterfield's (Sophie Austin) backstory and to act as a love interest for Esther Bloom (Jazmine Franks). Kim is characterised as a feisty female nurse with a complex personality. She can be evil, manipulative and obsessive but fun-loving and bubbly in other scenes. Wood-Davis has explained that when her character is "alone in her own head" she becomes insane. The character's storylines have often focused on her obsessions with other characters. During her first year on-screen, she had obsessions with Joe Roscoe (Ayden Callaghan), Grace Black (Tamara Wall) and her sister Lindsey. Her relationship with Esther remained centric to her role in the show, but Kim's affair with Grace ruined the relationship. Producers also created a dramatic car crash stunt around the character.

In a bid to explore Kim and Lindsey's past a "secret sister" Kath Butterfield (Mikaela Newton) was written into the show. Kath was brain damaged as a result of a childhood mistake involving her fellow sisters. This story was used to explain Kim's "self-destructive" behaviour. Kim was also used during a long-running storyline for Hollyoaks dubbed "The Gloved Hand Killer". Throughout 2015 a mystery character was portrayed murdering patients at the local hospital. Reporters from British news outlets had mostly come to an agreed conclusion that Kim was the culprit. But the perpetrator was revealed to be Lindsey who framed Kim for the crimes. Writers later created a wedding scenario for Kim and Esther, which lead to a surprise storyline in which the character disappears without explanation following an encounter with a mystery character. Her latest storylines included being locked in a basement by Ryan Knight (Duncan James) for months, becoming agoraphobic, being shot by Glenn Donovan (Bob Cryer) and going on the run for after taking the blame for Glenn's murder. Wood-Davis left the soap in 2018 and Kim made her final appearance on 18 October 2018. Kim has been well received by critics of the genre who have mostly discussed her mental health.

== Casting ==
The character and Wood-Davis' casting were announced on 23 September 2014. She was introduced as the younger sister of established character Lindsey Butterfield (Sophie Austin). Kim was billed as a "volatile character" who would create trouble for the show's Roscoe family. The casting announcement also revealed the character would quickly become involved in a hostage storyline. Producer Bryan Kirkwood revealed that Kim was created to explore Lindsey's past and give long-term character Esther Bloom (Jazmine Franks) a new love interest.

== Development ==
=== Characterisation and introduction ===
"Kim Butterfield is the living definition of ‘turning it up to eleven’. She’s feisty, bright and bubbly, with a personality to fit every occasion and definitely has no time for the mundane. Kim was never her parents' favourite, and spent years living in her sister's shadow. Her rebellious, fun-loving nature is a huge contrast to sensible Lindsey, so the girls fight like cat and dog, but when they’re getting along, trust us, they’re a force to be reckoned with."

Kim is characterised as a rebellious and fun-loving character who adapts her persona to suit different scenarios. Kim has felt overshadowed by her older sister Lindsey her whole life. Personality wise she is described as the opposite of Lindsey and they have a difficult relationship. Kim has been played as developing obsessions with other characters. Wood-Davis described Kim as evil and manipulative, but also has aspirations to become a genuine person. She has a "lovely side" which is only demonstrated in her nursing role. Kim is a three-dimensional character and the actress stated "I think Kim has got two or three different personalities that she flips between, depending on who she's with and what has happened that day." Kim is a "complex character" whose behaviour has been shaped by the events of her past. Wood-Davis enjoys playing a character with so many characteristics, she stated Kim has "got all these sides to her, one minute she's this normal, caring Kim who's a right laugh, but when she's alone in her own head she switches into something else."

=== Relationship with Esther Bloom ===
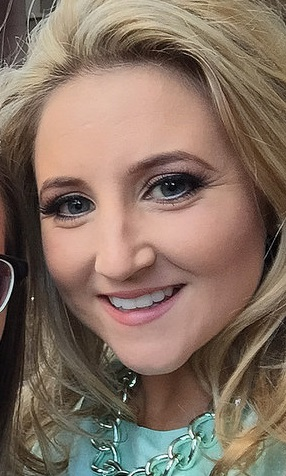
Jazmine Franks portrays Kim's love interest, Esther Bloom.

Kim asks Esther to date her but wrongly assumes that Esther is in a relationship with Grace Black (Tamara Wall). Esther seeks out Kim to explain that she is single and willing to date her. Franks explained that her character wants Kim to know their feelings are mutual. The pair kiss only to be caught by Kim's ward manager Dr. Charles S'avage (Andrew Greenough). She apologises to S'avage claiming that Esther is stalking her and the kiss was not her fault. Esther overhears Kim's lies but they later agree to date. But Grace soon becomes concerned about their relationship as Esther is acting as a surrogate mother for her child. Franks told a reporter from All About Soap that Grace wonders why Esther would want to continue their deal now she is in a new relationship. She warned that Grace would deal with anything that has the potential to ruin her baby plans. Franks added that Kim is shocked about the surrogacy because "it's an unusual situation". Wood-Davis told Nizaar Kinsella from the Daily Mirror that her character got with Esther "very quickly". She added that Kim loves Esther because it is an easy relationship.

=== Obsession with Joe Roscoe ===
Hollyoaks writers devised scenes which detailed a past obsession with Lindsey's fiancé Joe Roscoe's (Ayden Callaghan). At Lindsey's engagement party to Freddie Roscoe (Charlie Clapham), Kim gets drunk and causes trouble. She tells Joe's girlfriend Nancy Osborne (Jessica Fox) that she slept with him following his own engagement party with Lindsey. Wood-Davis told Daniel Kilkelly from Digital Spy that her character wants to make Joe look bad but doesn't tell the whole truth. Kim is pleased with Nancy's reaction to the revelation as she leaves Joe. Kim does not like Joe because of his past treatment of her.

Joe tells Nancy that Kim was obsessed with him and tricked him into sleeping with her. She tells Esther who refuses to believe it. But she later finds evidence of Kim's obsession and tells Lindsey the truth. Wood-Davis explained that Esther knows Kim is a lesbian and believes the scenario is unlikely to have occurred. But she finds inappropriate letters Kim had written to Joe and is "stunned" by her girlfriend's behaviour. She added that Lindsey is "mortified" with her sister's behaviour and wants nothing to do with Kim after she reads the letters. Wood-Davis stated that she was not worried about viewer's negative perception of her character following the story. She added that Kim "has got a genuine nice side but is capable of doing bad things too. If the audience choose not to like her, then I am happy with that as it just means I am doing my job properly." Alice Sinclair from Beamly noted that the storyline resulted in "driving a wedge" between the Butterfield sisters. The actress was happy with her character's new stories because she believed they were "evolving". She added that she never no one expected Kim to be taken down the route of obsession storylines.

=== Obsession with Grace Black ===
"I really think that she does have feelings for Grace. She loves Esther: Esther's the simple, easy relationship Kim knows is probably best for her. But there's something about Grace that lights a fire in her and gets her heart racing, so she's definitely tempted by that."

— Wood-Davis on Kim's feelings for Grace and Esther. (2015)

Writers planned a second obsession storyline for Kim when she falls in love with Grace Black (Tamara Wall). Hollyoaks released a promotional trailer which revealed that Kim would keep a diary about Grace. Wood-Davis told Daniel Kilkelly that her fictional counterpart notes down things Grace says to her or if Grace touches her. She also defaces a picture of Grace and her boyfriend Trevor Royle (Greg Wood), and keeps it in her bra. She believed Kim became obsessed with Grace quickly. She is in a simple relationship with Esther but Grace "really sets her heart racing and she can't get her out of her mind." Unable to discuss her feelings she starts the diary. The actress explained that Kim still loves Esther but more as a friend. Esther is "the simple option" and be better for her state of mind. But she cannot forget about Grace because of the danger that she brings to her life.

Grace is sent to prison awaiting trial for the supposed murder of Mercedes McQueen (Jennifer Metcalfe). Lindsey discovers Kim's diary and warns her sister to stop and reminds her the trouble her previous obsessions caused. Wood-Davis told Carena Crawford from All About Soap that Kim is "one determined woman" and it would take more than Lindsey's intervention to stop her obsessing. Kim then commits vandalism to get herself arrested and placed in the same prison as Grace. The actress explained that her character believes that Grace is the only person who can make her feel better. Kim knows it is unlikely she will be allowed to spend much time with Grace. So when she enters prison she schemes against Grace's cellmate Reenie McQueen's (Zöe Lucker). She spikes her drink with laxatives resulting in her being hospitalised and requests a transfer to Grace's cell. Wood-Davis said that it marked the first time Grace became unnerved by Kim's behaviour. She knows they kissed but was unaware that Kim has feelings for her. She believed that Kim and Grace made an "odd pairing and very unexpected" but shared commonalities in their love for Esther. Grace is scared at the prospect of permanent imprisonment and feels vulnerable. She opens up to Kim about her deteriorating relationship with Trevor because she is someone familiar. But Kim uses this as an opportunity to seduce Grace who responds positively and the pair have sex. The development lead writers to play the character even crazier than before. Wood-Davis believed that Kim behaves "she's found a pot of gold at the end of the rainbow." She deludes herself that she and Grace will leave prison as a couple unaware that Grace does not feel the same. Wall told Sally Brockway from Soaplife Grace does not realise "how insane Kim is". Their tryst makes Grace feel powerful and she does not have feelings for Kim. Wall added that Grace knows Kim is attracted to her and it makes her feel good while in prison and have a "power-trip".

The storyline helped to develop Kim's mental state to its most unstable than ever before. Grace worries that Esther will not give the baby up. She realises that by continuing her affair with Kim she manipulate her to keep Esther in the surrogacy deal. Wall branded Grace's scheme a "dangerous game" because she knows that Kim is "pretty much insane". But noted that Grace has dealt with worse people in her past, "far freakier, weirder people than Kim." Kim discovers that Grace is still being intimate with Trevor despite claiming otherwise. Wood-Davis told Sarah Ellis of Inside Soap that Kim wants revenge and prints out hundreds of screen shots of herself and Grace kissing. She then places them around Grace's nightclub. She manages to remove them before Trevor and Esther arrive. The actress believed her character never thought about the consequences of crossing Grace. The pair have an argument and Grace realises how unstable Kim has become. She decides to keep Kim happy and stops arguing and sleeps with her. However the pair are caught in bed together by Trevor's son Dylan Jenkins (James Fletcher). He keeps quiet but Kim suspects Esther caught them and begins plotting against her. Wood-Davis explained "Kim reckons that once the baby is born, the two of them can run off into the sunset with the child." This results in Kim spiking Esther's drink with labour inducing drugs to gain her happy ending with Grace.

Though writers prevented Kim from succeeding in her plans. They wrote Trevor becoming tired of Kim's interfering in his relationship and ordering Robbie Roscoe (Charlie Wernham) to kill her. Wernham told Jonathon Hughes of All About Soap that "Kim is practically family" to Robbie and he wants to do right and help her. He added that his character pleads for Kim's life and Trevor gives Kim twelve hours to leave the country. But Trevor has planted drugs in Kim's bag to get her arrested. On the way to the airport Kim refuses to leave and escapes. Robbie is then caught with the drugs instead. Kim's actions caused Wood-Davis to receive many comments on social media website Twitter. They expressed their support for "Trace" (a portmanteau of Trevor and Grace's relationship) and anger that Kim was trying to split them up.

=== Car crash stunt ===
Hollyoaks released a trailer with advance spoilers revealing that Kim would orchanstrate the car chase amongst drama surrounding Esther's surrogacy. The car chase was filmed using stunt drivers placed on top of the vehicles and pod cameras attached to them. This allowed the actors to act as though they were driving despite the stunt man being in control. The car which contains Kim and Esther was crashed using a police van which smashes into it. The car crash stunt was filmed separate and did not require Wood-Davis to be present but she chose to spectate. Real fire, smoke, fire engines and fire fighters were included in the scenes to help create the a scene of mayhem during aftermath scenes. On-set Wood-Davis said that "Kim's role in this stunt, well she is the driving force of it really." She explained that Kim realised Grace did not want her and she decided to run off with Curtis in an act of revenge. Wood-Davis and Franks were told before filming their character's would not be killed off, and the actress branded the stunt the "highlight of the role so far".

The storyline was played out on-screen following Esther giving birth to Grace's son, Curtis. Kim returns to the village and asks Esther to take Curtis and run away. She explains that Trevor and Grace tried to kill her. Wood explained to Hughes that his character cannot stand Kim and Grace's affair any longer. He put a stop to it and this leads Kim too gain revenge by taking his son away from him. Franks told Digital Spy's Kilkelly that her character agrees to run away with Kim because she believes that Trevor is lying. He tries to tell her that Kim has left the village as he thinks Robbie's plan worked, but she knows otherwise. This reinforces her belief that Kim is telling the truth and they leave. Trevor and Grace follow Kim's car and a fast chase begins. But their erratic driving leads to a crash and Trevor arrives on the scene to save Curtis. But then Kim reverses her car which leads to another collision with a police van which leads to the death of Dylan, who was in the van. The car which contained Kim and Esther explodes following their escape. The crash was named one of "the best bits of August" in the Inside Soap Yearbook 2016.

=== Secret sister and obsession with Lindsey Butterfield ===
Producers decided to explore Kim and Lindsey's backstory in 2015. Wood-Davis first spoke of surprises and insights into Kim's past months prior to the scenes being aired. She explained that it would offer viewers with reasons and understanding for Kim's behaviour. They introduced a twin sister for Kim named Kath (Mikaela Newton). She was revealed to have permanent brain damage and being cared for in a hospital. The scenes focused on Kim and Lindsey recalling the day Kim and Kath were playing by a pond, Lindsey left them unattended and Kim had become distracted. Lindsey returned to find Kath drowning and her brain starved of oxygen. Wood-Davis told Crawford (All About Soap) that both Kim and Lindsey were left distraught and guilty because they believed that they abandoned Kath. They stopped visiting Kath in hospital as frequently. Wood-Davis added that the Butterfield family "sweeps things under the carpet and if something goes wrong just don’t talk about it." As a result, Kim and Lindsey behaved the same and refuse to tell anyone in the village. She believed their characters "feel like they’re monsters and it’s completely their fault." The events had ruined Kim's life and the actress believed it was the reason her character falls in love fast and develops obsessions. Kim lost the person she was closest to and obsesses overs others to keep them close. Lindsey believes that Kath is the cause of Kim's problems and wants to stop her from visiting the hospital. She moves Kath to another home but Kim tracks her down. But Kim loses her temper and vandalises Kath's room. Wood-Davis believed her character was consumed with anger about the past and the subsequent state of her life.

Producers decided to build on the Kath's introduction by developing another obsession story Kim. She becomes obsessed with her sister Lindsey, believing she can be a replacement for Kath. Desperate to convince herself they are twins she begins to obsess over controlling her life. Kim tells Lindsey that her self-destructive occurs because of her guilt about Kath's accident. Wood-Davis told Laura Heffernan (Inside Soap) that Kim goes to extreme lengths to get close to Lindsey because she wants them to be twins. She added "Kim thinks this is the closest they've ever been" and visiting Kath is the only thing that helps her. But Lindsey reveals that she was solely responsible for Kath's accident which makes Kim feel sorry for her and triggers her intensify her obsession. Kim dyes her hair brown like Lindsey's and starts dressing identical to her. When Kim arranges a special day with Kath, Lindsey goes to her birthday party and ignores Kim but is later apologetic. Wood-Davis believed Lindsey feels manipulated by Kim and feels the need to be nice. Lindsey's kindness encourages Kim's obsessive behaviour.

Her obsession becomes worse and she begins to meddle in Lindsey's relationship with Freddie. The actress said Kim wants to be in control and for Lindsey to be hers. Freddie books a surprise holiday for her birthday which infuriates Kim. She gets drunk and enacts a scheme to prevent Lindsey from leaving. She then pretends Lindsey's son has a skull fracture which occurred during him being in Freddie's care. She doctors medical records to make it appear JJ has been harmed. When Wood-Davis read the scripts she was shocked because "it was a bit close to the bone, she's really pushing it this time."

=== "Gloved Hand Killer" ===
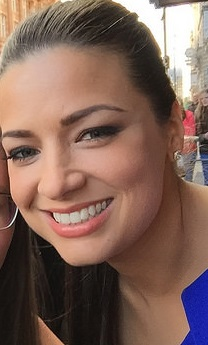
"We're now starting to explore Lindsey and Kim's relationship more and realising they're both nutters together. It's funny, though, because the fans suddenly think Kim's the sane one. I keep telling everyone that she isn't - Kim might not kill people, but she doesn't behave normally either!" — Sophie Austin (pictured) on Kim.

On 4 November 2014, Hollyoaks publicised a storyline dubbed "the gloved hand killer". It was described as a long-running mystery story in which a serial killer begins committing murders at the local hospital. Kilkelly stated that one character would be murdered with a lethal injection at Dee Valley Hospital in an episode airing in January 2015. However, viewers would not be shown the killer's identity, only their gloved hand which creates the mystery. The perpetrator has complete access to the hospital patients and believes they have a right to decide who should live or die. As Kim is a nurse at the hospital she becomes a suspect alongside Lindsey, Dr. S'avage, Celine McQueen (Sarah George) and Tegan Lomax (Jessica Ellis). Hollyoaks kept the killer's identity a secret for ten months before revealing their identity.

Over the course of the year the storyline generated much publicity and speculation of who the killer could be. In February 2015, Daniel Kilkelly opined that as Kim was still a new character she was a "blank slate" and would not be surprised if she was the killer. In April, All About Soap published an article dedicated to why their staff believed Kim was the murderer. By October, Carl Greenwood from the Daily Mirror believed that Kim was a "real contender" to be the killer. But they believed her to be too obvious because of her "crazy" behaviour. Tamara Hardingham-Gill writing for Metro echoed their comments naming Kim "the most obvious suspect" and least surprising if she had been the killer. The Huffington Post's Ashley Percival also believed Kim was the culprit. Viewers also believed that Kim was the killer and she topped a poll ran via Beamly with over 566,000 votes. But Tina Miles from the Liverpool Echo believed that she was too obvious a suspect.

The killer's identity was revealed during a special week of episodes celebrating the show's twentieth anniversary. Before the reveal writers played Kim committing a number of strange acts around the hospital making viewers and some critics believe she was the killer. An article published via Virgin Media reported that Kim had become the main suspect. The gloved hand killer was later revealed to be Lindsey when she tried to kill her husband Freddie. Austin who plays Lindsey told a reporter from the Irish Examiner that she believed Lindsey would be the killer following Kim's introduction and their shared backstory with Kath.

Kim learns the truth but decides to keep Lindsey's murder spree a secret. But when Lindsey fears she will be caught she frames Kim for the murders. Wood-Davis told Kilkelly that her character is scared and emotional but does not want Lindsey to be caught either. She is almost glad Lindsey has not been arrested but her situation is not ideal. She added that she has to rely on Lindsey to try and clear her name. The actress was surprised by Kim's imprisonment but viewed it as a "really good twist". She added that the audience gained a sense of where each character's loyalties lie. Kim is loyal to Lindsey but she does not behave the same in return. The storyline also helped to change viewer's opinion of Kim who was portrayed as a "victim" for the first time. Wood-Davis believed fans thought Lindsey was the crazy sister. She noted that Kim is "still a little bit loopy" but not as bad as Lindsey.

=== Marriage and disappearance ===
Writers decided to reunite Kim and Esther's relationship and the characters move in together. They continued to include Grace in their story and requests that Esther move in with her without Kim. She is upset with Grace's plan and promotional spoiler pictures were released depicting Kim having a mental breakdown. Esther is furious and believes Grace's plan has ruined Kim's mental health. Kim is taken to hospital where Celine realises that she is faking the symptoms of a mental breakdown. Esther forgives Kim and they decide to get married. Grace refuses to attend the wedding because of her dislike of Kim. She tries to convince Grace to change her mind, which annoys her more. Franks told Brockaway from Soaplife that Grace thinks Kim is a "nutter" and would be accepting if it were another woman. Franks empathised with Grace, noting that Kim did plant cameras in Grace's home to spy on her. Esther's grandmother Frankie Osborne (Helen Pearson) is unhappy with their plans and tries to sabotage their wedding day with Grace's help.

Franks told Alison Gardner from What's on TV that Kim is her character's "safety net and she loves her, although she always lets her down. Getting married is a bit of a statement. They want to prove everyone wrong. Also Esther is very family-orientated and she’s always dreamed of having a big wedding day." Producers complicated the situation, in style often accustomed to soap opera weddings. Grace continues to try and sabotage the wedding. This prompts Esther to confront her friend and issues an ultimatum. She tells Grace that she will not marry Kim if she wants to be with her. Franks told Laura Heffernan of Inside Soap that Esther just wants to know what Grace's problem is and is not being genuine about the offer. Kim overhears part of the conversation and fails to realise Esther was just trying to provoke Grace. She attends the wedding and attempts to jilt Esther accusing her of loving Grace. The ceremony then goes ahead after Esther convinces Kim.

The show aired surprise scenes in which Kim arrives home to prepare for her honeymoon and is confronted by a mystery intruder. Kim then vanished off-screen and Esther was depicted discovering a suspicious good-bye note from Kim. The scenes left it open to interpretation as to whether Kim had been intimidated into leaving or murdered. Some viewers used social media website Twitter to speculate that the character had been killed off, inundating Wood-Davis with questions. The actress refused to reveal what had happened to Kim and did not state she had left Hollyoaks. Wood-Davis told Hayley Minn of OK! that her on-screen counterpart had disappeared and "we don't know when or if she's going to come back, so it's just a bit of a waiting game to see if the truth comes out." She teased that if Kim did return there would be "a big explosion of secrets."

=== Departure ===
On 3 October 2018, it was announced that Wood-Davis had filmed her final scenes with Hollyoaks and Kim would depart later in the year. Producers would not reveal any details about the character's exit.

== Storylines ==
Kim arrives in the village to work as a nurse at the local hospital and tells her sister, Lindsey Butterfield (Sophie Austin), that she is a lesbian. Kim is held hostage by Big Bob (Vincent Ebrahim) who threatens to shoot her for helping injured hostages. Big Bob is later killed and she escapes. Kim begins dating Esther Bloom (Jazmine Franks) who is acting as a surrogate mother for Grace Black (Tamara Wall) and Trevor Royle's (Greg Wood) baby. Kim's involvement with Esther causes a feud with Grace as they compete for Esther's attention. Grace uses Kim to help frame Freddie Roscoe (Charlie Clapham) for Mercedes McQueen's (Jennifer Metcalfe) "murder" and lets her move into her flat with Esther. Kim kisses Grace who reciprocates which causes her to develop an obsession with Grace. Kim tells Nancy Osborne (Jessica Fox) that she had sex with her boyfriend and Lindsey's ex-fiancé, Joe Roscoe (Ayden Callaghan), years ago. She adds that Joe forced her to terminate the subsequent pregnancy. When Nancy confronts Joe he reveals that Kim became obsessed with him and tricked him into having sex. Grace is arrested on suspicion of killing Mercedes. Kim feels alone without Grace and smashes a police car window. Kim is arrested for vandalism and spends time with Grace in custody. She then tells Trevor that Grace no longer wants contact to cause a rift between them. Nancy becomes concerned about Kim's behaviour and tells Esther that Kim had an obsession with Joe. Kim takes a lie detector test to prove that she loves Esther and reveals that she only became involved with Joe because she was jealous of Lindsey. Kim threatens to reveal secrets about Lindsey after she reports her behaviour to the hospital. It is revealed that Kim has a permanently hospitalised twin sister with brain damage, named Kath (Mikaela Newton). Lindsey discovers that Kim has been visiting Kath and moves her to a different care home to prevent access. Kim is sent to prison for vandalism.

Kim spikes Reenie McQueen's (Zöe Lucker) drink with laxatives to hospitalise her and remove her from a shared cell with Grace. Kim concocts a scheme and is then moved into the cell. Kim seduces Grace and they sleep together. But Grace is annoyed by the events and forces Kim to seek legal help and she is released. When Grace is released Kim tells Trevor that she slept with Grace causing them to break-up for a while. Esther also ends their relationship but Grace is left heartbroken and threatens Kim with a gun believing she has ruined her life. Kim discovers that Trevor's teenage son, Dylan Jenkins (James Fletcher), has been cross-dressing and she starts to bully him. Grace agrees to help Kim win Esther back so that she can be certain Esther will give the baby up. But when Grace pretends that Kim has been hit by a car Esther calls off the surrogacy deal. Esther confesses her love to Kim and they reconcile, Grace tries to convince Kim to tell Esther to give the baby up. Angered by her recent actions, Kim turns on Grace and refuses to help. Kim blackmails Dylan to plant a hidden web-camera in Grace's flat or she will tell Trevor he is cross-dressing. Via the webcam, Kim witnesses Trevor's ex-partner and Dylan's mother, Val Jenkins (Tanya Robb) try to kiss him. Kim edits the footage and prints a screenshot to make it appear to Grace that Trevor has been unfaithful. She pretends to be sympathetic to Grace and manages to sleep with her again. Grace pretends to have feelings for Kim and begins an affair in order to convince her to get Esther to give the baby up. Kim uses the webcam to continually spy on Grace and notices that she has lied about being intimate with Trevor. Kim prints pictures of her and Grace kissing and sticks them up around Grace's business. Grace manages to remove them before anyone sees and tries to convince Kim to keep their affair a secret. Dylan catches them in bed together and threatens to tell Esther.

Kim drugs Esther into giving birth prematurely and she gives birth to Curtis and refuses to give him to Grace and Trevor. When Grace tells Kim that she wants her to become a family with Curtis, Kim induces Esther into a coma. But Esther's grandmother Frankie is given custody of Curtis, and Kim realises that Grace has been using her to get the baby. Trevor later orders Robbie to kill Kim but he warns her of Trevor's demands and Kim flees the village. During her absence Kim begins manipulating Dylan online anonymously under the name "Gothboy98". Esther is released from hospital and Kim convinces her to run away with Curtis. Grace and Trevor start a car chase with them which results in Kim and Esther's car crashing. Kim reverses her crashed car which collides with a police van carrying Dylan inside it. This results in the circumstance that lead Dylan's eventual death. Esther discovers the full extent of Kim's obsession and affair with Grace and she ends their relationship again. Lindsey reveals that she caused Kath to drown when they were children. Kim then offers to be there for Lindsey but this develops into another obsession. As she spends more time with Lindsey she begins to cause trouble in her relationship with Freddie. She makes him look unable to look after Lindsey's son JJ. Then she pretends a small accident which occurred in Freddie's car, has caused JJ to have a fractured skull. She later sends texts off Freddie's phone inviting Lindsey home, climbs into bed while Freddie is asleep making it look like they have had sex. Kim discovers that Lindsey is responsible for a series of murders in the hospital and threatens to report her. Lindsey manipulates Kim into silence and she tries to make Lindsey stop killing. She becomes annoyed with Kim's meddling and injects her with potassium chloride. The attack does not kill her, but Lindsey continues to treat her and sedate her to avoid her regaining control. When Kim comes round she agrees to remain quiet. She later takes the blame for the killings to protect Lindsey and is sent to prison. Kim is released from prison and Lindsey goes on the run. She blackmails Kim into helping her to steal her son from the Roscoe's. Lindsey then goes into labour, Kim helps her give birth. Lindsey is then murdered by serial killer Silas Blissett (Jeff Rawle).

Kim and Esther reconcile, angering Esther's grandmother Frankie Osborne (Helen Pearson). Frankie attempts to ruin the relationship so Kim tries to convince her that she has changed. Grace asks Esther to move in with her and leave Kim. A jealous Kim fakes a mental breakdown leaving Esther worried. Celine McQueen (Sarah George) discovers that Kim is lying and Esther ends their relationship. Kim manages to justify her behaviour and makes Esther realise she loves her. They decide to get married but Grace and Frankie try to sabotage their wedding day. Kim tries to jilt Esther believing that she is still in love with Grace. Esther convinces Kim that she only wants her and they get married. Kim is then kidnapped and Esther believes she has left her. Kim returns unexpectedly and tells Esther to stay away from her and Kath and leaves again. Kim gets a visit from Grace, Cindy Savage (Stephanie Waring) and Eva Falco (Kerry Bennett) to the whereabouts of the Osbornes.

After Esther's brain injury after being shot by Eva, Kim rents a flat for her and Esther to live in and she fears that Esther will leave her to be with Grace. She convinces Esther that Grace shot her. Kim tells Esther not to leave the flat for her safety and manipulates her using her memory troubles to segregate her from her family. After Esther confronts Kim about her manipulation she injects her with sedatives to stop her leaving. Esther wakes up with a caste on her leg and Kim tells her that she fell off the city wall and broke it and that Grace has murdered Frankie and Jack Osborne (Jimmy McKenna). The two prepare to move away but Kim's lies are quickly exposed by Grace and their relationship subsequently ends. Kim is later seen to have secretly moved into the Osbornes' attic with a shrine built to Esther. Kim witnesses an intimate moment between Esther and Grace while hiding in the attic. Kim decides to get rid of Grace and enters her flat armed with a syringe. Esther realises what she is doing and rushes to save Grace but finds Kim standing on the village wall, threatening to jump off. Grace is fine, but Esther pleads with Kim to get down and when she tries to get down she slips and falls of the wall. She is rushed to hospital and Esther tells her to get professional help.

Kim grows close to psychologist Farrah Maalik (Krupa Pattani). She develops an obsession with Farrah and when she finds out its their last therapy session, she tries to prolong treatment. When Kim admits the truth they begin a relationship, despite Farrah's mother Misbah's (Harvey Virdi) objection. Kim finds a recording belonging to Sami Maalik (Rishi Nair), revealing that Ellie Nightingale (Sophie Porley) pushed her father Mac Nightingale (David Easter) out the window. Kim discovers Sami's plan to destroy the Nightingales and confronts him, but he tells her to stay quiet. Kim and the Maaliks are involved in a car accident but all survive. Kim discovers a voicemail and finds out that Ryan Knight (Duncan James) killed his wife Amy Barnes (Ashley Slanina-Davies) and put Tegan Lomax (Jessica Ellis) in a coma. She confronts Ryan and he kidnaps her, before locking her in the basement at Hollyoaks High. Kim remains trapped for months, surviving on tinned beans and starts talking to a Rick Astley poster for company. Ryan tells Farrah he killed Kim and Farrah is determined to give her a dignified burial. Kim cuts her hand on tin which becomes infected and she collapses. Farrah and Grace find Kim breathing and she is rushed to hospital.

Kim struggles after her ordeal and is to scared to go outside. Farrah convinces her to go for a drink and she does, but when she witnesses a fight she rushes home. Farrah turns down a promotion so that she can stay at home and take care of Kim. Kim tries to prove to Farrah that she can cope on her own and goes out to get her a present. Kim just about manages to get to The Bean and Farrah is annoyed that it was that easy for her. Kim starts visiting the basement again to feel comfortable, and it is the only place she feels safe. Kim returns to the basement the next day and is horrified when the door closes, leaving her trapped again. Farrah tells Grace she will leave Kim so they can be together. Farrah finds out where Kim is and rescues her and later tells Grace that she needs to stay with Kim.

Kim becomes suspicious of Farrah when she finds a text from Grace on Farrah's phone. Farrah confesses to having an affair and pleads with Kim to forgive her. Kim later confronts Grace about the affair, and an argument is witnessed by Glenn Donovan (Bob Cryer). Grace reminds her of the bad things she did in the past but tells her to forgive Farrah. Kim meets up with Farrah outside The Dog in the Pond public house but Glenn, who mistakes Kim for Grace's mystery women, shoots her in the village. Farrah screams for help and Kim is rushed to hospital and is taken to surgery. Maxine Minniver (Nikki Sanderson) gives Glenn a false alibi which means he is in the clear. Kim has life-saving surgery and begins her recovery. After Glenn is murdered by serial killer Breda McQueen (Moya Brady), Kim decides to go on the run and take the blame. Simone Loveday (Jacqueline Boatswain) later reveals that Kim had fled to the Dominican Republic, being hunted by Glenn's son Liam Donovan's (Jude Monk McGowan) associates.

== Reception ==
The character has generated much opinion from columnists of Inside Soap. One writer believed that the Butterfield sisters are always keeping secrets and branded the truth about Kath a "shocking reveal". They later stated that "you always find a very high class of borderline psycho in Hollyoaks, and there’s none finer than Kim Butterfield." In other articles Kim has been called an "obsessed nurse" and Michael Cregan praised Wood-Davis' portrayal of Kim, stating, "we love actress Daisy Wood-Davis’ performance as the increasingly unhinged Kim Butterfield, growing more and more obsessed with Grace Black. Every shot throws up another fantastic facial expression, from devoted love to heartbroken anger." She was later labelled "mad as hell" and to have shown "plenty of unreasonable behaviour in her past." Fellow colleague Laura-Jayne Tyler opined that "as soap loonies go, Hollyoaks' Kim really takes the biscuit. A biscuit she'd then poison, before spying on it via a webcam and pretending to be its brother."

A reporter for The Sun's "TV Soap" magazine branded Kim a "weirdo" for getting herself incarcerated with Grace. Kim fooled All About Soap' Kerry Barrett who believed Kim was a normal character just a little odd. Their opinion of Kim changed and she branded the character "kooky Kim", "cuckoo", "crazy", "increasingly unstable", "a few sandwiches short of a picnic" and "seems to have lost her grip on reality completely". Their colleagues Jane Howdle and Laura Morgan added "cunning Kim", "love-struck loon", "loopy Kim", "nutty nurse", "the bonkers Butterfield", "crafty Kim", "lovesick" and "potty" to the list. Hardingham-Gill (Metro) wrote that Kim had been "seriously unhinged during her short time in Hollyoaks." She viewed her involvement with Grace as a "scary obsession" and believed she should not be allowed to work in nursing. Kim's unhinged behaviour lead Miles (Liverpool Echo) to agree with the Sienna comparison. She also called her a "cunning nurse", "compulsive liar" who has "bizarre obsessions". Victoria Wilson from TVTimes branded Kim the "Hollyoaks schemer".
