= Luke Jerdy =

British actor (born 1990)

- Born: Majid Luke Mehdizadeh-Valoujerdy; 5 January 1990 (age 36); Derby, East Midlands, England
- Education: Manchester School of Theatre
- Occupation: Actor
- Spouse: Daisy Wood-Davis (m. 2022)
- Children: 2

Majid Luke Mehdizadeh-Valoujerdy (born 5 January 1990), formerly known professionally as Luke Jerdy, is a British actor. He is best known for his portrayal of Jesse Donovan in the Channel 4 soap opera Hollyoaks, a role in which he played regularly from April 2016 until January 2020. He has also performed in the theatre.

== Early life ==
Jerdy is from Derby in the East Midlands, and is half-Iranian. His full name is Majid Luke Mehdizadeh-Valoujerdy, but he changed it to avoid confusing casting directors. He studied at the Manchester School of Theatre, graduating in 2011.

== Career ==
Before his role in Hollyoaks, he featured in The Turing Enigma (2011), Act/Or (2015), and Chosen (2016).

He also made an appearance in a 2011 episode of Doctors, in an episode titled "An Uneasy Harmony", playing the role of Michael Webb.

== Filmography ==
Year	Title	Role	Notes
2011	Doctors	Michael Webb	Guest role
2016–2020	Hollyoaks	Jesse Donovan	Regular role
2020	Hollyoaks Later	Jesse Donovan	2020 special
2024	Doctor Who	Carson	Episode: "Boom"
