= Tamara Wall =

English actress (born 1977)

- Born: 23 July 1977 (age 48); Weybridge, Surrey
- Occupation: Actress
- Years active: 1999–present
- Television: EastEnders; Hollyoaks

Tamara Wall (born 23 July 1977) is an English actress, best known for playing Grace Black in the Channel 4 soap opera Hollyoaks (2013–2025). Prior to her decade stint in Hollyoaks, Wall played Martina Quinn in the BBC soap opera EastEnders. Wall performed the role of Brooke Wyndham in the West End production of Legally Blonde. Wall also appeared as Karen in musical Viva Forever!. She made a guest appearance in One Night in 2012. In 2017, Wall appeared in the third celebrity special of The Crystal Maze.

== Filmography ==
Year	Title	Role	Notes
2000	Cinderella	Dancer	Television film
2011	EastEnders	Martina Quinn	Recurring role; 4 episodes
2012	One Night	Sandra	Episode: "Alfie"
2013–2025	Hollyoaks	Grace Black	Regular role; 981 episodes
2017	The Crystal Maze	Herself	British game show
2020	Hollyoaks Later	Grace Black	2020 special

== Awards and nominations ==
Year	Award	Category	Result	Ref.
2014	Inside Soap Awards	Best Newcomer	Nominated	
2014	Inside Soap Awards	Best Bitch	Shortlisted	
2015	Inside Soap Awards	Best Bad Girl	Shortlisted	
2015	Inside Soap Awards	Best Partnership (shared with Greg Wood)	Shortlisted	
2016	Inside Soap Awards	Best Actress	Nominated	
2016	Inside Soap Awards	Funniest Female	Nominated	
2016	Inside Soap Awards	Best Partnership (shared with Wood)	Nominated	
2017	Inside Soap Awards	Best Bad Girl	Shortlisted	
2018	23rd National Television Awards	Serial Drama Performance	Nominated	
2018	Inside Soap Awards	Best Bad Girl	Shortlisted	
2020	Inside Soap Awards	Best Villain	Nominated	
