= Daisy Wood-Davis =

British singer and actress (born 1990)

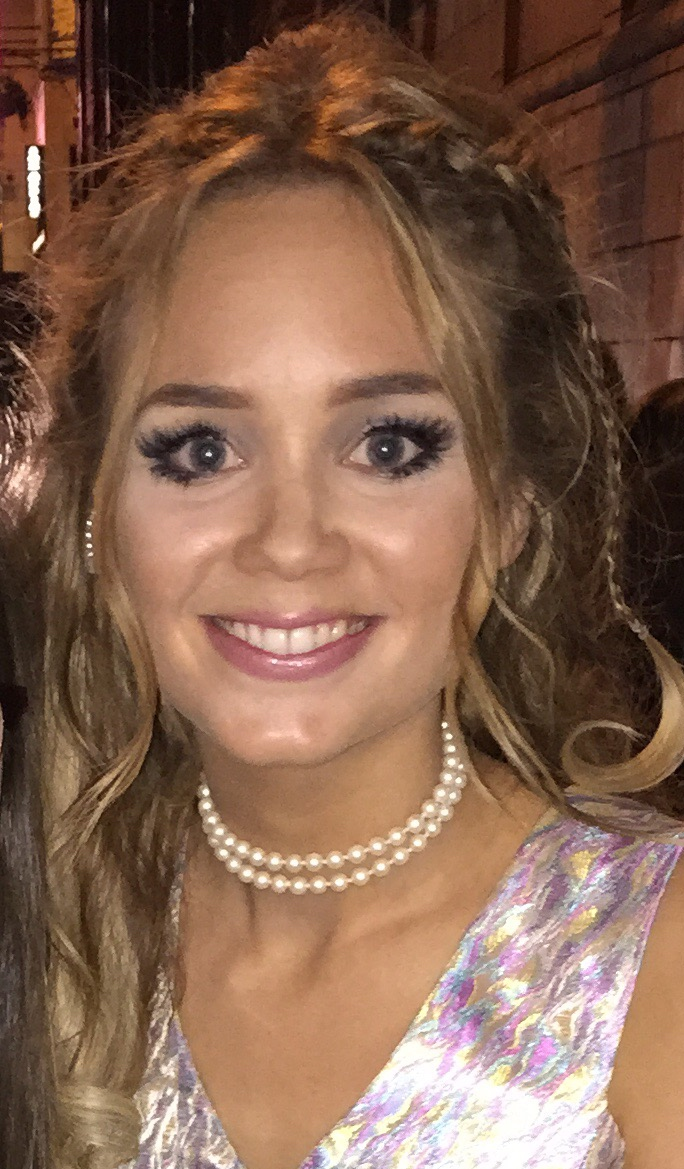
- Wood-Davis in 2015
- Born: 1989 or 1990 (age 34–35); Bromley, Greater London, England
- Occupation(s): Actress, singer
- Spouse: Luke Jerdy (m. 2022)
- Children: 2

Daisy Wood-Davis is a British singer and actress. She has appeared in several stage productions, and television series including Dreamboats and Petticoats as Laura, in EastEnders as Tansy, and in The Rocky Horror Show as Janet Weiss. From 2014 to 2018, she played the role of Kim Butterfield in Hollyoaks. In 2019, she recurred as Phoebe Palmer in Holby City.

== Early life ==
Wood-Davis grew up in Petts Wood, and attended Crofton School and later Darrick Wood School. She trained at the Italia Conti Academy of Theatre Arts.

== Career ==
While she was at Italia Conti, Wood-Davis saw an advertisement for open auditions for Bill Kenwright's production of Dreamboats and Petticoats. She attended the audition and was given the lead role of Laura. She stated, "I had my West End debut as a lead part at the age of 18. It was unbelievable, it was all my dreams and more. It was amazing." Wood-Davis also toured with the production, and featured on a cast album, which has sold over 60,000 copies.

Wood-Davis later signed a record deal with Universal Music. She also played Janet Weiss in the European tour of the musical The Rocky Horror Show.

In November 2012, Wood-Davis appeared in one episode of BBC soap opera EastEnders as Tansy Meadow, the sister of established character Poppy Meadow (Rachel Bright). She also appears as Tansy in a 15-minute spin-off episode called "All I Want for Christmas".

From 2014 to 2018, she played the role of Kim Butterfield in Hollyoaks, the sister of Lindsey Butterfield (Sophie Austin).

Following her departure from Hollyoaks, Wood-Davis made a guest appearance as Phoebe Palmer in Holby City. She later returned to film further appearances, which aired in late 2019.

In 2019, she played the role of Sheila in Hair the Musical, in Glasgow and Edinburgh. In November 2019, it was announced that Wood-Davis would play singer-songwriter Carole King in the UK and Ireland touring production of Beautiful: The Carole King Musical in 2020.

== Personal life ==
Wood-Davis announced her engagement to her Hollyoaks co-star Luke Jerdy in August 2019. In May 2021, Wood-Davis and Jerdy announced that they were expecting their first child together, and their first son was born on 28 September 2021. On 18 June 2022, Jerdy and Wood-Davis married. In June 2024, the couple announced that they were expecting their second child together, and their second son was born on 8 December 2024.
