= Ben Bradley (Hollyoaks) =

Fictional character from Hollyoaks

- Hollyoaks character
- Portrayed by: Ben Richards
- Duration: 2015–16
- First appearance: 26 May 2015
- Last appearance: 27 May 2016
In-universe information
- Occupation: Police sergeant Police constable
- Wife: Sadie Bradley (until 2016); Sienna Blake (2016–17)
- Sons: Josh Bradley; Ryan Bradley; Taylor Bradley
- Daughters: Carly Bradley
- Adoptive daughters: Nico Blake

Ben Bradley is a fictional character from the British soap opera Hollyoaks, portrayed by Ben Richards. The character and casting were announced in April 2015 and Richards made his first appearance as Ben on 26 May 2015. Richards and his family moved to a cottage in Liverpool close to the Hollyoaks set after he was cast. Ben was introduced as a police sergeant and a mentor for Jason Roscoe (Alfie Browne-Sykes), and Ben was given links to long-running characters Darren Osborne (Ashley Taylor Dawson) and Jack Osborne (Jimmy McKenna). Ben was also introduced as a love interest for Sienna Blake (Anna Passey). Richards explained that Ben has a hero complex and sees Sienna as a project that he can fix. It was also teased by Richards and the media that Ben would have a big secret which would have big effects.

Ben's secret daughter Carly (Sophie Wise) was later introduced, and it was revealed that Ben's secret involved helping Carly escape from a drug dealer and start a new life. Sienna suspects that Ben is having an affair with Carly and confronts her, which leads Sienna's daughter Nico Blake (Persephone Swales-Dawson) killing Carly in an altercation. Sienna and Nico cover up the crime and a grieving Ben blames Trevor Royle (Greg Wood) for her death. Ben and Trevor become enemies and Ben tries to kill Trevor and frames him for other crimes. Ben remains unaware of the truth about Carly's death and gets closer to Sienna and Nico. Richards compared the storyline to Othello, and believed that Ben is a good guy who believes that he is making the wrong choices for the right reasons. Sienna and Trevor then start an affair and Sienna marries Ben despite being in love with Trevor.

In May 2016, Richards announced that he would be departing Hollyoaks and teased that Ben would have an unhappy ending. In the storyline, Ben finds out about Sienna and Trevor's affair and takes the blame when Nico stabs Trevor to death. Ben is arrested and made his last appearance on 27 May 2016. Ben is later released offscreen and divorces Sienna. In 2018, the character was revisited when Sienna gets a stalker and suspects that it is Ben, which led to the introduction of his son Josh Bradley (Rupert Hill). Richards revealed that Ben and Sienna's pairing initially had a positive reaction from viewers. Critics had mixed opinions about the character and in 2018 speculated that he was Sienna's stalker.

== Casting ==
In April 2015, it was announced that Ben Richards had joined the cast of Hollyoaks as new regular character Ben Bradley and he had already begun filming for the role. It was revealed that Ben is a police sergeant who would feature in a storyline involving established character Jason Roscoe (Alfie Browne-Sykes), which would see Jason joining the police force for a fresh start and Ben becoming his mentor and giving him the confidence that he needs. Ben was also introduced as a love interest for the "village's schemer" Sienna Blake (Anna Passey), with a Hollyoaks insider revealing, "Never one to miss an opportunity, Sienna immediately sets her sights on [Ben] when he arrives in the village. Unfortunately Ben seems not to have been completely truthful about his past and is making a big mistake if he thinks this will slip past Sienna". A spokesperson for the soap told Digital Spy, "We are delighted to confirm that Ben Richards has joined the cast. We hope Sgt Bradley settles into Hollyoaks village - despite becoming unwisely entangled with Sienna Blake." Shortly before he began filming for the role, Richards' partner gave birth to their first child. The family later moved to a cottage close to the Hollyoaks set in Liverpool. Richards developed a close family friendship with his co-star Ayden Callaghan, who portrayed Joe Roscoe, despite the characters not interacting often in the soap, as Callaghan's partner was pregnant at the same time that Richards' partner was. Richards made his first appearance as Ben on 26 May 2015.

== Development ==
=== Introduction and characterisation ===
Teasing what was to come for Ben, Richards explained that he would be "very, very involved" in upcoming storylines, and explained that Ben would have some problems with "a big crime" that Ben is "very personally" involved in, and that Ben would have both challenges are as a police officer in addition to emotional challenges. The actor also teased that Ben would face "all sorts of challenges". Richards added, "Ben is an interesting character and there's lots planned for what's going to happen to him. I've heard some ideas of what's planned for the future and it should be really exciting and interesting." In an introductory Hollyoaks video promoting the character, Richards described Ben as an "all-round nice guy", "dependable", "caring" and a "top bloke" that someone would want to get a drink with. He described Ben as a "Mr Fix-it" and a "sucker" for somebody who is in trouble or "a bit broken" as Ben will "fix" them; Richards hoped that Ben would be the Sargeant that the village "desperately needs".

"He's one of life's nice guys and just an ordinary, lovely bloke. Ben's got a bit of a hero complex and if he finds someone that's a bit broken and needs fixing, then he'll be the man to try and do that. You'll see him trying to help a couple of people in the village."

— Richards on Ben's personality (2015)

Ben first appears when he is assigned to be the mentor of Jason, who is now a working as a PCSO. Describing Ben and Jason's working relationship, Richards explained that Ben and Jason link up quickly as Ben wants to be police officer, and Jason looks up to Ben as he sees him as the "kind of policeman that [Jason] wants to be", and thus Ben becomes his role model. Ben first investigates the hit and run of Dylan Jenkins (James Fletcher), unaware that Jason was involved in it. Ben notices that Jason seems uncomfortable when they speak to Dylan at the hospital. He later researches Jason and is concerned what he finds. It was teased by Digital Spy that Jason's career would begin poorly due to these circumstances. Upon Ben's introduction, it is revealed that Ben used to work with long-running character Jack Osborne (Jimmy McKenna), and Richards revealed that future plots would explore their friendship, and that he had filmed some "really good stuff" with McKenna and Ashley Taylor Dawson, who plays Jack's son Darren Osborne. Richards called McKenna a "lovely actor" to work with. Offscreen, Richards built up a friendship with Dawson and praised him for being a "smart actor".

=== Romance with Sienna and secret ===
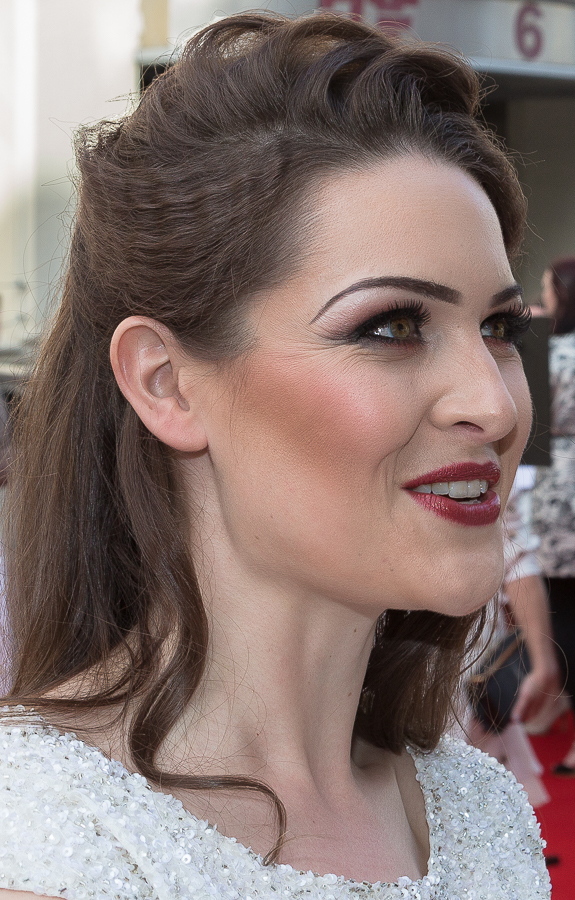
Anna Passey (pictured) portrays Ben's love interest Sienna Blake.

Ben is single when he comes to Hollyoaks and he meets Sienna Blake (Anna Passey). Richards called Ben's relationship with Sienna "very interesting" due to Sienna being "such an unusual character" with a varied history and a lot of "skeletons in her closet". Richards teased, "Watching that dynamic with Ben, and the fact that he has got various things going on in his life which he is keeping secret, causes mayhem. At the moment Ben doesn't know about her brother Dodger, but he does find that Darren, who is a really good mate of his, is Sienna's ex. That is going to be fun, interesting and also slightly awkward." Describing Ben, Passey called him "the hot new police officer on the scene" and noted how people were "waiting to see" if he would save "from herself". Sienna and Ben first meet when he saves Sienna's handbag, which is stolen, and he gives it back to her; Passey explained that this causes Sienna to see "love hearts and birds singing and it's a whole new thing for her". Sienna becomes "smitten" when she meets Ben and is delighted when he asks her out on a date the following week, with the pair sharing a kiss. Sophie Dainty from Digital Spy wrote that it was "clear" that Sienna has "romance on her mind", but questioned whether Ben could be hiding something. Richards liked working with Passey and called her "sweet" and a "constant professional", explaining that it made it easier working with someone who is "so committed".

Richards teased that Sienna would be keeping Ben on his toes, and that Ben wants to fix Sienna as she is a "very broken woman", explaining that with Sienna "there's a lot to fix, but Ben is very aware about her troubled past and it doesn't scare him off at all. In fact, if anything, it probably makes him like her even more. She becomes a bit of a project in his eyes". Richards believed that their relationship would not be simple or straightforward, though he added that this was never the case in Hollyoaks. Richards was not sure if the pairing was a "healthy match" but believed that Ben has a "bit of a hero complex" and feels like he needs to save people, adding, "If there's any woman with a broken wing, that means he has to come in and fix it. Sienna fits that bill completely - she's a broken woman and he feels that he can save her". Richards added that it is the first "proper stability" that Sienna has had "for a long time".

Richards revealed that the first "bit of tension" between the couple would occur when Ben meets Sienna's controlling father, Patrick Blake (Jeremy Sheffield). When Patrick returns from his holiday, he finds out that Sienna's new relationship with Ben "gets in the way of his controlling behaviour". Richards explained that Ben is a "strong character" who is there to support Sienna, which Patrick cannot handle. The actor did not reveal whether Patrick would come around, but he added that Ben can "hold his own" against Patrick as he is a policeman and is used to dealing with "all sorts" everyday. In the storyline, Ben and Sienna are "left red-faced" when Patrick returns from his holiday with Theresa McQueen (Jorgie Porter) and finds them getting intimate on the sofa. Patrick immediately gets to know Patrick and at an "awkward lunch" he quizzes Ben on his intentions towards Sienna. Ben makes his feelings towards Patrick clear and refuses to be intimidated by him, telling Patrick that he will not leave Sienna. An "unnerved" Patrick then tells Sienna that she should end her relationship with Ben, claiming that he is not good for her.

=== Death of daughter ===
Prior to Ben's debut, Richards teased that Ben has a "big secret" that Sienna does not know about, but he did not specify what it was, though he later teased that viewers would find out what Ben is hiding and why. Richards also revealed that Ben has a "complicated" family past which would get in the way of his relationship with Sienna. In the storyline, Nico becomes suspicious of Ben and follows him, and she then warns her mother than Ben is not all that he seems. Richards explained that Sienna is a "very highly-strung character" and thus she becomes very paranoid when she realises that Ben is hiding a secret from her. Richards teased that viewers would learn more about Ben when his secret is revealed and that there would be "massive" consequences "from this strand of story" for him, which would have a "massive ripple effect". Passey teased at the 2015 British Soap Awards that Ben and Sienna's relationship would not go smoothly due to Ben's secret. She also teased that Sienna would not deal with it well and would go "on the warpath". The secret was used to reignite the feud between Sienna and Jack's daughter-in-law Nancy Hayton (Jessica Fox), as Sienna assumes that Nancy is having sex with Ben as revenge for Sienna stealing Darren from years prior, though in fact Ben was just staying at her home to talk to Jack; Sienna confronts Nancy and "furiously" slaps her and lashes out when she denies it, leading to a "big catfight".

In July 2015, actress Sophie Wise joined Hollyoaks as Ben's daughter, Carly Bradley. Viewers had already been aware that Ben had been meeting up with a mystery woman who was in "serious trouble", but her connection to Ben was kept hidden. It transpires that Carly is in witness protection due to "trouble" from a drug dealer Ashley Davidson (Kierston Wareing), who she is hiding from. Wise was happy to be on the soap as she got to work with "lovely" Richards, and she explained that Carly's "troubled past and addiction to drugs" has resulted in her being "watchful eye of her dad, Ben". She also teased that this would not stop her getting in trouble and that she would cross paths with Sienna due to Sienna being so close to Ben. Richards revealed that Ben and Carly have "been on the run" and are dealing with their drug addiction, and that they moved to the village to give Carly a new identity.

Ben hides Carly from Sienna, but her daughter Nico Blake (Persephone Swales-Dawson) spots Ben with Carly and tells Sienna that Ben is having an affair. Sienna is "distraught" as she believes that Ben has left her for another woman, and when Patrick teases her over this, she meets up with Charles S'avage (Andrew Greenough), who comforts her. He later deletes a voicemail from Ben to Sienna, leaving her unaware that her boyfriend tried to contact her. When a "furious" Sienna spots Ben saying a "tearful" goodbye to Carly, who is planning to a rehab facility in Scotland, she follows Carly home with Nico as she suspects that Carly is having an affair with Ben and is suspicious of. Wen Sienna tries to confront Carly, the conversation turns "physical" and Nico, terrified for her mother's safety, grabs a paperweight and smashes it on Carly's head to protect Sienna, which kills her. Whilst it had been teased that Nico would kill Carly, it was not confirmed until the transmission of the following week. Carly's death also marked the beginning of Nico's serial-killing spree. Swales-Dawson teased that this was the "biggest thing" she had done on the soap since joining, whilst Passey revealed that Nico's behaviour after this would start to "really scare" Sienna.

=== Feud with Trevor ===
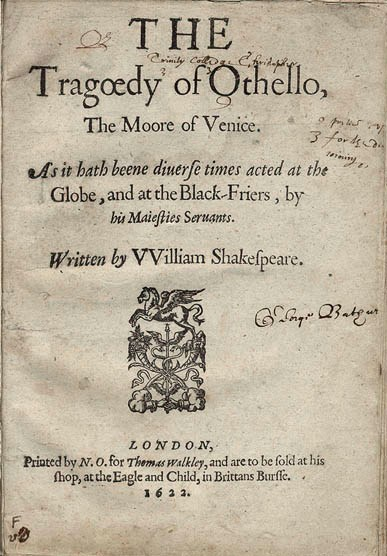
Richards compared the storyline to Othello

When Ben finds out that Carly is dead, he blames Trevor due to his link to Ashley, who Carly was hiding from, and continues to chase "the wrong leads", unaware of Sienna and Nico's involvement. Daniel Kilkelly from Digital Spy called Trevor's link to Ashley the "saving grace" of Sienna and Nico, who are "desperate" to cover up the truth. Richards explained that Ben believes that Trevor is complicit in Carly's murder and told Digital Spy, "As far as Ben is concerned, Carly's death is a result of the past catching up with them. It also becomes known that Trevor is involved in that circle of villainy, so Ben puts 2 and 2 together and makes 5". Richards teased that this would lead to a new long-running "friction" between Trevor and Ben, and it was also teased that Ben would find himself "on the wrong track" after wrongfully blaming Trevor. Richards also explained that Ben would crying on Sienna's shoulder – unaware that she is an accessory to Carly's death – and that he feels a lot of "paternal feelings" towards Nico. Richards called the story very "Shakespearean" and teased that there would be connections to Othello due to Ben's closeness to a person who is "turning the screws and being the puppetmaster". Richards also added that Ben thinks Sienna has a "lovely nature" and can only see the good in her, explaining, "The rest of the village sees her as a psycho who kidnaps people but he doesn't see that! So we've got lots of interesting and fantastic stuff to come - especially how Nico reacts to having killed someone and getting away with it". Despite Trevor and Ben being enemies, Wood and Richards got on well offscreen and often would joke around with each other. Ben later tells Sienna that he intends to adopt Nico.

Ben ends up going on an "obsessive quest" to prove that Trevor killed Carly, and he even tries to kill Trevor. The pair remain enemies and Ben even "brutally" attacks and badly injures Trevor, which causes the latter to develop post-traumatic stress and install new security, as he is worried about his safety. Digital Spy noted how the attack had changed Trevor's "usually-fearsome gangster" character. When he finds out that Ben might have been behind his attack, he is furious and goes to confront him at Hollyoaks High School, where Ben is giving a road safety talk to students. The pair "clash bitterly" and their fight causes an unwell Nico, who is "horrified" by the fight, to have a heart attack. Ben has to do CPR on Nico – which Richards described as "really awful" – and he later discovers that Nico has high levels of potassium in her system, which was the cause of death for the hospital murders, which were actually committed by Lindsey Butterfield (Sophie Austin). Due to Trevor having been a prime suspect in those murders and the fact that he was there when Nico collapsed, Ben blames Trevor for her heart attack and seeks revenge for Nico and Carly. Richards explained that Ben is already at his "wits end" due to having to attend a disciplinary hearing after he did not pass on evidence relating to Trevor's case. The hearing leads to Ben being demoted to PC, which Richards revealed makes Ben "gutted", explaining, "Ben's worked hard to make something of himself and has always believed in the law, so he's angry with himself for straying from the straight and narrow". However, Richards added that Ben still has a lot of "unfinished business" with Trevor, who he still holds a grudge with. Wanting revenge, Ben corners Trevor in the nightclub and tries to shoot him. Inside Soap hinted that Ben could commit "cold-blooded murder" to bring an end to his vendetta against Trevor. Richards believed that Ben needed to focus on someone else in order to get over Carly's death, and teased that there would be stuff coming up that would make viewers "gasp". The actor added:

"Although Ben is a good guy at heart, he's making the wrong choices for what he feels are the right reasons – and that will have serious repercussions. There's no doubt in his mind that Trevor killed his daughter, Carly. Even though Trevor has told him he's innocent time and time again, Ben just can't get past it".

Sienna and Trevor later begin an affair and fall in love, despite Sienna still being with Ben. Passey enjoyed the storyline but felt a bit sorry for Ben, and believed that it was a "shame" that Ben and Sienna had not worked out as "on paper they are right for each other and Ben can probably offer Sienna everything she needs deep down. I know he's having a bit of a crazy spell at the moment, but he is a good man - if he could just get over the revenge side of things". However, the actress argued that Sienna is "boring" with Ben and cannot be herself with him and has to "behave herself all of the" and keep secrets, and thus Passey believed that Sienna would lead a "happier, crazier life with Trevor" due to being him being more fun for her than Ben.

=== Wedding ===
Sienna and Ben's wedding aired in May 2016, despite Sienna still being obsessed with Trevor and knowing that her heart lies with him. Ben asks Jack to give Sienna away and Nico volunteers to take Jack's place as Best Man. Ben is not happy to see Trevor lingering at the wedding and the pair "square up" to each other. Sienna later glances at Trevor, who is a guest at the wedding, and cannot take her eyes off him as she walks down the aisle, knowing that she would rather be with him. In spoiler pictures, it was questioned whether Sienna would go through with the wedding or not. However, the wedding goes ahead as Sienna puts up a front: Sienna and Ben exchange vows and are declared husband and wife. However, when Nico starts crying of happiness, she looks for a tissue but ends up finding a letter from Sienna to Trevor. Sienna nevertheless marries Ben but begins having "serious doubts" about their future and is "horrified" when he suggests that they try to have a baby together. Sienna tries to avoid Ben and when he tries to "press forward" on the baby plans, Sienna flees to the hen party of Grace Black (Tamara Wall), Trevor's fiancée. Ben, who is oblivious of Sienna's feelings for Trevor, questions why Sienna is friends with Grace and becomes suspicious of his wife's behaviour, with it being hinted that he could "rumble" the affair.

=== Departure ===
In May 2016, following the airing of Ben and Sienna's wedding, it was announced that Richards would be leaving Hollyoaks as Ben at the end of his current storyline, which involved Ben being involved in the Blakes' numerous "dramas". Richards confirmed that he was leaving to star in the West End production of The Bodyguard and that he would not be returning to the soap opera afterwards; he added that he was happy to return to theatre, but was glad that he had been able to do television work too. At the time of the announcement, Richards had filmed his final scenes. Whilst it had been announced beforehand that Richards had joined the cast of The Bodyguard, it was not confirmed whether he would be departing permanently. The actor teased that Ben would have an "unhappy ending" due to the "different elements coming together", but clarified that Ben would have a "very strong finish".

In the storyline, Nico commits her third murder when she stabs Trevor on his wedding day to Grace, as she wants revenge for his affair with Sienna that "tore" her family apart. Swales-Dawson explained that Nico killed Trevor partly as "the logical thing to do - there was a problem and she sorted it out". In what Digital Spy called the "biggest shock of all", Ben finds Nico's blood-stained shirt and, whilst initially the "game appeared to be up for Nico", he decides to protect Nico, believing that she is too young to go to prison, and "confesses" to murder to himself, as he knows that he is the prime suspect anyway. It had previously been teased that Trevor would be killed-off after Hollyoaks cast members were seen filming the character's funeral. Digital Spy placed Ben as one of the suspects to have murdered him by Digital Spy. It had also been teased that Ben would be in a "bad way" after the events and that he could be headed "for trouble". Ben's final scenes aired on 27 May 2016, which saw Sienna visiting him in prison and berating him for covering up Nico's crimes; however, she lets Ben carry out his sentence and does not tell him that Carly killed Patrick and Carly and decides to report her herself. Before leaving, Sienna warns Ben that he has made the "biggest mistake of his life". Following the airing of the character's departure, Richards thanked the Hollyoaks cast and crew – in addition to viewers who had "left such nice comments" – on Twitter. Swales-Dawson told Digital Spy that she would miss Richards on the soap as he had helped her a lot and they had had a "great time". Richards revealed that he found it emotional saying goodbye to Swales-Dawson as they had enjoyed hanging out and he went into "dad mode" when he was with her.

In the aftermath, Nico is supposedly killed-off months later and her crimes were exposed, leading to Ben being released from prison off-screen. He and Sienna also divorce off-screen. In 2018, Hollyoaks aired a storyline which saw Sienna become the victim of a stalker. In the storyline, Sienna suspects that Ben is her stalker after finding evidence and makes contact with him. This led to the introduction of Ben's previously unseen police officer son, Josh Bradley (Rupert Hill), who comes to meet Sienna, who in turn thought that she had arranged to meet with Ben. The pair have an unpleasant encounter and Josh resents Sienna for her treatment of Ben, but tells her that he and Ben have no role in the stalking. Josh also reveals that Ben has been going through a difficult time due to Sienna and Nico's actions and is taking drugs to numb his pain.

== Storylines ==
Ben is first seen investigating the hit and run of Dylan Jenkins (James Fletcher). Ben is unaware that the crash involved Jason Roscoe (Alfie Browne-Sykes), who he is mentoring. Ben is revealed to have been childhood friends with Darren Osborne (Ashley Taylor Dawson) due to Ben's father being good friends with his father Jack Osborne (Jimmy McKenna), who inspired Darren to join the police force. Ben becomes attracted to Darren's ex-girlfriend Sienna Blake (Anna Passey) and tries to impress her despite being warned by Jack and Darren. Ben and Sienna begin dating and Ben moves to Hollyoaks. Despite finding out that Jason's father Rick Spencer (Victor Gardener) has been to prison, Ben still allows Jason to join the Police Force. Ben gets closer to Sienna and her daughter, Nico Blake (Persephone Swales-Dawson), but does not get on well with Sienna's father Patrick Blake (Jeremy Sheffield). Ben begins to notice that Patrick is controlling towards Sienna and his wife Maxine Minniver (Nikki Sanderson), whilst Ben suspects that Ben is hiding something.

Sienna starts to suspect that Ben is hiding something due to his secretive behaviour, which he claims is due to working overtime. Sienna suspects that Ben is having an affair with Carly (Sophie Wise), unaware that she is Ben's daughter. It is revealed that Carly is hiding from a dangerous drug dealer Ashley Davidson (Kierston Wareing), who has links to Hollyoaks resident Trevor Royle (Greg Wood), and that Ben is trying to protect Carly and get her to stay off drugs. Still unaware of Carly's true connection to Ben, Sienna and Nico go to confront Carly about having an affair with Ben. A fight breaks out between Carly and Sienna and Nico ends up killing Carly with a paperweight to protect her mum. Ben is called into work to help identify Carly's body and is devastated and shocked to find out that his daughter is dead. Sienna and Nico hide the truth about her death and Ben leans on Sienna through his grief, unaware that Nico killed his daughter.

Ben becomes convinced that Trevor is responsible for Carly's death and has a fight with him. When he is unable to get Trevor charged, Trevor goes on a revenge mission to get justice for Carly. Ben blackmails Trevor's employee Robbie Roscoe (Charlie Wernham) – who he had arrested on a drugs charge – into spying and informing on Trevor about his dodgy dealings. Ben is able to get Trevor arrested several times but he is always released, which angers Ben. Trevor is then arrested for the hospital murders, which were actually committed by Lindsey Butterfield (Sophie Austin), and Ben tries to get rid of the evidence proving that he is innocent. When Trevor is released, a furious Ben attacks Trevor in the night, which hospitalises and nearly kills him. Sienna confronts Ben and is shocked to find out that he is responsible. Trevor attacks Ben when he finds out that he was responsible, which leads to Nico almost having a heart attack. Blaming Trevor, Ben tries to shoot him but the bullet misses him. Sienna convinces Ben to not kill Trevor and to let go of his hatred, which he does.

After the shooting, Sienna and Trevor start an affair behind Grace Black (Tamara Wall) and Ben's backs. Ben proposes to Sienna, who accepts, and wants to adopt Nico. Despite falling in love with Trevor, Sienna marries Ben, but is uncomfortable when he reveals that he wants to start a family with her. Nico – who cares about Ben and is happy that he married Sienna – finds out about Sienna and Trevor's affair on the wedding day. On Trevor's own wedding day to Grace, Ben and Trevor have a fight. Nico later stabs Trevor and he dies in Grace's arms. Nico admits this to Ben and he takes the blame for it, believing that Nico is too young to go to prison and still not knowing that she killed Carly. Ben is then taken to prison. Months later, Ben is released when Nico's crimes are exposed and she seemingly is killed in a fire. Years later, Sienna suspects that Ben is her stalker. Ben's police officer son Josh Bradley (Rupert Hill) later meets with Sienna and reveals that her and Nico's actions led to him developing depression and alcoholism, which Sienna feels guilty and sorry about.

== Reception ==
"As soon as Ben Bradley set his eyes on Sienna Blake, plenty of Chester residents and Hollyoaks viewers were begging him to run for the hills. But the kindly copper ignored all the hearsay – and oblivious Ben remains convinced that he's married the woman of his dreams."

— Laura Heffernan Tyler from Inside Soap Ben (2016)

Prior to Ben's debut, Daniel Kilkelly from Digital Spy believed that Ben and Sienna's pairing would be an "unlikely new relationship" for Hollyoaks and that viewers would be left wondering whether Ben could be a "good influence" on Sienna. Richards revealed in June 2015 that Sienna and Ben's pairing had received a "really positive" reaction from viewers, and there seemed to be a "lot of love" online for the couple. That same month, Kilkelly wrote that Ben had been "settling in well" following his arrival in the village. Kilkelly also believed that it was being hinted that Ben was hiding something. Kilkelly's colleague, Sophie Dainty, called Ben and Patrick's first meeting and lunch "awkward". She also believed that Ben had stood his ground against Patrick and that Patrick had possibly "met his match" in Ben. When discussing Sienna's new love interest, Tina Campbell from Metro wrote, "To say it would take a very brave man to woo Sienna Blake is an understatement". Campbell also wrote "Oh crumbs" when Passey revealed that Sienna would go on the warpath due to Ben's secret.

Laura Heffernan from Inside Soap noted how Ben was usually a "squeaky-clean cop" despite taking "drastic action" by almost shooting Trevor. Heffernan also believed that Ben was embracing his "dark side" when he went after Trevor with a gun. After Ben attacked Trevor, Kilkelly called Ben a "cunning culprit" and believed that it would have been "unthinkable" if Ben had shot Trevor. A writer from Digital Spy placed Ben on their list of suspects that they believed would be the murderer of Trevor. They wrote that "poor old Ben's deductive skills have recently let him down in his obsessive quest to prove that Trevor is responsible for the death of his daughter Carly. His keenness on Sienna and intention to officially adopt her loathsome daughter suggest that he hasn't always got the best judgement, and he has already made one attempt on Trevor's life. Will he succeed this time?" However, they also wrote that Ben was not the "worst police officer" in the soap. Following the news that Richards would be departing as Ben, Alana Anderson from OK! questioned whether Ben would find out about Trevor and Sienna's affair. Digital Spy's Kilkelly questioned whether Ben would find out about Sienna's affair or that Nico killed his daughter. After the departure, Kilkelly called Ben going to prison for Nico's murder of Trevor a "surprising storyline twist" and a "shock decision", and he believed that Ben finding Nico's bloody shirt was the "biggest shock of all". Kilkelly questioned how Ben could be so "foolish" and added that "Hollyoaks fans know that Ben's loyalty to Nico is totally misguided" as he was unaware that Nico had killed Carly.

Victoria Wilson from What to Watch wrote how Sienna knew she was marrying the wrong man during her wedding to Ben. Her colleague Sandra Powell agreed, writing how Sienna was in not in a rush to get married as she knew that she was marrying the wrong man. Powell called Sienna and Ben's wedding the "wedding of the year" but joked that having Trevor as a guest would be awkward. Powell also questioned whether Sienna would go through the wedding or instead "humiliate Ben and break his heart in spectacular style". Powell also believed that Ben looked "dapper" in his suit, though added that he was "simmering" when he found out that Trevor was a guest. Duncan Lindsay also wrote that Sienna Metro was marrying the wrong man and speculated that the day could end in "disaster" and that Sienna and Trevor's affair could be exposed.

In 2018, a storyline played out which saw Sienna become the victim of a mystery stalker, and Sophie Dainty from Digital Spy theorised that it could be Ben, writing, "He may not have had a bad bone in his body back then, but could a prison stint have left Ben gunning for revenge? It's possible!" She added that whilst Sienna had done some "pretty deplorable things" during her time on the soap, her "treatment of poor Ben Bradley was another matter altogether" due to cheating on him with Trevor and covering up Nico's murder of Carly. Sarah Ellis from Inside Soap speculated that Ben was Sienna's stalker. Kilkelly also speculated that Ben could be Sienna's stalker due to Josh revealing that Ben was going through a hard time and taking drugs. Kilkelly also noted how Ben had a "turbulent year" with Sienna, particularly when Carly was killed.
