= Nico Blake =

Fictional character from Hollyoaks

- Hollyoaks character
- Portrayed by: Persephone Swales-Dawson
- Duration: 2014–2016, 2018, 2020
- First appearance: Episode 3880; 6 June 2014
- Last appearance: Episode 5448; 15 December 2020
- Introduced by: Bryan Kirkwood
In-universe information
- Other names: Sophie Blake; Nico Bradley
- Occupation: Student
- Father: Dodger Savage
- Mother: Sienna Blake
- Adoptive father: Ben Bradley
- Half-brothers: Sebastian Blake
- Half-sisters: Sophie Blake; Myra-Pocahontas Savage-McQueen
- Daughters: Tori Devine-Banks
- Grandfathers: Jeremy Blake
- Grandmothers: Anna Blake
- Uncles: Dodger Savage; Will Savage
- Aunts: Sienna Blake; Liberty Savage
- First cousins: Myra-Pocahontas Savage-McQueen; Sebastian Blake; Sophie Blake; Faith
- Other relatives: Minnie Minniver; Patrick Blake; Dilly Harcourt

Nico Blake (also Bradley) is a fictional character from the British Channel 4 soap opera Hollyoaks, played by Persephone Swales-Dawson. The character made her first screen appearance during the episode broadcast on 6 June 2014. The character and casting was announced on 20 May 2014. Nico is the daughter and niece of established twins characters Dodger Savage (Danny Mac) and Sienna Blake (Anna Passey), the adoptive daughter of Sienna's boyfriend Ben Bradley (Ben Richards), and the granddaughter of Sienna and Dodger's parents Jeremy Blake (Jeremy Sheffield) and Anna Blake (Saskia Wickham) and the niece of their half-brother Will Savage (James Atherton) and their half-sister Liberty Savage (Abi Phillips/Jessamy Stoddart), and a half-sister and cousin of Dodger's daughter Myra-Pocahontas Savage-McQueen.

Nico's prominent storylines include: a fraught relationship with Sienna and Patrick; kidney failure from the "End of the Line" train crash; discovering that Dodger is actually her biological father; a relationship with Dylan Jenkins (James Fletcher); accidentally killing Ben's daughter, Carly Bradley (Sophie Wise) with a paperweight; her crush on Jason Roscoe (Alfie Browne-Sykes) and stalking his girlfriend Holly Cunningham (Amanda Clapham); coldly murdering Patrick, who is terminally ill, by smothering him; attempting to murder Theresa McQueen (Jorgie Porter) for her kidney; pushing Will off the hospital roof; stabbing Sienna; suffering a heart attack when she requires another kidney transplant; murdering Dylan's father Trevor Royle (Greg Wood) by stabbing him on his wedding day to Grace Black (Tamara Wall); bullying cancer patient Jade Albright (Kassius Nelson) with her friend Peri Lomax (Ruby O'Donnell), whom she later develops an unhealthy obsession with and holds hostage.

Nico was seemingly killed off on 1 November 2016, as part of the show's "Halloween Spooktacular" episodes. Nico becomes trapped in a maze by a fire and fallen debris after a final showdown with Sienna, which was caused by Peri's father, Cameron Campbell (Cameron Moore), after he discovers Nico's psychotic tendencies. She made an unannounced return on 15 May 2018, when she was revealed as Sienna's stalker. Following her return, her storylines included seemingly killing Sienna, however Sienna faked her own death in order to catch Nico; revealing herself to be heavily pregnant; attempting to kill Peri's friend Harley Frater (Mollie Lambert); holding Peri and Harley hostage; giving birth to her daughter and being killed by Sienna in self-defence. In 2020, Nico made several appearances as hallucinations to Liberty, who struggles with postnatal depression after giving birth to Faith.

== Casting ==
The casting of Nico was announced on 20 May 2014. Daniel Kilkelly from Digital Spy reported that Nico arrives in Hollyoaks and meets Dodger Savage (Danny Mac). He takes pity on her and gives her food. A show spokesperson added "Is this girl just a passing tearaway teenager? Or could there perhaps be something more?" It was soon announced that Nico is the long-lost daughter of Sienna Blake (Anna Passey). But Patrick Blake (Jeremy Sheffield) intervenes to ruin Nico and Sienna's chances of becoming acquainted. His scams include paying Nico's adoptive mother Denise (Janet Bamford) to trick Sienna into believing someone else is her daughter. When Nico tells Sienna that she is her daughter she is dismissed as a liar. This prompts Nico to begin a revenge campaign.

== Development ==
=== Characterisation ===
According to Channel 4's official Hollyoaks page Nico is "intelligent, funny, but with quite a dark streak", as well as being quite mature for her age, as a result from going to care home to care home. It also mentions that although Nico has a tendency to push people away, this is down to a fear of rejection and in reality she just wants "to be loved and to be a part of a real family" and that she is "looking for a place in the world."

In an interview at the British Soap Awards 2015, Anna Passey commented that Sienna had "spawned a devil child". It was also noted by Daniel Kilkelly, that Nico would begin to show a dark streak. This was later confirmed to be true, when Sienna confronted her regarding the murder of Carley, Patrick and Trevor, Nico refused to believe that she had done anything wrong, demonstrating true psychopathic behaviour. Persephone Swale-Dawson later commented that Nico was developing a "sinister streak."

=== Parentage ===
Nico arrives in the village as the long-lost daughter of Sienna Blake. Although she knows that Sienna is her mother, Sienna believes otherwise due to her being told by her father, Patrick, that her daughter is someone else. Although Sienna, initially disbelieves Nico, she starts investigating her claim after suspecting that she has something to do with Nancy Osborne (Jessica Fox) finding out about her new job, which leads to Sienna finally recognizing that Nico is her daughter.

Upon their reunion, Anna Passey noted that their reunion wasn't what Sienna was expecting, and that when she finds out that Patrick threatened Nico to stay away, Sienna would be heartbroken. Passey also commented how both characters would have an interesting time ahead of them as neither of them is what the other one was expecting, with Passey noting how Sienna isn't "necessarily mum material!" Hollyoaks producer Bryan Kirkwood also refused to answer whether Sienna and Nico would be able to keep their happily ever after.

On 5 August 2014, it was announced that Nico would begin searching for her true father after deciding that he would be a better carer to live with due to Sienna's latest malicious act. However, it was hinted that Nico's search could end in peril as she believes Sienna's lies about her father being called Ben Baxter and agrees to meet up with a man bearing that name. On 4 September 2014, it was announced that Dodger Savage (Danny Mac), Sienna's twin brother, was Nico's father. It was discover that Dodger and Sienna had met briefly years ago, and slept together, without knowing they were twins. A spokesperson told Digital Spy today: "Sienna and Dodger were estranged as children and each did not discover they had a twin until adulthood. When Nico was conceived 14 years ago, it was a chance meeting and they did not know that they were related." In an interview with Danny Mac, conducted at the Inside Soap Awards 2014, Daniel Kilkelly noted how some fans loved the twist with Dodger being Nico's father, whereas others hated it. Danny Mac commented that when Dodger finds out he will feel "physically sick", as he never could have "thought this could have been possible." He also said that Dodger would strive to do the right thing, even if he didn't know what that was. In an interview with Digital Spy, Bryan Kirkwood stated that Dodger being the father of Nico had been discussed "right from the start", and that they pushed Dodger being the father due to the audience thinking that it was going to be Patrick, Sienna's father.

=== Murder of Carly Bradley ===
In early August 2015, Nico murdered Carly Bradley (Sophie Wise) while protecting her mother Sienna. It was announced afterwards that Nico would go on a dark streak, though Persephone Swales-Dawson admitted that she always knew that Nico would go down a dark path, she didn't think it'd be something "on the level of this!" It was also announced that Sienna would become scared of Nico, with Anna Passey commenting that Sienna would start wondering "What on earth have I [Sienna] created?"

=== Departure ===
On 1 November 2016, Nico was killed off as part of the show's "autumn stunt week" set at a Halloween Spooktacular. Nico was in the maze with her mother Sienna when Cameron Campbell (Cameron Moore) set it on fire, hoping to get revenge on Nico for almost killing Peri. Both Nico and Sienna became trapped by debris and Sienna's partner Warren Fox (Jamie Lomas) made the decision to save Sienna instead of Nico. The maze then collapses with Nico still inside. In a video released by the show following the episode's broadcast, Swales-Dawson commented "Nico might be gone, but I've had fun playing her. I think the thing I'm going to miss most about Hollyoaks is the crazy storylines."

Nico was killed off once again by her mother Sienna Blake, after hitting her over the head with a door stopper. Nico departed the serial on 22 June 2018.

=== Return (2018) ===
In January 2018, an unknown culprit began stalking Sienna and after months of psychological torture and anguish, in May 2018 it was revealed that Nico was Sienna's stalker, having survived the structure fire in November 2016.

== Storylines ==
=== 2014–2016 ===
Nico arrives in the village and steals food from Dodger. He tries to help her out and she steals a bracelet belonging to Sienna. Nico is injured when Jason Roscoe (Alfie Browne-Sykes) throws bricks through Dodger's window. She later causes a fight with Jason and later Holly Cunningham (Amanda Clapham). She befriends Leela Lomax (Kirsty-Leigh Porter) to get closer to Sienna. She overhears Sienna telling Leela that she has found her daughter, but is disheartened to find out that Sienna believes it to be someone else. Unbeknownst to Nico, Patrick has manipulated Sienna into believing her daughter is elsewhere. Nico tells Sienna the truth but she slaps her and calls her a liar. Feeling rejected Nico reignites an old feud between Sienna and Nancy Osborne (Jessica Fox). Nico then attacks Nancy and plants Sienna's bracelet at the scene to frame her. Sienna eventually discovers that Nico is her true daughter and happily welcomes her into the family.

When Nico begins asking questions about her father's identity, Sienna becomes hostile towards her and asks her to stop asking questions. Nico then confides in her friend, Peri Lomax (Ruby O'Donnell) about Sienna, and makes hurtful comments about her, just as Sienna enters the room. Sienna then decides to tell Nico about her father, and explains that he went into the army and when he returned, he wanted nothing more to do with Sienna or Nico. Nico then begins searching for her father, but Dodger realises that Sienna made his identity up after finding an author of the same name. In September, Patrick tells Sienna that Dodger is Nico's father, but Sienna keeps this from her. Nico has an argument with Sienna and they fall out, which leads to Nico boarding the McQueens' party train which also contains the McQueens, which crashes causing Nico to become injured. She is admitted to hospital, where Dr. Charles S'avage (Andrew Greenough) tells Sienna and Dodger that Nico was born with one kidney, that is failing and will need a transplant, but that Sienna and Dodger do not match Nico's kidney. Sienna is upset by this and turns for help. Theresa McQueen (Jorgie Porter) then tells Dodger that she will be tested to help Nico.

Theresa is found to be a match to help Nico and they go through with the transplant which is successful. Peri then starts looking through Patrick's things on Nico's request so she may find something that will reveal who her dad is. When Peri finds a Christmas card Nico falsely assumes Patrick is her dad and confronts him, but Dodger tells her he is her dad shocking everyone in the Dog. Dodger told Nico that he and Sienna were separated when they were young, and they didn't recognize that he ends up in pregnant his own twin sister. Nico then tells Sienna she wants to go back into care, so Sienna kidnaps her and holds her hostage at her late mother's house along with Dodger. Nico manages to escape but in the process bangs her head. In February, Nico's uncle Will Savage (James Atherton) kidnaps her and attempts to kill her, so he can cause Dodger grief, but Nico pushes him off of the hospital roof. Dodger takes the blame for Nico and flees the country. When Will regains conscious he tells the police she pushed him, but before he can make a formal statement he is murdered by the Gloved Hand Killer. Nico is questioned by police over what Will said but Patrick tells her to do what Dodger did and say it was him. Nico takes illegal painkillers that Peri stole off Nancy which causes her to be hospitalized but she recovers. Later, when Nico finds Sienna's clothes in Dylan's belongings, she thinks Dylan is obsessed with her mother, so she angrily leaves Sienna to die when she suffers an allergic reaction from a bee sting. But then Dylan tells her the reason he took the top was because he was a cross-dresser, Nico runs to hospital, but because Dr. S'avage alerted social services to what she did, she is taken into care. She eventually moves back in with Sienna but poisons her soup as revenge. However Nico ends up eating the poisoned soup. She makes a full recovery and reconciles with Sienna.

Nico kills Carly Bradley (Sophie Wise) when she sees her attacking Sienna. Sienna helps her cover up the crime. Later, Sienna and Nico find out that Carly was Sienna's boyfriend, Ben Bradley's (Ben Richards) daughter after he told them about Carly's death. The next day, Nico was arrested for Carly's murder after her phone was found at Ben's house where Carly died. Later, she was released by the police. Two weeks later Nico finally tells Maxine Minniver (Nikki Sanderson) the truth about Carly's death. Nico also tells Dylan on the day he is sentenced to six months for dealing in legal highs. Dylan promises to keep Carly's death a secret before his death. Whilst Dylan was being murdered by the Gloved Hand Killer in Dee Valley Hospital, Nico was talking to Peri about being able to wait three months to see Dylan again when he gets released on license, Nico doesn't realise that Dylan was involved in an accident or he had died in hospital. When she hears the news of his death, Nico becomes distraught and confronts Trevor about his mistreatment towards Dylan. She helps Trevor by choosing what Dylan should be buried with and asks if she could have his phone. Nico then realizes that a mystery culprit was tormenting Dylan in his final days and presumes that it is Kyle Bigsby (Mitchell Hunt) so she punches him. Nico continue to message Dylan's tormentor unaware it's actually Kim Butterfield (Daisy Wood-Davis). Kim later tells Nico that it was her tormenting Dylan, Nico tells Dylan's father, Trevor Royle (Greg Wood) about it, but when he doesn't act upon it she decides that he didn't care enough about Dylan, so she frames him for Carly's murder and has him arrested.

Nico then locks Sienna in her room and starts a fire in the flat in order to make Ben see how much she means to him. However she panics that her plan backfired when Sienna isn't breathing, but she makes a full recovery. However, when Sienna points out that she is the reason they can't move forward due to her behavior, she books herself into a physiatrist and reveals to Sienna that she has kept Carly's ring, to remind herself that she is a monster. Sienna takes the ring off her, saying Carly's death was an accident, but they are seen with the ring by Trevor, unaware that Carly had stolen it off Ashley Davidson. Ashley later targets Sienna and Nico and kidnaps them, when Ashley attempts to hurt Nico, Sienna knocks her out with a gas can. Nico then freaks out saying its Carly all over again, but Sienna manages to calm her down.

Newcomer Alfie Nightingale (Richard Linnell) tries to befriend Nico by setting off a bunch of fireworks off the bridge, however the sparks set off the box and almost fall on top of her, but Jason Roscoe manages to save her. She is touched when he listens to her as she talks about Dylan's death and how it made her feel. His actions cause her to develop a crush on him, and when she sees his evidence board about the Gloved Hand Killers victims while returning his wallet, she decides to help. She then accuses Kim of being the killer, due to the way she treated Dylan just before his death, unaware the killer is her sister Lindsey. Nico's crush on Jason grows stronger and this leads to her setting up his girlfriend, Holly, in order to spend time alone with him. Nico then finds a bunch of flowers in her locker identical to the ones she saw Jason buying earlier, leading her to believe that he feels the same way, unaware they're actually from Alfie. Nico later attacks Holly in her home but Jason walks in and stops her.

In January 2016, Nico is shocked when she discovers that Patrick is planning on framing Maxine for his murder and agrees to help. She is furious when she finds out that Patrick left Ben a video telling him that Nico killed Carly. She confronts Patrick and knowing that all the evidence will point towards Maxine, she picks up a pillow and apologizes to Patrick before smothering him. She is shocked when Patricks body disappears but is relieved when the police find his wheelchair on top of a cliff.

Nico stops taking her anti-rejection medication and needs a new kidney transplant. She plans on killing Theresa for her kidney. While Theresa is running Nico a bath, Nico stands menacingly behind her contemplating on pushing her in but her plan fails. She spikes a bottle of wine and plans on giving it to Theresa. Nico is annoyed when she has to have a dialysis instead of going to Peri's party. Theresa surprises Nico with her own two person party and Nico has a change of heart about killing her, but Theresa finds the bottle and drinks it and Nico panics when she collapses. Sienna finds Theresa and calls an ambulance and convinces Nico that she won't get caught. Theresa is taken to hospital and survives and Sienna gets rid of the evidence. Frightened, she calls Ben and tells him that Nico is out of control which Nico overhears. Angry that Sienna betrayed her, Nico attacks Sienna with the bottle smashing it. Sienna apologizes to Nico and they hug. Nico tells Sienna that she stabbed her in the back like Patrick did and stabs Sienna with a broken piece of glass leaving Sienna bleeding heavily. Nico leaves Sienna to die but she is found by Grace Black (Tamara Wall) and Trevor and is taken to hospital and makes a full recovery. Sienna forgives Nico for stabbing her and they agree to forget all about it.

Nico is delighted when Sienna and Ben get married, however, her happiness is short lived when she discovers that Sienna was having an affair with Trevor. Angry that Trevor almost ripped her family apart, she unexpectedly turns up at the church to give him a good luck hug before stabbing him in the chest. Instead of calling an ambulance, Trevor painfully goes through the wedding with Grace before collapsing in her arms dying, leaving Grace, as well as Sienna, distraught. Ben finds out that Nico is responsible for killing Trevor and confesses to the crime to protect his stepdaughter unaware of her other murders. Sienna pays a visit to Ben in prison and demands to know why he killed the love of her life. Ben tells Sienna that it was Nico, shocking Sienna. Sienna decides to report Nico to the police, prompting a terrified Nico to flee the village with the help if Maxine, who she blackmailed because Nico knew that she buried Patrick's body.

Nico returns a few weeks later and it is revealed that she is working with the police to send Maxine to prison for Patrick's murder, much to Sienna's shock. Sienna tries to convince DS Gavin Armstrong (Andrew Hayden-Smith) that they cannot believe a word that Nico says. When they are alone, Nico persuades Sienna to help get Maxine sent down for Patrick's murder, but Sienna is still angry at Nico for killing Trevor. Nico confronts Maxine at the flat and accuses her of being responsible for Patrick's death. She tries to kill Maxine with a trophy but Sienna saves her and shouts at Nico to get out. Sienna and Nico later meet up and it turns out that there working together to send Maxine to prison.

When Tom becomes close with his foster sister Jade Albright (Kassius Nelson), Peri becomes jealous and starts bullying her, alongside Nico. Nico and Peri decide to set Jade and Alfie up on a date and Nico deliberately gives Jade an awful makeover. Alfie is surprised by Jade's makeover, leaving Jade upset. Alfie spills lemonade on Peri's clothes so she changed into one of Alfie's T-shirts. Jade is shocked to see Peri in Alfie's T-shirt and she lies saying that her and Alfie had sex. Jade is furious but later discovers what Nico and Peri are doing. Just as Jade goes up on the stage at the school assembly, Nico pulls of Jade's wig, leaving her humiliated and self-conscious. Believing the wig stunt was a step to far, Peri starts to feel guilty and reports Nico to the headteacher Sally St. Claire (Annie Wallace) and Nico is expelled. Nico discovers that Peri told on her and as revenge, she persuades Peri to go on a camping trip with her in the woods. In the woods, Nico deliberately locks them in an abandoned bunker and when Peri realises that there trapped, she screams for help. Nico begins scaring her with horror stories and later reveals that she purposely locked them up as revenge for Peri getting her expelled. When Peri bangs on the door for help, the ceiling collapses on her, knocking her unconscious. She awakens, but passes out again from dehydration. Peri and Nico are later found by Leela, Sienna, Cameron Campbell (Cameron Moore) and Warren Fox (Jamie Lomas).

Nico develops an unhealthy obsession with Peri. She tries to kiss Peri but she rejects her, saying that they are friends and nothing more. As Peri runs away, she stumbles onto Patrick's corpse. When Jade tells Tom that Peri bullied her, he tells Peri to never talk to him again. Assuring Peri that she will make Tom forgive her, Nico gives Peri aftershave that she poisoned, to give to Tom. In a special Point of view week of episodes focusing entirely on Patrick's murder investigation, Peri discovers that Nico poisoned Tom. Although she denied it, Peri tried to put on the aftershave but Nico knocked it out of her hand. She explains that she did it for Peri and contemplates on telling her about Patrick but is interrupted by Nancy before she can say anything. Nico tells the police that she thinks Sienna killed Patrick and when they are alone, Sienna asks Nico who put her up to this before realising that it was Nico who murdered Patrick. Sienna confessed to the crime to protect Nico and is charged with murder.

In October 2016, Nico becomes annoyed when Cameron won't let Peri go out. As revenge, Peri spikes his drink but stops him from drinking it. They plan to trap him in the lift but they accidentally trap a pregnant Maxine. Maxine collapses and is rushed to hospital, but is told that she miscarried, leaving Nico and Peri feeling guilty.

Nico's obsession of Peri spirals out of control. She drugs and kidnaps Peri, locking her in the bunker again. Peri begs Nico to let her go but she refuses. Nico confesses all of her crimes to Peri, scaring her. Maxine and Warren, who now know that Nico is Patrick's real killer, convince Sienna to tell the police the truth. Sienna is released from prison and the police begin a manhunt for Nico. Nico turns her attentions to Tom and targets him at the "Halloween Spooktacular". Peri is found and taken to hospital where she tells Leela and Cameron about Nico's crimes, infuriating Cameron who vows revenge. While the police search for Nico, she traps Tom in the tent and blames him for getting in the way of her and Peri.

She attacks Tom with a globe but Tom's sister Jude Cunningham (Davinia Taylor) pushes her off him, knocking her unconscious. The police go in to get Nico but she disappears and Sienna sees her going into the maze and follows her in. Cameron also witnesses her go in and he sets the maze on fire as revenge. Sienna finds her and they have a heart to heart. However, Sienna refers to Nico as Sophie and Nico angrily tells her that she's Nico and that she's not her daughter.

Sienna notices the fire and they try to escape. Nico kicks down a wall but a different wall collapses on top of them trapping them. Warren comes to rescue them. He rescues Sienna, however, she begs Warren to save Nico. She tells Nico that she loves her but Nico heartlessly replies saying that she hates her. Warren and Sienna escape and the crowd watch in horror as the maze collapses down on top of Nico.

=== 2018 ===
After being stalked by an unknown person for weeks, Sienna's computer is hacked with a countdown clock. Once it reaches zero, there's a knock at the door and Sienna opens its and finds a toy monkey in the hallway. She goes outside to find who delivered it but can't see anyone. Upon returning to the flat, she finds a hooded figure holding Sebastian who is revealed to be Nico. A shocked Sienna confronts Nico and Nico tells her how she escaped the fire. Sienna calls Joel Dexter (Rory Douglas-Speed) for help but Cleo McQueen (Nadine Rose Mulkerrin) answers it and doesn't believe Sienna. An angry Nico attacks Sienna and stabs her before escaping. Nico is spotted by Myra McQueen (Nicole Barber-Lane) but disappears. Sienna comes out and hands Sebastian to Joel before collapsing. At the hospital, Sienna goes into cardiac arrest and dies.

The police decide to use Sienna's funeral to catch Nico. At first, Joel and Myra refuse but decide to go along with it. Nico takes Sebastian from the hospital when he is taken there by Sally after falling ill. Nico heads to the hospital roof since the police had swarmed the hospital. She is being followed by someone dressed in black, who is revealed to be Sienna, still alive. She had been working with the police, including Ben's son Josh Bradley (Rupert Hill) to catch Nico.

Sienna confronts Nico on the rooftop and demands that she hands over Sebastian. Sienna persuades Nico to hand herself in but Nico pulls down her jumper and reveals that she is heavily pregnant. Nico begs Sienna to help her change and to be a better person, but before she can say anything, Warren shows up. Warren forces Sienna to choose between him and the twins or Nico. An emotional Sienna tells Nico that she needs to face justice, but Nico is furious and tries to push her off the roof. Warren takes Sebastian and runs before locking the door. Josh heads to the roof but Sienna and Nico are nowhere to be seen. It is revealed that Sienna is hiding a pregnant Nico at her flat.

Nico is angry when she discovers that Peri has a new friend called Harley Frater (Mollie Lambert). Nico goes to Harley's birthday party and since it is a fancy dress party no one recognises her. She overhears an argument between Peri and Harley and confronts Harley outside. She tries to push Harley down the steps but is interrupted by Peri. Sienna witnesses this and takes Nico home. Believing Nico to be a danger to herself, Sienna locks her in her room. Nico becomes bored inside her room so Sienna suggests that she goes knitting. While they are knitting, she hides a needle up her sleeve. Later, she unlocks the door with the needle and tries to escape but Joel arrives so she hides. Nico knocks something so Sienna kisses Joel to distract him. Sienna takes Nico for her scan and Nico is worried that her baby is dead. The baby is fine but they are alarmed when the nurse leaves to check something so Sienna follows her. When Sienna comes back, Nico is gone. Nico spies on Peri and Harley and when they are alone in the garage, Nico knocks out Harley and ties them up. Nico tries to persuade Peri to run away with her but Harley wakes up and calls her mad, making Nico angry. Peri refuses to leave with her, so Nico leaves to get her some "farewell flowers" like she gave to Tom. When she leaves the garage, she goes into labour. She rushes home to Sienna and Sienna helps deliver the baby which she calls Victoria. Nico tells the baby that in the morning she will kill Peri which Sienna overhears. Sienna confronts Nico over this and Nico threatens her. Sienna calls Joel and when he arrives she hands him Victoria and tells him to take her to the hospital. Nico comes out of her room and is furious when she discovers that Sienna gave away her baby. She attacks Sienna but Leela comes in and pulls her off Sienna but accidentally pushes her against a table. Nico wakes up and screams "I hate You" at Sienna and pushes Leela. She stands over Sienna and tries to kill her with a glass vase, but Sienna hits her with a doorstep, killing her.

A distraught Sienna decides to call the police but Leela convinces her to move to Spain like she planned. Sienna agrees and says goodbye to Victoria in the hospital. She meets up with Josh in the village and confesses to killing Nico. Sienna is arrested for her murder, but is eventually released when it is declared self-defence.

== Reception ==
In an interview with Digital Spy, Anna Passey commented that Persephone Swales-Dawson was "fabulous", and "believable as Sienna's daughter". Nico's parentage storyline was nominated by All About Soap as part of its "Best Soap Moments Of 2014 awards". Swales-Dawson won the accolade of "Best Bad Girl" at The Inside Soap Awards 2016. A reporter writing for the Inside Soap Yearbook included Nico's attempt at murdering Tom by poisoned aftershave in their "A to Z" list, noting that it was "a soap first", before praising her for her "psychopathic ingenuity" Nico's return was nominated for Biggest OMG Soap moment at the 2018 Digital Spy Reader Awards; it came in sixth place with 7.5% of the total votes.

== See also ==
- List of soap opera villains
