= Patrick Blake (Hollyoaks) =

UK soap opera character (created 2012)

- Hollyoaks character
- Portrayed by: Jeremy Sheffield
- Duration: 2012–2016, 2024
- First appearance: Episode 3478; 21 November 2012
- Last appearance: Episode 6317; 23 February 2024
- Introduced by: Bryan Kirkwood (2012); Hannah Cheers and Angelo Abela (2024)
In-universe information
- Occupation: Headteacher
- Father: Charles Blake
- Mother: Martha Blake
- Brothers: Jeremy Blake
- Wife: Anna Blake (until 2013); Maxine Minniver (2014–2016)
- Daughters: Minnie Minniver; Dilly Harcourt
- Stepsons: Dodger Savage
- Stepdaughters: Sienna Blake
- Nephews: Dodger Savage
- Nieces: Sienna Blake
- Other relatives: Sebastian Blake; Nico Blake; Myra-Pocahontas Savage-McQueen; Sophie Blake; Tori Devine-Banks

Patrick Blake is a fictional character from the British Channel 4 soap opera Hollyoaks, played by Jeremy Sheffield. He made his first screen appearance on 21 November 2012. The character's introduction to the serial and Sheffield's casting were announced on 7 October 2012. Patrick is introduced as the biological father of established character Dodger Savage (Danny Mac). It was announced in December 2023 that Patrick would be returning to Hollyoaks in an unknown capacity.

Patrick's storylines have involved finding out that Dodger is his biological son, who he long thought was dead; a relationship with Maxine Minniver (Nikki Sanderson), whom he abuses and fathered her daughter, Minnie Minniver (Eva Lorente); being kidnapped by his stepson Will Savage (James Atherton); keeping his daughter, Sienna Blake (Anna Passey) locked up, as well as trying to prevent her from finding her biological daughter Nico Blake (Persephone Swales-Dawson); and being diagnosed with motor neurone disease. Patrick departed the show on 5 January 2016 after being murdered in a shocking twist by Nico. Sheffield briefly reprised his role as Patrick weeks later on 2 February 2016 when Maxine momentarily saw him as a figment of her imagination, much to her horror. On 9 September 2016, after Sienna was charged with his murder, she imagined spending Christmas with him.

== Casting ==
It was announced on 7 October 2012 that Jeremy Sheffield would be playing Patrick Blake. Of his casting, Sheffield said: "I'm very happy to be joining Hollyoaks at a time when things are getting very exciting". Danny Mac, who played Dodger Savage, commented on the character saying that Dodger "needs to find out who his father is and get some questions answered." In December 2023, it was announced that Patrick would make a comeback in 2024, although it was not explained how. He returns in episodes 6316 and 6317, originally broadcast on 22 February and 23 February 2024.

It was announced on 3 May 2024 that Hollyoaks will "make a first" as Sheffield is cast as Jez Blake, the estranged twin-brother of Patrick. Along with Jez, Patrick's estranged mother Martha Blake (Sherrie Hewson) are both set to make their debuts in spring 2024.

== Development ==
Blake's character is introduced when Dodger decides to find Patrick. Danny Mac said that Dodger is "shocked" when he finds Patrick as his house is "huge with expensive cars on the driveway. It's the opposite to the place where Dodger grew up". Mac added that Dodger sees a girl when visiting Patrick who he learns is Patrick's daughter. Dodger is "struck by what a decent, charming, handsome bloke" Patrick is and reveals he is his son. Patrick does not give Dodger the reaction he was hoping for and is "adamant that his son Mark - which is Dodger's real name - is dead, because that's what Dodger's mum Anna (Saskia Wickham) told him years ago. It's an afternoon of bombshells because after Dodger proves his real identity, Patrick reveals Sienna is his twin sister". Mac explained that Patrick and Sienna later arrive in the village and try to build a relationship with Dodger. A writer for the official Hollyoaks website said "Patrick is a strong, conservative, disciplinarian head-teacher. However, the man that the world knows may not be the same behind closed doors..." When Jeremy Sheffield appeared on Lorraine, he commented that Patrick was "nice", "intelligent, successful", but also said that "there's a whole other side to him which I'm not going to tell you."

In an interview with Digital Spy, Sheffield said that he wanted to play a character "who is believable, but can also be horrifically evil at times", he also said he wanted Patrick to be seen as someone "who could be your neighbour, your child's headmaster, or somebody who lives around the corner."

=== Domestic violence ===
Patrick's abusive nature was first revealed during the introduction of Anna, where it was revealed that Anna would tell her children that Patrick was an abusive partner, and that is why she ran away with Dodger. Patrick's abusive nature is then seen, when he intimidates Anna into scaring away Dodger and Sienna by claiming that she does not know who her real children actually are. Jeremy Sheffield said of his abuse toward Anna that dominance is what Patrick "strives for in all of his relationships and all aspects of his life", and commented that his character saw this as "completely normal" instead of abusive.

After initially being nice toward Maxine, Patrick eventually started showing his sinister side toward her by first reveling in her failure as a coffee shop manager, before grabbing her wrist as he feels that she had embarrassed him due to her trying to dance with him. Daniel Kilkelly wrote, "how this would look set to create problems for the couple over the coming weeks." It was announced on 22 October 2013 that Patrick would start domestically abusing Maxine after discovering her one-night stand with Patrick's son, Dodger. Nikki Sanderson, who plays Maxine, commented that the storyline had been subtlety brewing over the past few months with Patrick buying her house, alienating her from her friends and forcing her to quit her job. Sanderson later commented in an interview that Patrick twists it in his head to make it Maxine's fault so that he may feel remorse, but not blame. Later when Maxine fell pregnant, Patrick continued his abuse against her with Sanderson commenting that "Just because Maxine is expecting a baby, it doesn't mean the abuse will stop. It's a horrible situation." In the build-up to their wedding, when Maxine rejects Patrick he breaks down. Jeremy Sheffield commented that whilst he is using emotional blackmail, the breakdown is "genuine". He also reveals that the reason Patrick abuses his partners is because "everybody he loves leaves him. Whenever he's close to anyone he has to be in control of them because he has too much fear he'll be rejected."

Christian Today reported that the domestic abuse storyline "should challenge us all" it was also written "Hollyoaks couple Maxine Minniver and Patrick Blake are at the centre of what has been described as "one of the UK Soap's darkest storylines"." Speaking to the Mirror, Nikki Sanderson (Maxine Minniver) said that the storyline has helped real victims.

During the storyline, several adverts, both digital and radio, were produced to highlight the issue of domestic violence. The soap also created a timeline on their official Facebook page to highlight key moments in the storyline. Lee Mason, the drama commissioning editor at Channel 4, commented that the aim of the adverts was to "help broaden the awareness of the 'This Is Abuse' campaign with our younger audience." Another advert later aired, showing Patrick rape Maxine. The advert's intention was to highlight that rape can happen within relationships, with Crime Prevention Minister Norman Baker saying that the advert "will encourage teenagers to re-think their views about rape, consent, violence and abuse." Chief Executive Officer of the NSPCC, Peter Wanless said that "too many young people assume violence or emotional abuse is a normal part of relationships. It's vital that we get the message across that it isn't right." Although, the majority of the storyline was well received, Daniel Kilkelly criticized the lack of fallout against Patrick, saying that "most of the village barely batted an eyelid" and that the only reaction was "Darren, who inexplicably decided that this was the best possible moment for Patrick to become his best friend."

=== Motor Neurone Disease ===
On 29 March 2015, it was announced that an upcoming storyline would see Patrick diagnosed with the incurable condition of motor neuron disease. Patrick would reveal his condition to his secretary, Theresa McQueen (Jorgie Porter) in emotional scenes airing in early April. Prior to the announcement, it was shown on-screen that Patrick was hiding a medical condition, after threatening Dr. Charles S'avage (Andrew Greenough). Patrick will choose to keep the truth over his condition a secret from Maxine so that he does not ruin his chances of securing custody of their daughter, Minnie. As the storyline continues, Patrick will find the secret very hard to keep. It was also announced that following the conclusion of the storyline, Sheffield would be leaving the programme as Patrick will die. However, producers are not revealing when and how Patrick leaves. Motor neurone disease is a disorder that heavily affects the brain and spinal cord and attacks the movement nerves. It will leave Patrick unable to move, talk, and after a period of time, breathe.

Sheffield spoke about how "honoured" he was to be involved in some of the show's biggest storylines and how he wishes Patrick's new storyline will "captivate people's hearts and minds." Speaking of his final storyline, Sheffield said: "Patrick recognises his symptoms of MND, but he is in denial. Having seen his father deteriorate and die of the same illness, he is unable and unwilling to fully accept the truth. He endeavours to keep his diagnosis secret, as admitting the truth could jeopardise his chance of getting full custody of his beloved baby daughter Minnie. "For Patrick the idea of not being in control, of relinquishing his power is unthinkable and it will be interesting to see how the man who needs to control everything and everyone in his life copes with something that he cannot influence. Working with the Motor Neurone Disease Association has proved invaluable for researching this role."

The CEO of the MND Association, Sally Light, spoke of the storyline: "It's been a great year for raising awareness of motor neurone disease. Following on from the success of the Ice Bucket Challenge last summer and the film release of The Theory of Everything, I'm sure that Hollyoaks will show the reality of living with MND on the small screen too. It's vital that we educate a young audience. Some of them will have done the Ice Bucket Challenge and now through the drama unfolding week by week will realise the devastating impact of MND and just why that was so important. I know of a family that sadly has experience of losing someone to MND and who has already recognised the subtle symptoms in Patrick as MND, which shows just how realistic Jeremy's portrayal is."

It can also be noted that Patrick is the first ever soap character to have Motor Neurone as well as the first soap character to die from it.
The 2015 Hollyoaks Autumn trailer showed Patrick asking Maxine to help him die.

== Storylines ==
Dodger tracks Patrick down and decides to visit him. Dodger and friend Darren Osborne (Ashley Taylor Dawson) visit under the pretence of carrying out a census. When Patrick questions if they are official, he discovers they are not and assumes that Dodger and Darren are trying to con him. Dodger reveals he is Patrick's son, although Patrick initially believes Dodger is lying due to him being told that his son had died a long time ago, but he eventually accepts the truth.

Patrick starts dating Maxine Minniver (Nikki Sanderson) and it later becomes clear that he is abusing her, physically and mentally. When Maxine goes up in court for perverting the course of justice and is given community service, she tells Patrick that she was let off in order to stay on the right side of him, but when Patrick sees Maxine doing community service, he later physically abuses her at home. He continues to do this every time that Maxine does something that he does not approve of. In 2013, Patrick, Maxine, Sienna (Anna Passey), Dodger, Dirk Savage (David Kennedy), Dennis Savage (Joe Tracini) and Martha Kane (Carli Norris) were held hostage by his stepson Will Savage (James Atherton), as part of his revenge plot against Dodger, but he survives the ordeal. Patrick discovers that Anna had truly loved him, despite his abuse, and after Will's arrest, Patrick takes ownership of Anna's belongings since he and Anna were still legally married at the time of her death, making her marriage to Dirk invalid.

Patrick later shocked when he discovers that Sienna had faked her pregnancy and discovers that she attempted to ruin Nancy and her relationship with Darren. He calls the police and brings her to a mental illness clinic, but later released, as she was in a hate campaign for what she has done, but, many people then begun to blame him, including Nancy after discovering her past was. It was revealed that he is the one who was responsible for giving her daughter to someone else, that leads him to tell her that she was dead. Patrick later hits Maxine after he believes that she has been cheating on him, due to her becoming pregnant, which unbeknownst to him, is heard by Dennis. Patrick continues to abuse Maxine and becomes unaware that she is being helped by Dennis, who urges her to leave. Patrick later proposes to Maxine and she accepts. Dennis tells Blessing Chambers (Modupe Adeyeye) and she vows not to tell anybody, but tells Maxine that she knows. As plans for the wedding go ahead, Maxine is helped by Blessing and Dennis to plan to fly to America the day before the wedding to live with her sister Mitzeee (Rachel Shenton), but Patrick discovers this and brings her back. The pair get married, with Patrick vowing never to hurt Maxine again. After the wedding, Maxine tells Patrick she cannot continue with him and he grabs her by the wrist, claiming to the guests that she is ill and he wants to take her home. She exclaims that she wants to go alone and Patrick grabs her, pulling off her dress at the shoulder to reveal bruises caused by his beatings. She then finally tells everybody that it was Patrick; however, he is able to convince several residents that Maxine is lying. During a night out with her friends at The Loft, Maxine is dragged away by Patrick, and after arguing on the balcony, he grabs her, causing Maxine to fall down the fire escape stairs.

Patrick tries to dissuade his daughter, Sienna, from finding her own daughter, Nico Blake (Persephone Swales-Dawson), after Sienna finds out that he had been lying about her being dead. Patrick speaks to Nico's adoptive mother, Denise, and convinces Sienna that another girl is her daughter and is happy where she is. However, when Nico runs away from Denise and finds Sienna, but Patrick threatens her into leaving. Sienna and Dodger then disown Patrick and later manage to find Nico. Patrick still threatens her so she retaliates by poisoning him which he believes Maxine to be doing. Patrick later begrudgingly accepts Nico.

When Sienna runs Patrick over, Patrick lies to the police and reports Maxine for it, eventually leading to her arrest and prosecution. When Maxine is allowed out of prison, she tries escaping with Sienna, but Patrick follows them and forces them off the road and onto some train tracks, which leads to the McQueen's wedding reception train derailing. Maxine gives birth to Minnie, with the help of Patrick, but when Minnie is born, Patrick leaves Maxine for dead. Maxine, however, survives so Patrick sends her back to prison by having her drive by pretending that Minnie is sick. On the court day Dodger tricks Patrick into hitting him, showing Patrick's true colors which he records and shows in court. Patrick then lies about what he did to Maxine trying to make her guilty but Maxine walks free. Patrick is furious when Maxine takes Minnie to America for Christmas and upon Maxine's return holds her hostage and tries to take her and Minnie to France but he is stopped by police.

Patrick is later diagnosed with motor neurone disease, which he hides from Maxine as he believes it means that she will gain full custody of Minnie, he also hides it from Sienna and Nico as he does not want them to see him lose control. Patrick later tells Theresa McQueen (Jorgie Porter) and she agrees to become his carer. They later embark on a relationship with each other. Sienna discovers that Patrick has motor neurone disease after stealing his medical record but Patrick convinces her to say nothing. Patrick then witnesses Darren Osborne (Ashley Taylor Dawson) dispose of the gun that shot Phoebe McQueen (Mandip Gill) and forces him to lie in court saying Maxine is an alcoholic and he puts a bottle of alcohol in a water bottle in Maxine's handbag and he wins full custody of Minnie. When Zack Loveday (Duayne Boachie) steals his car where he had hidden the gun Patrick panics and takes Theresa and Minnie aboard for a few weeks. When they return Patrick is less than impressed with Sienna's new love interest Ben Bradley (Ben Richards) and tricks Sienna into breaking up with him. Sienna once she realises she was tricked cancelled his life assurance as revenge for what he did and for planning to leave Theresa everything and her and Nico nothing. Patrick becomes jealous when Maxine starts her new business Minnie cabs as he now has nothing to leave Minnie for her future, but Theresa suggest conning the school, which he agrees to.

Patrick later reveals to Maxine that he is suffering from the disease when she threatens to call social services on him, she also agrees to help care for him but in return she wants joint custody of Minnie and to sign her over to him on his death. Patrick then tries to destroy Maxine's and Darren's relationship and admits to Theresa he still loves Maxine, so she breaks up with him and tells him she wants half the scam money when it is over. Patrick later learns that Nico has murdered Carly Bradley (Sophie Wise) and decides to lie to the police that he did it, but Maxine later talks him out of it saying it would draw attention to Sienna and Nico as nobody would believe he did it. Patrick then tells Theresa he is giving the money he conned back to the school after hearing Maxine praise him for building a special needs unit. He then gets back together with Maxine.

Patrick struggles with accepting his illness and refuses to use a wheelchair although he is losing the ability to walk. While attempting to walk in his office unaided he falls and Peri Lomax (Ruby O'Donnell) comes to his aid. The two then have a heart to heart about Patrick struggles with his illness and Peri's inability to cope with being a young mother. Patrick encourages Peri to be open about how she feels and Peri encourage Patrick to take control. Patrick then gets into the wheelchair. Later when he is alone with Maxine, he asks her to help him die. At first she refuses, but later agrees. When Patrick believes that Maxine is cheating on him with Darren and planning to reconcile with him, Patrick then changes his will to leave everything to Maxine and records a message saying he thinks she is trying to kill him, planning to frame Maxine for his murder.

In January 2016, Patrick and Maxine renew their wedding vows and later, Patrick prepares to die with Maxine and Sienna by his side. However, Maxine breaks down and says that she loves Patrick and cannot watch him die. Patrick then realises that Maxine does love him and decides not to frame her. Nico discovers that Patrick sent Ben a DVD telling him that Nico killed Carly. She confronts him and realising that all the evidence will point towards Maxine, she picks up a pillow and smothers Patrick. Maxine arrives home and is horrified to find him dead. She screams for help which is heard by Darren. Darren finds the camera that Patrick used to make one final message to frame Maxine. Maxine sends the paramedics away after watching the video and she and Darren hide Patrick's body in the broken village wall. Maxine later hears Patrick's voice, warning her that she will eventually get found out. Patrick's body is found in September 2016. Over the years, the trauma of Patrick's abuse continues to affect Maxine.

== Reception ==
Sheffield said of his character that he was originally just seen as Dodger's dad, although eventually people started referring to him as Patrick Blake. He also said that people were picking up on the subtle hints that Patrick was not going to be a nice character. A reporter writing for the Inside Soap Yearbook 2017 included Patrick's return as a "vision" in their "A to Z" list of 2016, adding that "imaginary dead pals were all the rage in 2016!"

For his portrayal of Patrick, Jeremy Sheffield was nominated for several awards. Sheffield was put on the longlist and the shortlist for the British Soap Awards 2014 for Best Actor, although he lost to David Neilson. In the Inside Soap Awards 2014, Sheffield was placed on the longlist for Best Bad Boy, and Patrick and Maxine's domestic abuse storyline was placed on the longlist for Best Storyline, both were also placed onto the shortlist. Whilst the domestic abuse storyline won, Sheffield lost out his award to Marc Baylis. Sheffield would then go on to win the Villain of the Year Award in the 2015 British Soap Awards. Sheffield was longlisted for the Best Actor and Best Bad Boy Award in the Inside Soap Awards 2015. In 2023, Duncan Lindsay from Metro called the character "evil", "violent" and "Gaslighting", and wrote how he was "one of Hollyoaks' most talked about villains of all time" and that viewers would "recall his horrifying behaviour" towards Maxine. Lindsay also called Nico's murder of Patrick a "shocking twist".
