= Maxine Minniver =

Fictional character from Hollyoaks

- Hollyoaks character
- Portrayed by: Nikki Sanderson
- Duration: 2012–2025
- First appearance: 6 November 2012
- Last appearance: 16 April 2025
- Introduced by: Bryan Kirkwood
In-universe information
- Other names: Maxine Blake; Maxine Donovan; Maxine Kinsella
- Occupation: Legal secretary; Salon receptionist; Barmaid; Café manager; Switchboard operator; Businesswoman; Taxi driver
- Father: Dave Chen-Williams
- Mother: Trish Minniver
- Adoptive father: Mick Minniver
- Stepmother: Flora Williams; Honour Chen-Williams
- Half-brothers: Sam Chen-Williams; Mason Chen-Williams
- Half-sisters: Mitzeee Minniver; Lizzie Chen-Williams (adoptive); Serena Chen-Williams (adoptive)
- Husband: Patrick Blake (2014–2016); Adam Donovan (2017–2018); Damon Kinsella (2019–2020)
- Daughters: Minnie Minniver
- Stepdaughters: Dilly Harcourt
- Uncles: Ethan Williams
- Aunts: Joan Blissett
- Nephews: Phoenix Costello
- First cousins: Heidi Costello; Wendy Blissett
- Other relatives: Bobby Costello; Riley Costello; Seth Costello; Jason Costello

Maxine Minniver (also Blake, Donovan and Kinsella) is a fictional character from the British soap opera Hollyoaks, played by Nikki Sanderson. The character made her first on-screen appearance on 6 November 2012. Maxine's storylines have included: domestic violence at the hands of Patrick Blake (Jeremy Sheffield); giving birth to Patrick's daughter Minnie with Down's syndrome, a relationship with her stepson Dodger Savage, a custody battle against Patrick for Minnie, with him attempting to portray her as an alcoholic; her relationship with Darren Osborne (Ashley Taylor Dawson); coping with Patrick's motor neurone disease; burying Patrick's body in the city wall after he was murdered by his great-niece Nico Blake (Persephone Swales-Dawson) and discovering that he framed her for his murder; getting engaged to Warren Fox (Jamie Lomas); falling pregnant and not knowing whether the father is Warren or her boyfriend Adam Donovan (Jimmy Essex); miscarrying the baby after being trapped in a lift by Nico; a love triangle with Adam and his ex-fiancée, Darcy Wilde (Aisling Jarrett-Gavin); a relationship with Damon Kinsella (Jacob Roberts); and having Munchausen syndrome. On 23 February 2025 it was announced that Sanderson had quit the role of Maxine after 12 years with her final scenes airing on 16 April 2025.

== Casting ==
The character and Sanderson's casting was announced on 28 September 2012. Sanderson joined the serial on a year contract. On her casting, the actress said: "Being a member of the Hollyoaks team has so far been an absolute pleasure, and I am excited about what the future holds for my character. I feel very lucky to be part of such a wonderful show and to be working with an amazing team". Maxine was created as the sister of established character Mitzeee (Rachel Shenton). She has been described as being "a confident, lively and flirtatious bombshell, who lives her life on the edge and can spot an opportunity a mile off". Maxine does not mind taking risks and Digital Spy's Daniel Kilkelly stated that she would cause fireworks in the village. Sanderson described her character as being "a really interesting character to play" as she "has got a heart and she is lovely, but she just doesn't show it at first! When she first arrives, she's more interested in herself and how everyone should fit into her life, rather than her fitting into theirs". Sanderson added that Maxine is "a bit feisty, very confident and knows exactly what she wants, how she wants it and exactly how she's going to get it!"

== Development ==
=== Characterisation and introduction ===
Prepare yourselves for Maxine: She's confident, lively, impulsive and savvy. A fearless risk taker, and she's ready to create a storm in Hollyoaks... It isn't all cuddles and kisses between Maxine and her sister, the glamorous Mitzeee. Fur is gonna fly, and we can't wait...

— E4.com on Maxine.

Digital Spy noted that, "Maxine is billed as a "confident, lively and flirtatious bombshell" who lives her life on the edge and can spot an opportunity a mile off." The Standard stated "Maxine is described as savvy and not afraid to take risks and she is expected to cause fireworks when she arrives in the village."

Sanderson explained the character's backstory, saying she has "just come back from Marbella, where she sold the bar she had with her boyfriend over there, took the money and ran. She's come to Hollyoaks to find her sister, which was quite arrogant of her really because five years earlier she stole Mitzeee's fiance". She added that the relationship is "more than strained" but Maxine "is so ignorant she reckons she can swan back into Mitzeee's life and everything will be totally hunky dory". Sanderson said that Maxine does not feel guilty as she is "quite ignorant and quite selfish" and thinks "Mitzeee should get over it as it was such a long time ago". When speaking to Mitzeee, Maxine realises "the impact it had on her life". Sanderson added that "Maxine stops and thinks about it. She realises that she actually did cause a lot of pain for her younger sister. I don't think she'd realised what she'd caused until now. Maxine was looking after number one, but she sees that she did the wrong thing and maybe she shouldn't have turned up to see Mitzeee after all". Sanderson said that Maxine begins to"realise what a tough time Mitzeee has had" although she "doesn't understand the extent of Mitzeee's feelings" for Riley. She commented that Maxine "does want to put things right with Mitzeee - and with all the other people in Hollyoaks she upsets". Sanderson's initial scenes feature her being slapped by Mitzeee, she revealed that she was slapped for real to make the scenes look realistic. In some of the character's other early scenes she arrives in Hollyoaks village and "decides to pretty much con everybody that she meets on the way through". She added that her character is a "little bit of a conwoman" but will have to "face the music" when she meets those she has conned. Sanderson said this was a "wonderful way of coming into the show".

=== Domestic Abuse ===
The storyline of domestic Abuse between Maxine and Patrick was first announced on 23 October 2013 in Metro. Sanderson said she was "honored" to be a part of the storyline.

During the storyline, Sanderson was showing support to Knowsley Council and Champs’ ‘No to injury time’ campaign. Sanderson said "I am proud to be supporting the ‘No to injury time’ campaign as shockingly, the issue of domestic abuse affects so many people each and every day."

Christian Today reported that the domestic abuse storyline "should challenge us all" it was also written "Hollyoaks couple Maxine Minniver and Patrick Blake are at the centre of what has been described as "one of the UK Soap's darkest storylines"." Speaking to the Mirror, Nikki Sanderson said that the storyline has helped real victims.
In Revelation TV, it was said "With the demographic of Hollyoaks’ viewers being younger than many of the other soaps, it has used the Patrick/Maxine storyline to raise awareness about abuse within teenage relationships, partnering with the Home Office's This Is Abuse Campaign. In the UK, by age 16, 25 per cent of girls will have experienced physical abuse and 72 per cent will have experienced emotional abuse from a partner."

During the storyline where Patrick is trying to get custody of Minnie, the boarding house that Maxine is staying at with Darren Osborne and Tony Hutchison, is vandalized with the words "Once a Victim, Always A Victim".

== Storylines ==
Maxine arrives from Marbella to visit her sister, Mitzeee (Rachel Shenton), after stealing money from her cheating boyfriend and leaving him. However, Mitzeee isn't happy with her arrival after Maxine stole the first man she loved, her fiancé, Gary. Maxine apologises and reminds Mitzeee of the happier times they shared together. Mitzeee tells Maxine that she has to stop lying to her and Maxine says that she has changed and only needs a chance to prove it. Maxine surprises Mitzeee by buying her old place and they decide to call it even. Maxine is drugged by Kevin Foster (Elliot Balchin) because he was told to kill her. Mitzeee tells Maxine about the circumstances around Riley Costello's (Rob Norbury) death, and how devastated she was by this. She later supports Mitzeee and her cousin Heidi Costello's (Kim Tiddy) husband, Carl (Paul Opacic), to get revenge for Riley's death.

After Brendan (Emmett J. Scanlan) and Cheryl Brady (Bronagh Waugh) leave the village, Maxine borrows money from Mitzeee and decides to bid for Chez Chez and run it with her business partner Liam Gilmore (James Farrar) but their attempts are unsuccessful. After an infestation at their home, Maxine asks Patrick (Jeremy Sheffield) and Sienna Blake (Anna Passey) to live with her. After moving in, Patrick discovers that Maxine is unable to read properly and offers to tutor her, much to the delight of Cindy Cunningham (Stephanie Waring) who finds it extremely humorous. Patrick and Maxine break up numerous times mainly over her behaviour. He has been seen controlling her, leading to Ash Kane (Holly Weston) becoming suspicious about him.

Maxine has a one-night stand with Patrick's son, Dodger Savage (Danny Mac), and later learns she is pregnant. Maxine has an abortion because Patrick would know he is not the father as he has had a vasectomy but Patrick finds a pamphlet about abortion aftercare. Dodger also learns that Maxine had an abortion and confronts her. Maxine begins experiencing pain and later collapses. After being discharged from the hospital, Maxine prepares a dinner for Patrick. When she mentions Dodger's name, Patrick punches her. Patrick's abuse continues and Maxine later learns that she is pregnant. She also learns that their child has Down syndrome, and during an argument by The Loft fire escape, Patrick grabs Maxine and she falls down the stairs. Patrick's mistreatment of Maxine escalates over the next few weeks, with several incidents including him forcing her to eat an entire cake, threatening her with a knife, and physically beating her. Maxine enlists the help of Blessing Chambers (Modupe Adeyeye) and Dennis Savage (Joe Tracini) in order to help her escape. She uses a flower in her window to signal to them when Patrick is absent, thus it is safe for them to visit. She leaves an emergency escape bag containing clothes and her belongings in Dennis's shop.

On the night before the wedding, she manages to escape and Blessing drives her to the airport. However, at the airport, security are summoned when Maxine discovers Patrick planted a knife in her escape bag, so she cannot board the plane. She goes through with the wedding and they get married. However, at the reception, she realises she has made a mistake and publicly humiliates Patrick, telling the entire village what Patrick does to her. Some believe her, including Sienna and Nancy Osborne (Jessica Fox), however, most believe Patrick - who has told the village that Maxine beats him. Maxine then says that she will not marry Patrick leading to Patrick grabbing her and pulling her dress off revealing her scars and bruises. Maxine reunites with Dodger and they plan to go to America. While Dodger is in the toilet, Patrick arrives and tries to take Maxine home. Dodger then attacks Patrick, leaving Maxine horrified and she tells Dodger that he is exactly like Patrick. The next day, Dennis gets Maxine to talk to Dodger but he is arrested for assaulting Patrick. Maxine then goes to stay with Mitzeee in America. However, Dodger bumps into Maxine at the hospital and they agree to give their relationship a chance. Maxine plans to propose to Dodger, but the event is ruined by Sienna, and Maxine believes Patrick was responsible. When Patrick is run over by Sienna, Maxine is arrested and charged after Sienna left her engagement ring in the car.

After Maxine is released, Sienna tries to get her to Dodger to tell him how she feels; but Patrick put a tracking device on her phone and chases them, causing Sienna's car to get stuck on the tracks. Maxine rescues Sienna just before the train hits, and then phones for help, while Sienna rescues Dodger. She then goes into labour and gives birth to her daughter, Minnie, in a shack with Patrick delivering the baby. Straight after giving birth, Patrick takes the baby and abandons Maxine. He tells everyone that she died during childbirth but Maxine is found by Theresa (Jorgie Porter) and Celine McQueen (Sarah George) and taken to the hospital. Patrick then tricks Maxine into driving, which is against her bail conditions by pretending that Minnie is dying. The plan works and Maxine goes back to prison. At her trial, Patrick lies to the jury about what happened but Maxine is found not guilty. Nancy then helps Maxine get to America with Minnie. When Maxine returns in the New Year, she is held hostage by Patrick, who plans to take her and Minnie to America against her will, but the police manage to stop him.

Will Savage (James Atherton) kidnaps Maxine and Theresa, trapping them in a boat which he later sets fire to in an attempt to murder them in order to ruin his brother Dodger's life. However, she is rescued by Dodger. Dodger takes the blame for pushing Will off the hospital roof for his daughter, Nico Blake (Persephone Swales-Dawson), he invites Maxine and Minnie to run away with him but she refuses and Dodger leaves alone. Maxine moves in with Darren Osborne (Ashley Taylor Dawson) at the boarding house and he offers her a job as a receptionist at his company Daz Cabs. He supports her through her custody battle with Patrick and they start a relationship. On the day of the hearing, however, Darren being blackmailed by Patrick, lies to the judge that Maxine is an alcoholic. Patrick also puts a bottle filled with alcohol in her bag and she loses custody of Minnie. Devastated Maxine tries to commit suicide by jumping off a church roof, but Darren talks her down and reveals why he did it: Patrick saw him bury the gun that shot Phoebe McQueen (Mandip Gill). Maxine forgives him for it, and says that Patrick already took Minnie away from her, but she's not letting him take Darren too. To prove that she is a suitable mother, Maxine, with Darren's help, starts her own female taxi service named "Minnie Cabs" so she will be able to provide for her future. Patrick then tampers with her relationship with Darren and she breaks up with him, unable to see that Patrick is controlling her again. When Maxine finds out that Patrick has motor neurone disease, she feels sorry for him and spends her days looking after Patrick. One day, Patrick overhears a conversation between Maxine and Darren and thinks they are getting back together as soon as he dies. Without Maxine knowing, he plots a plan to make Maxine look responsible for his murder, such as pretending Maxine hit him and transferring grand sums of money to Maxine's account. Patrick also persuades Maxine to help him die after they renew their vows, so it looks like Maxine murdered him. However, Maxine does not go ahead with it and Nico ends up suffocating him with a pillow.

Maxine comes home, overjoyed with the news that Patrick may not be going through with the suicide, according to Sienna. She enters the bedroom and is shocked to find Patrick's lifeless body lying on the bed. She screams, alerting Darren outside. He enters the house and finds Patrick. Darren finds a camera and then tells Maxine about Patrick's plan. Darren drives to a cliff side and tips Patrick's wheelchair over to make it look like he committed suicide. For a few months, Maxine is haunted by what she had done to Patrick, nearly going into a mental breakdown. Darren and Nancy become fed up with Maxine's worries so they decide to pair her up with Adam Donovan (Jimmy Essex). Darren suspects Adam as he is Grace Black's (Tamara Wall) half-brother. However, Darren and Nancy ruin Maxine and Adam's date. Maxine decides to go to America. When Maxine returns, she reveals that she is engaged to a guy called "Mike Jones", however, it turns out that "Mike" is actually Warren Fox (Jamie Lomas). Maxine introduces Warren to Sienna. Unknown to Maxine, Sienna discovers who Warren really is and the pair team up to make Maxine confess to killing Patrick. Despite Warren's attempts, Maxine does not reveal what she has done with Darren, warning her that she will go to prison. Maxine ends her relationship with Warren but later goes to his house to speak to him. However, Maxine accidentally breaks something that belongs to Warren's sister, Katy Fox (Hannah Tointon), leaving Warren furious. Maxine refuses Warren's apology until Sienna reveals that Katy died. Maxine decides to reconcile with Warren. When Maxine is sleeping, Warren wakes her up and lies that Maxine was continuously screaming Patrick's name. Warren persuades her to tell him if she killed Patrick and Maxine reveals that she buried Patrick's body in the city wall. Warren decides not to tell Sienna after discovering that Patrick was abusing Maxine but Sienna blackmails Warren and he reveals the truth. Maxine goes to Darren and Nancy revealing that she told Mike that she buried Patrick and they reveal that Mike is Warren, who kidnapped Mitzeee. Maxine is devastated as Nancy and Darren reveal that he is using her for revenge. When Maxine returns to Hollyoaks, she discovers police searching the city wall for Patrick's body. Unknown to her, Darren and Nancy have taken his body and planned on burying it in the woods.

Maxine later teams up with Tony, Darren and Grace to get rid of Warren. Maxine, Darren and Tony plan to torch his garage although Warren catches them. Grace accidentally shoots her brother Liam Donovan (Maxim Baldry), and frames Warren for it. Maxine is taunted by Warren who continues to accuse Maxine of Patrick's murder. Warren attempts to call a truce with Maxine who refuses to believe anything he says. Maxine, Nancy and Darren are horrified when Patrick's real killer Nico and her friend Peri Lomax (Ruby O'Donnell) find Patrick's body in the woods. The police later confirm that they found someone's hair in Patrick's body. Maxine later goes to Adam and gives him Minnie's passport begging him to take Minnie to Mitzeee in America, in case she is taken away. Adam is confused and refuses but later decides to do it. Unknown to everyone, Nancy and Darren took hair from a hairbrush in which they thought was Sienna's but it turned out that the hair came from Maxine's brush.

On the start of "The Point of View Week" on 5 September 2016, the first episode mainly focused on Maxine. Maxine is shocked when her hair is found by Patrick's body and during a police interview, Maxine collapses. She is taken to hospital and Tegan Lomax (Jessica Ellis) suggests that she is pregnant. Maxine buys a pregnancy test which is seen by Sienna who tells Warren. Maxine tries the pregnancy test, which reveals positive. Adam starts thinking that the baby could be his after an encounter the pair had a couple of weeks ago although Maxine denies this. Warren barges into the house, revealing that he knows about the pregnancy test. Maxine lies that the baby is Adam's and tells Warren that he is a bad father. Warren redirects the same to Maxine calling her a bad mother, before revealing to Adam that she buried Patrick's body. Maxine reveals to Adam the abuse and torture she received from Patrick. Maxine later decides to hand herself in to the police. She tells DS Gavin Armstrong (Andrew Hayden-Smith) that she gave a false statement before and reveals what she really did with Patrick's body. DS Armstrong refuses to believe her, claiming that she smothered Patrick with a pillow, leaving Maxine to plead her innocence. He assures her that if she reveals who helped her, she has a better chance of not getting a sentence and that she should think about Minnie instead of whoever helped her, before bringing out a brochure and reveals that that was found by Patrick's body. It is later revealed to be Nancy's. Maxine has a miscarriage after being locked in a lift by Peri and Nico. Nico stopped the lift because she thought it was Peri's father Cameron Campbell (Cameron Moore) Nico tells Warren that Cameron locked Maxine in the lift to save herself. For revenge, Warren takes Cameron's girlfriend, Leela Lomax's (Kirsty-Leigh Porter), phone and locks him and Cameron in the same lift and they fight. Maxine starts a relationship with Adam.

In March 2017, Darcy Wilde (Aisling Jarrett-Gavin), Adam's presumed-dead fiancé, arrives and causes havoc in Adam and Maxine's relationship as she still loves Adam. They kiss on the city wall which is witnessed by Maxine. Maxine gives him her engagement ring back and tells him to decide between her and Darcy. Adam starts to spend time with his son Toby Wilde (Lucas Haywood) but when Maxine's daughter Minnie goes for an operation, he decides to support her. They eventually get back together and on their wedding day, Darcy makes Maxine think that she and Adam slept together. Maxine confronts Adam at the altar and storms off. Adam convinces her that nothing happened between him and Darcy and tells Maxine that he loves her. Maxine forgives him and they get married. When they come back from their honeymoon they find Darcy and Adam's brother Jesse kissing and they start a relationship. Adam and Darcy's son Toby accused Maxine of hitting him which he made up. Maxine gets arrested but gets released on bail. Maxine decides that she is leaving to live in Los Angeles with Mitzeee. She nearly leaves but Adam tries to stop her from leaving which he does.

Maxine is later devastated when Adam chooses Darcy over her. She later confronts Darcy and attacks her which is witnessed by Adam. Knowing that Adam will never get back together with her after her fight with Darcy, she decides to go to America after a farewell with Nancy. Maxine returns a few months later and discovers that Toby isn't Adam's son. She tells Adam, finally getting her revenge on Darcy.

Maxine and Adam reconcile a few months later and she is shocked when she finds out he has been working for his corrupt father Glenn Donovan (Bob Cryer). Adam explains that he is working with the police and they decide to leave Chester. Glenn discovers that Adam has been working with the police and kills him, and his body is dumped in front of Maxine leaving her devastated. An angry Maxine confronts Glenn knowing he is responsible but he convinces her that it wasn't him and that he is dying from a brain aneurysm. Maxine is devastated when Glenn shows her footage of Adam sleeping with DS Roxy Cassidy (Lizzie Stavrou), leaving her furious. On the day of Adam's funeral, Maxine trashes the loft so she will be able to see Roxy, and as a result, she misses Adam's funeral. She confronts Roxy at the police station but Roxy says that Adam used her so that he could blackmail her. When Glenn takes her home, they have a moment and she tries to kiss him but Grace walks in so she refrains. Maxine and Glenn grow closer as Maxine is the only one that knows about his aneurysm. Maxine decides to scatter Adam's ashes with Glenn. Maxine gets emotional and can't get over Adam sleeping with Roxy but Glenn comforts her and tries to kiss her but she rejects him. Later at Glenn's office, they kiss and sleep together. The next morning, Grace arrives so Maxine hides under the table but Glenn locks the door leaving Maxine trapped. When Glenn comes back she confronts him which is overheard by Kim Butterfield (Daisy Wood-Davis). Grace walks in Glenn and Maxine about to kiss and furiously throws them out.

Maxine discovers that Glenn has been abusing Grace and tries to make her see sense. They are shocked when Simone Loveday (Jacqueline Boatswain) reveals that Glenn killed Adam. The three women team up to take down Glenn, calling themselves the WAGs (Women Against Glenn). Maxine and Simone break into Glenn's office while Grace distracts him. They find the gun but they set off the alarm and they panic when Glenn arrives. Maxine and Simone escape and they head to the police station, where they tell Roxy about the gun. However, after discovering that her son Zack Loveday's (Duayne Boachie) fingerprints are all over the gun, Simone throws it into the lake. Maxine starts sending notes to Glenn hoping to push him over the edge. At the re-opening of Hollyoaks High, Maxine, Grace, Simone and Courtney Campbell (Amy Conachan) sabotage a banner revealing that Glenn killed Adam. Maxine takes a frustrated Glenn home and tries to record him confessing to Adam's murder. Glenn admits to killing Adam, however, he realises that she is recording their conversation and he tries to kill her with a statue but collapses due to his aneurysm. Maxine contemplates leaving him for dead but Jesse Donovan (Luke Jerdy) walks in so she calls an ambulance. Glenn survives and tells Grace that he wants her to kill Maxine. Grace drives Maxine out of the village and records herself shooting her and shows Glenn the footage. Grace arrives back at her flat where Maxine is revealed to be alive and they decide that Maxine must be kept hidden.

Maxine, Grace, Simone, Courtney and Kim come up with a plan to get rid of Glenn. At his birthday party, they all spike his drink one by one. Glenn collapses and dies and his son Liam (now played by Jude Monk McGowan), becomes suspicious of the WAGs and confronts them, however, everyone is unaware that serial killer, Breda McQueen (Moya Brady), is the culprit behind Glenn's poisoning. Kim takes the blame and leaves the village but Liam threatens Maxine, Grace and Simone telling them that he will find out the truth. Maxine starts to panic and tells the girls that she didn't spike Glenn's drink and that she backed out at the last second. Liam kidnaps Maxine and the girls and ties them up in the loft. He reveals that he will give them each a drink but one contains poison. Simone and Courtney confess that they didn't spike Glenn's drink either meaning Grace was the only one that did. Jesse and Lisa Loveday (Rachel Adedeji) arrive and stop Liam and Grace later reveals that she also didn't spike Glenn's drink. Maxine struggles after her kidnap ordeal so Grace persuades Damon Kinsella (Jacob Roberts) to spend the day with her. A few weeks later, Damon tries to kiss Maxine but she furiously rejects him. However, he makes it up to her by dressing up as Santa for Minnie. Maxine kisses Damon and they start a relationship. Sienna tells Maxine that Damon lied to the police about his dad and Maxine confronts him but he insults her.

On New Year's Eve, Maxine flirts with Zack to try and make Damon jealous and drinks a dodgy bottle of vodka. She collapses outside the garage and is found the next day by Lily McQueen (Lauren McQueen) and Yasmine Maalik (Haeisha Mistry). At the hospital, Maxine is put on a ventilator and doctors tell Damon and Sienna that she is in a critical condition. She later recovers and she and Damon reconcile. After talking to Scott Drinkwell (Ross Adams), Maxine mistakenly thinks Damon wants them to move in together. She is hurt when Damon tells her that he is buying a place with Brody Hudson (Adam Woodward). Damon finds Maxine collapsed on the floor who claims she can't feel her legs. She is taken to a hospital where Misbah Maalik (Harvey Virdi) is unable to find a diagnosis. Maxine moves into her own flat with Minnie but continues to feel unwell. Maxine's test results come back negative but she later collapses. When Maxine feels unwell, Damon asks Grace to watch Maxine for the day and she begins to think that Maxine might be pregnant and tells Damon. Damon surprises Maxine but she tells him that she isn't pregnant but that there is something seriously wrong with her. Maxine faints and is found by James Nightingale (Gregory Finnegan) and his son Romeo Quinn (Owen Warner). At the hospital, Misbah begins to think that Maxine may have a brain disease and only has months to live. It soon becomes clear that Maxine is faking her illness when she confesses to Minnie that she isn't really sick which is recorded on Minnie's toy parrot. When Damon and Liberty Savage (Jessamy Stoddart) are watching Minnie, Damon gets a call from Maxine saying that she has fallen. As he heads off, he presses on Minnie's toy parrot and hears Maxine's confession. He confronts Maxine and thinking she has been caught out, she claims she did it for love. Damon tells her she needs to be honest with Minnie about her illness meaning he misread her confession. However, Maxine's lies are revealed by Scott, causing Damon to break up with her. Damon is then sentenced to six months imprisonment, while the residents turn against Maxine. Maxine's business is closed and she is forced to find another job. Cleo McQueen (Nadine Mulkerrin) helps Maxine apply for a job in Price Slice. Martine Deveraux (Kéllé Bryan) initially refuses to work with her. Despite Martine's reservations, her father Walter Deveraux (Trevor A. Toussaint) is impressed by Maxine's efforts and offers her the job. Aware that Minnie needs a new coat, Maxine worries about how she's going to pay for another one and is later tempted to steal from the shop till, which results in her getting fired. As she grows increasingly desperate for money, Maxine also lies to Liberty that she left her credit card on the bus and asks for a loan, however, Martine and Lisa later uncover her lies. With nobody believing her, and despite asking Misbah for an appointment, Maxine decides to visit Mitzeee in Los Angeles.

A month later, Maxine returns to the village. Many villagers are still angry with her, but Walter forgives Maxine for stealing from him and allows her to return to work at the shop. Maxine later writes a letter to Damon as to why she has been lying and the long-term damage of Patrick's abuse, which Damon struggles to understand. A year later, Maxine discovers that his cousin-in-law Carl was in fact murder by Breda two years ago. Jesse was the first one to forgives Maxine for her lies and allows her to work as a barmaid on his wedding day with Courtney. Maxine later attempts to stop Jesse from drinking, but she fails and Jesse later dies from alcohol poisoning. Upon seeing this, Damon attempts to help Maxine, until he decides to not talk to her for a day after learning that she been kicked out at her home for not paying the rent. He later pays her rent, and Liam decides to help. However, Liam targets Maxine and blames her for Jesse's death, forcing Maxine to sleep with random men to repay her debts. Liam invites Maxine, James, Grace, Warren and Mercedes McQueen (Jennifer Metcalfe) to a "Devil's Dinner Party" at The Dog where he exposes that James and Grace both shot Mercedes. Liam is later murdered by Grace. Grace then forgives Maxine for her lies and Jesse's death, while everybody decides to do the same, leading her to begin her new life away from the past especially Patrick. Maxine later quit her job at Walter shops and works at Donovan's Salon as a secretary. Damon begins to understand Maxine been through towards Patrick, and decide to forgive her and become friends, despite they already divorced and allows him to hang out with Minnie as a father figure anytime he wants.

The following year, Maxine’s mother Trish (now played by Denise Welch) arrives in the village with her new boyfriend Brad King (Tom Benedict Knight), who Maxine was starting to like. Maxine shows some resentment towards Trish for not being in hers and her daughter Minnie’s lives enough, but Trish later apologises for this, and Maxine forgives her.

== Reception ==
Sanderson was nominated for a "Best Serial Drama Performance" at the National Television Awards in 2015, however she lost the award to Danny Dyer, who portrays Mick Carter in EastEnders. The Liverpool Echo talked about the way Sanderson was dressed at the TV Choice Awards. The Manchester Evening News noted Maxine's most notable storyline (Domestic abuse at the hands of Patrick Blake) when reporting about her birthday. Sanderson has been nominated for "Best Actress" and "Best show-stopper" in the Inside Soap Awards of 2015 as Maxine Minniver. The Show-Stopper award is for when the character was contemplating suicide off a church roof. In 2024, Daniel Kilkelly from Digital Spy opined that Maxine's "Long Walk Home" special episode was one of the "occasional highlights" of the soap's "stale and boring" recent years. Maxine's departure was longlisted for "Best Exit" at the 2025 Inside Soap Awards.
