= Dodger Savage =

Fictional character from Hollyoaks

- Hollyoaks character
- Portrayed by: Danny Mac
- Duration: 2011–2015, 2025–present
- First appearance: 4 April 2011
- Introduced by: Paul Marquess (2011); Hannah Cheers (2025)
- Spin-off appearances: Hollyoaks Later (2025)
- Crossover appearances: Brookside (2025)
In-universe information
- Other names: Mark Blake
- Occupation: Bar manager Emporium assistant
- Father: Jeremy Blake
- Mother: Anna Blake
- Adoptive father: Dirk Savage
- Stepmother: Cindy Cunningham (adoptive)
- Sisters: Sienna Blake
- Half-brothers: Will Savage; Hilton Cunningham (adoptive)
- Half-sisters: Liberty Savage
- Daughters: Nico Blake; Myra-Pocahontas Savage-McQueen
- Granddaughters: Tori Devine-Banks
- Grandfathers: Charles Blake
- Grandmothers: Martha Blake
- Uncles: Patrick Blake; Dr. Charles S'avage (adoptive)
- Nephews: Sebastian Blake
- Nieces: Nico Blake; Sophie Blake; Faith Hudson-Savage
- First cousins: Minnie Minniver; Dilly Harcourt; Dennis Savage (adoptive)

Detective Inspector Mark "Dodger" Savage is a fictional character from the British Channel 4 serial drama, Hollyoaks, played by Danny Mac. He made his first on-screen appearance on 7 April 2011 and was introduced as part of the Savage family by creator Paul Marquess. Dodger is played as being a bit "cocky" and as thinking he has "got it all". For his portrayal, Mac has won and been nominated for various awards. In November 2014, Mac opted to leave the role and Dodger made his last appearance on 20 January 2015. Dodger is the biological son of Patrick Blake (Jeremy Sheffield) and Anna Blake (Saskia Wickham), the twin brother of Sienna Blake (Anna Passey), the adoptive son of Anna's husband Dirk Savage (David Kennedy), the half-brother of Will Savage (James Atherton), Liberty Savage (Abi Phillips) and Minnie Minniver and the father of Nico Blake (Persephone Swales-Dawson) and Myra-Pocahontas Savage-McQueen.

His storylines have included a relationship with Texas Longford (Bianca Hendrickse-Spendlove), discovering that Dirk is not his biological father, had a relationship with Theresa McQueen (Jorgie Porter) in which she gave birth to their daughter Myra-Pocahontas Savage-McQueen, discovering Patrick and Sienna are alive, a feud with Will, having a relationship with Patrick's wife Maxine Minniver (Nikki Sanderson), being involved in a train crash, discovering Sienna's daughter Nico Blake (Persephone Swales-Dawson) is also his daughter and fleeing the country after covering for Nico after she pushes Will off the roof of the hospital. Mac later reprised the role and Dodger returned in 2025. In September 2025 it was confirmed that Mac would also be appearing as Dodger in the upcoming Hollyoaks Later one-off special for the 30th during anniversary celebrations due to air in October of that year. Dodger appears in the Hollyoaks 30th anniversary celebrations with the main episode airing on 22 October 2025 seeing Dodger capture his serial killer father Jeremy Blake (Jeremy Sheffield) during an episode that also crossover with Brookside. The events of Hollyoaks Later followed and it kicked off a huge sexual assault storyline for Dodger.

== Casting ==
In March 2011, it was announced that Liberty Savage's (Abi Phillips) family would be introduced to Hollyoaks. Actor Danny Mac was cast in the role of Dodger Savage, the half-brother of Liberty and Will (James Atherton) and the adopted son of Dirk (David Kennedy), following a stint in the West End musical Wicked. Of his casting, Mac commented: "I am over the moon, the last few weeks have been crazy and Dodger's kept me on my toes every second. It's exciting never knowing what he's going to get up to next, and believe me the limits are endless. I can't wait for people to meet him! [...] I am proud to be a Savage and live in anticipation every moment to see what the next move is for the family!" Of the family and their introduction, a Hollyoaks spokesperson added: "The new family will take the village by storm and are set to rub all the McQueens up the wrong way. The Savage family get evicted from their home when Dirk can't keep up with the payments. [...] big brother Dodger has a new house for them to live in! While the McQueens are away on holiday, Dodger moves his family into the empty house and declares squatters' rights!"

== Development ==
=== Characterisation and family ===
Who's that taking his top off in an eye catching and not at all gratuitous way? It can only be cheeky chappy ladies man Mark "Dodger" Savage! Wheeler dealer barman of the SU and occasional stripper/dancer for hire, Dodger is the fella to know if you need a fake driving licence or a cut of questionably sourced lamb. Protective older brother to Will and Liberty, son to Dirk and cousin to Dennis he will make sure they want for nothing. Particularly if he can get it off the back of a van. When he isn't trying to make a fast buck, Dodger is doing what he does best: namely, romancing the fair ladies of Hollyoaks. Never backward when it comes to being forward, he rarely goes home alone at the end of an evening.

— E4 on Dodger.

Mac described Dodger as having the ability to "always find his way out of any mess" adding that Dodger was like "a crap Jack Bauer". He has explained that his character is "a bit cocky and he thinks that he's got it all". Speaking of Dodger's capability to settle down, Mac said he is "human being and as he meets people and forms relationships" so the character is capable of settling down. He added that there is more to Dodger than "just sleeping around and being cocky" which would be further explored in future. On the different sides of Dodger, Mac said they had been developed since he initially appeared citing the fact that people initially thought of the character as two-dimensional as proof. Dodger is described as "cheeky", a "charmer" and the "local womaniser". He has also been described as a "wily and quick-witted character".

Mac hoped that his future storylines would include his character's relationship with his family, adding that he felt the chemistry between his onscreen family is "really good". Mac explained that there is not "much drama" in the Savage family and that they are "loyal to each other and very straight with their morals". Mac went on to add that future storylines would see the family brought together and would allow the audience to "discover more about them as a family". Dennis Savage (Joe Tracini) is later introduced as Dodger's cousin. Tracini explained that the family dynamic is "quite a real one" adding that people can relate to the family. Explaining the character's relationship with Dodger, he said Dodger is "not very happy" to see Dennis when he arrives and he tells Dennis he can not live with the family but despite this Dennis would usually side with Dodger in family disputes. Atherton said that Dennis "idolises" Dodger which leads to Will ignoring Dennis. Atherton said that there is a "brotherly rivalry" between Dodger and Will, explaining that it is due to Will becoming tired of Dodger getting all of their father's affection. He went on to add that the tension between the pair has been building and will soon come to a conclusion. During the conclusion Dodger and Will fight, which Atherton explained is a "proper brotherly scrap" as neither want to hurt the other but they show much anger and frustration during the fight.

=== Relationship with Texas and Jodie ===
Dodger has a casual relationship with Texas Longford (Bianca Hendrickse-Spendlove). Dodger also begins a casual relationship with Jodie Wilde (Montana Manning). Texas and Jodie are also attracted to each other. Mac explained that the relationship between the trio is a "friends with benefits" relationship. He added that the three characters are "so different" yet they share the trait of not wanting to be "tied down". On who his character is more attracted to of the two, Mac said it "literally depends on the day". He has a long history with Texas and is "massively attracted" to her although he likes that Jodie is attracted to both sexes. Mac cited Jodie's dance exams as developing the relationships. Mac revealed that the relationship would continue to develop although he felt that Dodger needed to remain a "lone ranger" for the present. Mac hoped that there would be an eventual climax to the relationships.

=== Biological family ===
In 2012, it was announced that Dodger real family The Blakes will appear in the series. On October 7, it was announced that former Coronation Street star Jeremy Sheffield would be playing Patrick Charles Blake. Of his casting, Sheffield said: "I'm very happy to be joining Hollyoaks at a time when things are getting very exciting". Mac, commented on the character saying that Dodger "needs to find out who his father is and get some questions answered.". At the same time, his sister Sienna Blake will appear in the series. The character was to have been played by Emily Lawrance. However, the role was recast with actress Anna Passey before the character made her on-screen debut. It was revealed that Sienna was Dodger's twin sister, the twin sibling Dodger never knew he had. Both characters made their first on-screen appearance on 21 November 2012.

On 20 May 2014, it was announced that actress Persephone Swales-Dawson had been cast as Nico Blake. Daniel Kilkelly from Digital Spy reported that Nico arrives in Hollyoaks and meets Dodger. He takes pity on her and gives her food. A show spokesperson added "Is this girl just a passing tearaway teenager? Or could there perhaps be something more?". At first, she was taught to be his niece until on 4 September 2014, it was announced that Dodger was Nico's father and had a daughter with his twin sister Sienna. It was discover that Dodger and Sienna had met briefly years ago, and slept together, without knowing they were twins. A spokesperson told Digital Spy today: "Sienna and Dodger were estranged as children and each did not discover they had a twin until adulthood. When Nico was conceived 14 years ago, it was a chance meeting and they did not know that they were related." In an interview with Danny Mac, conducted at the Inside Soap Awards 2014, Daniel Kilkelly noted how some fans loved the twist with Dodger being Nico's father, whereas others hated it. Mac commented that when Dodger finds out he will feel "physically sick", as he never could have "thought this could have been possible." He also said that Dodger would strive to do the right thing, even if he didn't know what that was. In an interview with Digital Spy, Bryan Kirkwood stated that Dodger being the father of Nico had been discussed "right from the start", and that they pushed Dodger being the father due to the audience thinking that it was going to be Patrick, Sienna's father.

=== Departure and return ===
On 21 November 2014 it was announced that Mac had decided to leave the show; his final scenes are due to air in early 2015. It was revealed that Mac had decided to leave the show in October 2013, but producers kept his departure a secret until November 2014.

On 27 October 2024, it was announced that Mac would return to the show and had already began filming his return scenes due to air in January.

== Storylines ==
Dodger and his family are evicted from their home. Dodger decides to take residence in the McQueen family's home while they are selling themselves on the street. Myra McQueen (Nicole Barber-Lane) returns and demands the family leave straight away. Myra changes her mind upon meeting Dirk and allows the family to stay. Dodger takes Myra's pet lamb to be slaughtered, planning to sell the meat for money. Afterwards Dodger is told the meat can't be sold and stages a barbecue. After eating some of the meat Myra discovers its origins and makes the family leave. Dodger begins living in a caravan along with his family.

Dodger and Texas Longford (Bianca Hendrickse-Spendlove) begin casually dating; Texas attempts to make the relationship more exclusive. This leads Dodger to refusing, stating it is easier if the relationship remains open. Dodger assists in setting Will and Theresa McQueen (Jorgie Porter) up on a date. Dodger gives Amy Barnes (Ashley Slanina-Davies) driving lessons in order to help her get a job. An engaged Amy becomes attracted to Dodger and sexual tension leads to the pair sleeping together. Amy's fiancé Lee Hunter (Alex Carter) later discovers Amy's affair with Dodger and attempts to fight with Dodger. Texas and Mandy Richardson (Sarah Jayne Dunn) enlist Dodger in helping to scam money from Cindy Cunningham (Stephanie Waring). Dodger helps Theresa uncover Ethan Scott's (Craig Vye) cheating. Will becomes angry at Dodger when he sells Barney Harper-McBride (Tom Scurr) a tablet computer which doesn't work. Will tells Dodger to stop embarrassing him by selling bad merchandise. Dodger reveals to Will that he has sacrificed the opportunity to carry on with his education so that he could get a job and support his family.

Dodger and Scott Sabeka (Calvin Denba) make a bet to see who can have sex with Texas first. Dodger's cousin Dennis Savage (Joe Tracini) arrives in the village and moves in with Dodger and his family. Dodger convinces Texas to allow Dennis to move in with her. Dodger is introduced to Texas's friend, Jodie Wilde (Montana Manning). Jodie takes a liking to Dodger but is warned by Texas that Dodger is only interested in one night stands which Jodie says she is also interested in, to which Jodie and Dodger sleep together in his caravan. Dodger convinces Dennis to take a job opportunity in Mumbai despite Dennis' worries. When Texas and Jodie begin a relationship Dodger is jealous.

Dodger and his family are made homeless. Dirk calls family friend Walt (Cliff Parisi) who arrives to help the family make money. Dodger and Will begin separate schemes to earn money for the family. Dodger's scheme fails while Will's plans for a gig go well. Will tells Dodger that the gig's headliner does not exist and Dodger plans to help Will until the gig is saved by Dennis. Before leaving Walt makes a comment to Dodger and his family which makes Dodger question his motives. Walt reveals Dodger is not Dirk's son before he leaves. Lynsey Nolan (Karen Hassan) is murdered in a similar fashion to Texas' sister, India Longford (Beth Kingston). Dodger supports Texas and attempts to convince her not to visit India's murderer, Silas Blissett (Jeff Rawle). Despite Dodger's pleas Texas visits Silas who tells her he has an accomplice who killed Lynsey: Will. Will is arrested after the police discover he has photographs of the locations Silas' victims were killed and Lynsey's ring. Will is charged with murder but granted bail until the court hearing. Dodger continues to support Texas, choosing her over Will and his family.

Dodger eventually supports Will and he is let off. Dr Browning is found to be the true culprit. As time draws on Dodger becomes increasingly agitated about finding his real father as Dirk will refuses to admit that he is not his son even though Dodger constantly presses him to admit it. Things come to a head when Dodger loses his temper and trashes his van and runs out on his family. Texas visits Dirk before leaving, Texas finds Dodgers baptismal certificate and takes it with her. Dodger, who got drunk after talking to Walt and trying to find his dad, turns up at Texas' house and she gives him the birth certificate before kicking him out for being ignorant to her. He looks at the piece of paper and realises his real name is Mark Blake. He finally saw his father Patrick Blake and twin sister Sienna Blake for the first time at the boat house, causing Dirk to get angry with Patrick for what he did to his wife. Dodger and his twin sister Sienna, discover Will and Texas having an affair, they have sex together that night. Like Sienna, Dodger was angry at Will and Texas for their affair and sex, causing Will to fall down the stairs and he is left paralysed. Dodger and Sienna did not forgive Texas for what she did.

A stranger, named "Ellie" comes to the village and starts looking after Will. Will soon discovers her to be Anna Blake (Saskia Wickham). Dodger is shocked when his mother Anna had arrived at the village, Dirk tells Anna how Will had suffered and was depressed for the whole time she had left. Anna explains to Dodger why she left, and how their father, Patrick, had beaten her. She told Dodger how she tried to kill him and Sienna when they were young, later on, Dodger forgives her. Patrick has her sectioned for this. Will and Dodger continually visits Anna in hospital, Will tries to get Sienna to visit her too. Ash Kane (Will's girlfriend) arrives on Anna's secure unit and before long the two of them become close, Will tells Anna to stay away from Ash, but she doesn't listen.

Dodger walks in on Will attempting to kill Ash and sees that he can really walk and hears that he killed Texas and Anna but before he has the chance to say anything, an explosion from Ste and Doug's leaving party erupts into the Kane's flat. After gaining consciousness, Dodger confronts Will about what he's just witnessed and tells him that he's dead to him, before attempting to help him up to his feet until the floor collapses taking both Will and Dodger down. As Dodger lies in the rubble pleading with Will to help him, Will tells him that he's dead to him before more rubble falls from above on top of Dodger. Dirk and Patrick worry where Dodger is and why he has not been found. He is later brought out by paramedics and Patrick tells everyone he's alive. In hospital, Will tries to suffocate Dodger but is interrupted by Dirk. When he wakes up he can't remember anything. Dodger goes to the police when Dennis, Martha and himself have pieced together everything and have realized Will is responsible for killing Anna and Texas. Dodger rushes off to Anna's house when he finds out Will's held everyone hostage. In their final showdown on top of the roof, Will tells Dodger to push him but Dodger knows if he does, he will go down for murder, so tells Will to jump. When Will slips Dodger tries to save him but Will pulls him and they both fall to the ground, leaving Will unable to walk and Dodger with a sprained arm. Before arrested, Dodger tells him that he loves him and care for him, but he blames on their mother for ruining Will's life. After his arrested, Dodger now owners Anna's will along with Sienna since their father is legally married to Anna at that time.

Dodger's bad news worsens, as he learns that his twin sister Sienna had faked her pregnancy and kidnapped Darren's son Oscar, Tom Cunningham, and Nancy's nephew Charlie. Sienna fails to kill Darren and is later arrested. Dodger discovers that she had a daughter. Dodger supports her and says he will help her to find her daughter. Dodger protects Sienna after Tom Cunningham and Peri Lomax and other residents campaign against her. Dodger told Tom and Peri about Sienna having a daughter put up for adoption, causing Tom and Peri to forgive Sienna for her actions.

Dodger falls in love with Maxine Minniver (Nikki Sanderson). Dodger's twin sister Sienna develops feelings for him and becomes jealous of his relationship with Maxine. Sienna tricks Maxine into leaving and messages her from Dodger phone saying he doesn't love her, Dodger realises this and plans to leave with her. Sienna then stabs him in the leg to stop him leaving. Patrick tells Sienna that Dodger is Nico's father. This makes her want him more. When Theresa gets out of prison she goes into labour and tells Mercedes to get Dodger. Dodger arrives at the hospital and finds out he's the father of Theresa's little girl. As Dodger is about to leave for LA, Sienna kidnaps him. Dodger soon escapes after Sienna believes that Dodger is correct and she needs help. When they are going home, Sienna becomes paranoid and is about to leave. Dodger tries to stop her however loses control of the car and accidentally hits Sinead O'Connor (Stephanie Davis).

Later on, Will breaks out of prison and kidnaps Theresa and Maxine. He holds them hostage at the Savage barge, luring Dodger there. Will blows the barge up, but Dodger is able to save the girls beforehand. Will then kidnaps Nico, and threatens to throw her off the roof of the hospital. Dodger and Will have a fight, before Nico pushes Will off the roof. Believing Will to be dead, Dodger takes the blame and runs away from town, leaving Maxine and Theresa devastated.

In early 2025 Dodger returns to the village as an undercover police detective, using his handyman skills as a ruse. His mission is to bring down a drug and prostitute trafficking gang who coincidentally are targeting Frankie and Dillon. Eventually he realises that Rex and Grace are involved and are in cahoots with DI Banks and ultimately the gang are brought down.

Sienna and Liberty reconnect with their brother and he is stunned to find out Jeremy is his dad instead of Patrick, and also that he is a grandfather to 7 year old Tori via his incestuous daughter Nico.

In October 2025 Dodger features majorly in the first Later episode for 5 years. Friend and colleague Donnie messages him to help get out a gang ambush. Dodger though is outwitted by the two gang members Sully and Griff. Donnie and Dodger are both tied up. To intimidate the two detectives Sully beats up Donnie, and Griff holding Dodger at gunpoint, marches him into a bedroom where he beats him severely and then rapes him.

== Reception ==
For his role of Dodger Mac won "Sexiest Male" at the 2011 Inside Soap Awards. He was later nominated in the category of "Best Newcomer" at the 2012 National Television Awards. At the 2012 British Soap Awards Mac was nominated for "Sexiest Male". He has since been nominated for "Sexiest Male" at the 2012 Inside Soap Awards. Dodger's rape storyline was nominated in the "Saddest Soap Moment" category at the 2025 Digital Spy Reader Awards. Mac was also nominated in the "Soaps - Best Actor" category.

For his portrayal Mac accumulated an online fanbase, which Mac felt was due to his character's "bad boy status". Colleague Joe Tracini, who plays Dennis, opined that Mac is "bloody brilliant" in his performance as Dodger. In April 2013, Kate White of Inside Soap questioned why Dodger and Will pursued Texas, because White felt Texas lacked personality, "Why on earth are Will and Dodger both so obsessed with Texas? The village fountain has more personality than her - and is only slightly less wet."

During his tenure, Dodger's appearance has been commented on by several media sources. Writing for All About Soap Laura Morgan said Dodger "is the true definition of a sexy soap stud" and said the magazine "love him" already. Nick Levine writing for Digital Spy's gay men's blog "Gay Spy" felt Dodger's entrance into the serial in which he strips off was the way "to make an entrance!" He went on to post images of Dodger's entrance branding it "Danny Mac's torsotastic debut". Sophie Wilson of Heat also commented on Dodger's appearance, saying the character's part in a trailer for the serial is to stroll around and look "F-I-T as always". In his weekly Soap column Anthony D. Langford of AfterElton said he was unsure why Amy had sex with Dodger "other than he's amazingly hot. Which might be reason enough".
