= Jeremy Sheffield =

British actor and ballet dancer (born 1966)

- Born: 17 March 1966 (age 60); Chelmsford, Essex, England
- Occupations: Actor; ballet dancer
- Years active: 1983–present

Jeremy Sheffield (born 17 March 1966) is an English actor and former ballet dancer. He is most noted for his roles in Holby City, Murder in Suburbia and Hollyoaks on television, as well as in the films Creep and The Wedding Date.

== Life and career ==
Sheffield was born in Chelmsford, Essex. The second son of Brenda (née Dare) and Barry Sheffield, he trained as a ballet dancer at the Royal Ballet School, graduating into the Royal Ballet, as well as dancing with Northern Ballet Theatre. Roles with the Royal Ballet included Aria in The Spirit of Fugue, Paris in Romeo and Juliet, Benno in Swan Lake, He in My Brother, My Sisters, Wilfred in Giselle, Rakitin in A Month in the Country and Mouse King in The Nutcracker.

He appeared as a dancer in Queen's music video for "I Want to Break Free" in 1984, performing in a pastiche of the ballet L'après-midi d'un faune. However, his ballet career ended at the age of 27 due to a broken toe and torn ligament.

In 1997, he appeared in the music video of "Torn" by Natalie Imbruglia.

Sheffield's breakthrough came when he starred in the BBC medical drama series Holby City, as heart surgeon Alex Adams from 2000 to 2003. He also played Lancelot in the 1998 television drama Merlin. He had a supporting role in the 2005 film The Wedding Date alongside Debra Messing and Dermot Mulroney. Subsequently, he made a cameo appearance in the final episode of Green Wing.

In 2005, he appeared in the British and Irish Renault Clio advert "France vs. Britain," directed by Ridley Scott's daughter Jordan Scott, who also directed the 2007 follow-up spot, "More Va Va Voom," again starring Sheffield as Ben, and French actress Annelise Hesme as Sophie. He regularly featured on the BBC's Holiday programme, in which he visited Mexico, Egypt, Sichuan, South Africa and Bermuda. In 2006, Sheffield travelled to South Africa, where eight celebrities competed to become rangers in a South African reserve, for the 2007 series of BBC2's Safari School.

In 2007, Sheffield made an appearance in New Tricks.

In January 2010, he took part in ITV's Dancing on Ice alongside professional skater Susie Lipanova. He was the third person to be voted off (therefore finishing the contest in 12th place) after losing in the skate-off.

In October 2011, it was announced that Sheffield would be joining Coronation Street and would portray Danny Stratton. Sheffield's Coronation Street stay was only short, as he was part of a storyline that saw Becky McDonald (Katherine Kelly) depart.

In October 2012, it was announced that he would be joining the cast of Hollyoaks to portray Patrick Blake, the biological father of twins Sienna Blake (Anna Passey) and Dodger Savage (Danny Mac). Sheffield left the cast in 2015, with Patrick's exit scenes airing in January 2016. He resumed the role for an episode in 2024.

He rejoined the cast of Hollyoaks in 2024, portraying Jeremy Blake, the twin brother of Patrick Blake.

== Personal life ==
Sheffield is gay, but rarely gives interviews on the subject, as he feels it is irrelevant to his career, stating:

I don't feel anybody should have to wear their sexuality on their sleeve, but 99% of the time people make a projection onto me that I'm straight, and I feel that if I just allow them to run with that projection, then it's sort of as if I'm lying. It's a strange position to be in, because I shouldn't have to say anything, but I often do feel like I have to get it into the conversation. It's a shame, but that's how it is.

== Filmography ==
=== Film ===
Year	Title	Role	Notes
1995	Safe Haven	Sean	
1997	Anna Karenina	Boris	
2003	The Confidence Trick	Walter	
2004	Creep	Guy	
2005	The Wedding Date	Jeffrey	
2008	Miss Conception	James	
2008	The Children	Robbie	
2008	Last Chance Harvey	Matt	
2010	StreetDance 3D	Michael	
2010	The Long Lonely Walk	JD	Short film
2010	The Power of Three	Film Star	

=== Television ===
Year	Title	Role	Notes
1991	Dark Season	Guard	1 episode
1995	The Governor	Dr. Anthony Thomas	6 episodes
1998	Merlin	Lancelot	Television film
1998	Her Own Rules	Lucas Kent	Television film
2000–2003	Holby City	Alex Adams	Main role
2002	Linda Green	Stan Peterson	Episode: "Blind Date"
2003	The Afternoon Play	Tom Rourke	Episode: "Coming Up for Air"
2003	Grease Monkeys	Mark Miller	Episode: "Last Man Standing"
2003	Hearts of Gold	Dr. Andrew John	Television film
2004–2005	Murder in Suburbia	DCI Sullivan	Main role
2006	Bombshell	Major Nicholas Welling	Main role
2006	Blue Murder	Paul Cochran	Episode: "In Deep"
2006	Green Wing	Jeremy	1 episode
2007	New Tricks	Chris Parr	Episode: "Fathers's Pride"
2008	Hotel Babylon	Adam Price	2 episodes
2009	Personal Affairs	Dr. Richard Palmer	
2011–2012	Coronation Street	Danny Stratton	Recurring role
2012–2016, 2024	Hollyoaks	Patrick Blake	Regular role
2024–2025	Hollyoaks	Jeremy Blake	Regular role

=== Music videos ===
Year	Title	Role	Artist
1984	"I Want to Break Free"	Dancer	Queen
1997	"Torn"	Boyfriend	Natalie Imbruglia
