= Alfie Browne-Sykes =

English actor

- Born: 8 November 1994 (age 31); Dagenham, England, United Kingdom
- Occupation: Actor
- Years active: 2009–present

Alfie Browne-Sykes (born 8 November 1994) is a British actor from Dagenham, England. He is best known for playing Jason Roscoe in the Channel 4 soap opera Hollyoaks from 2013 to 2016.

== Acting career ==
Sykes played guest roles in Doctors, The Bill and Waking the Dead. He also played Freddie in the 2013 movie Beat Girl. He joined the Channel 4 soap opera Hollyoaks on 23 May 2013, playing Jason Roscoe, one of the Roscoe twin-brothers, suffering from anxiety disorder, body dysmorphic disorder and anorexia nervosa. His last episode was 28 March 2016, leaving together with twin brother in the show Robbie Roscoe, played by Charlie Wernham. He also appeared as the school bully in the CBBC drama Runaway in 2009.
