= Ben Richards (actor) =

British actor, dancer (born 1972)

- Born: 27 March 1972 (age 54); West Sussex, England
- Occupations: Actor, dancer
- Partner: Kirsty Duffy
- Children: 1
- Website: www.benrichards.com (defunct)

Ben Richards (born 27 March 1972 in West Sussex, England) is a British stage and television actor and dancer. Richards studied dance from an early age and later took part in theatre. He gained supporting roles in London's West End and gradually filled the role of the lead. After small roles in two films, Richards began his television career with guest roles in various British serials. In 2005, he joined the regular cast of the ITV drama Footballers' Wives and after the series ended he resumed theatre work. Richards went on to secure roles in Holby City and The Bill. While working on the latter, Richards said that he would always pursue his career in theatre, which he did after leaving. In 2015, he joined the cast of the soap opera Hollyoaks as Ben Bradley and remained as a regular for a year. He then returned to stage roles in the West End. Richards has also starred in several pantomimes, including Beauty and the Beast in 2017.

== Career ==
Richards began dancing aged seven and later attended the dance college Laine Theatre Arts. He later began appearing in a number of theatre productions in London's West End. He appeared in supporting roles in the productions of Radio Times, Up on the Roof, Hot Mikado and Smokey Joe's Cafe. In 1993, he was playing Terry Johnson in Grease, with music direction by Mike Dixon. In 1998, he secured his first lead role playing Tony Manero in Saturday Night Fever. He later returned to the West End production of Grease, this time playing the lead character Danny Zuko. Richards made his film debut in the 1997 movie Bring Me the Head of Mavis Davis and in 1999 secured a role in Julie and the Cadillacs. Guest roles followed in the BBC television series' Doctors and Holby City. In 2002 he played Jerry in The Full Monty and, in the following year, played the Dentist in the Little Shop of Horrors.

In 2004, Richards joined the cast of ITV's Footballers' Wives in the role of Bruno Milligan. He also appeared in the ITV2 spin-off Footballers' Wives: Extra Time. In early 2006, it was announced that Richards had joined the cast of Holby City playing a new character, Justin Fuller, remaining in the series for four months. Richards then played Sky Masterson in the UK tour of Guys and Dolls in 2006. That year Richards became a judge on the second series of Strictly Dance Fever.

In 2007, he began playing the role of Nate Roberts in police drama The Bill. He also appeared as Nate for an episode of the German series Leipzig Homicide. The character of Nate became popular and the producers signed Richards to a new one-year contract. However, Richards told Laura Davidson of the Sunday Mail that he still wanted to pursue his career in musical theatre. In 2010, Richards decided to leave The Bill before it was axed by ITV. He then took over Jason Donovan's role of Tick in the West End production of Priscilla, Queen of the Desert.

In 2011, Richards signed up to appear in a production of Peter Pan playing the role of Captain Hook, which premiered at the Grand Canal Theatre. In an interview with RTE, Richards revealed that he had previously auditioned for roles in Coronation Street but was unsuccessful because of his southern accent.

In March 2012, while battling illness, Richards returned to his home town of Bognor Regis to perform his own show titled An Evening with Ben Richards. He told a reporter from the Bognor Regis Observer that the show was a one-off to see how it would be received.

In June 2012, it was announced that Richards would be playing the part of Franklin Hart, Jr. in the first UK tour production of the Broadway musical, 9 to 5. The tour began at the Manchester Opera House on 12 October 2012. Richards continued to tour the show through 2013. In April 2015, it was announced that he had joined the cast of the soap opera Hollyoaks, playing the role of sergeant Ben Bradley. He also had an additional guest role in Doctors playing Mr Kit. He played a lead role in the 2015 film Monsoon Tide, playing Charles Messenger.

In March 2016, it was announced that Richards would be playing Frank Farmer alongside Beverley Knight in the West End revival of The Bodyguard. He later announced that he had filmed his final scenes on Hollyoaks. His character last appeared in the episode broadcast on 28 May 2016. In 2017, he recorded two songs for the album Wit & Whimsy - Songs by Alexander S. Bermange. In October 2021, it was announced by Richards' management that he had been cast in the ITV soap opera Emmerdale as Gavin. In 2021, the director Benjamin Johns revealed that Richards would appear in his television film Relationships.

From 2022 till 2026, Richards has played the role of the Duke of Monroth in Moulin Rouge! at the Piccadilly Theatre.

== Personal life ==
He is a former pupil of Felpham Community College. Richards was married to Helen Richards in 2003. The couple had four children, all of whom were still-born due to a rare condition. Richards is a patron of Expressions Performing Arts in Mansfield, Nottinghamshire.

In January 2012, Richards revealed that he had been diagnosed with bowel cancer. In March 2012, he spoke publicly about his illness in an interview in Hello! magazine. He said that doctors had discovered a six centimetre tumour. Prior to his diagnosis, Richards had been ignoring the symptoms. His doctors also predicted that he would make a full recovery, while his treatment was due to finish later that year. In August 2012, Helen announced on her Twitter account that her relationship with Richards had come to an end.

Richards has been in remission since January 2013 and soon became a patron of the awareness charity, Bowel Cancer UK. He is also a patron for the UK charity Chestnut Tree House. Richards later began a relationship with the television presenter Kirsty Duffy. She gave birth to their first child, daughter Freja Amelie, in 2015.

== Theatre ==
Year	Show	Role	Notes
1992	Radio Times	Unknown	Original London production
1993	Grease	Terry Johnson	Understudy for Kenickie and Johnny Casino
1995	The Hot Mikado	Unknown	
1998	Saturday Night Fever	Tony Manero	
2003	Little Shop of Horrors	Orin Scrivello	
2006	Guys and Dolls	Sky Masterson	UK tour
2010	Priscilla, Queen of the Desert	Tick (Mitzi)	Original London production
2011	Peter Pan	Captain Hook	Premiered at the Grand Canal Theatre
2012	9 to 5	Franklin Hart, Jr.	First UK tour production, beginning at the Manchester Opera House
2016	The Bodyguard	Frank Farmer	West End revival
2022–2026	Moulin Rouge!	The Duke of Monroth	Piccadilly Theatre

== Filmography ==
=== Television ===
Year	Title	Role	Notes
1999	Dad	Tod	Guest role
2001	Holby City	Glen Acfield	Guest role
2001	Doctors	Jimmy Lancaster	Guest role
2005–2006	Footballers' Wives	Bruno Milligan	Regular role
2005–2006	Footballers' Wives: Extra Time	Bruno Milligan	Regular role
2006	Holby City	Justin Fuller	Recurring role
2007–2010	The Bill	Nate Roberts	Regular role
2009	Leipzig Homicide	Nate Roberts	Guest role
2015	Doctors	Mr Kit	Guest role
2015–2016	Hollyoaks	Ben Bradley	Regular role
2017	Alex & Co.	Freddy Wolf	Recurring role
2018–2019	Penny on M.A.R.S.	Freddy Wolf	Recurring role
2021–2022	Emmerdale	Gavin	Recurring role

=== Film ===
Year	Title	Role	Notes
1997	Bring Me the Head of Mavis Davis	Mark	Comedy film
1999	Julie and the Cadillacs	Mike Williams	Musical film
2015	Monsoon Tide	Charles Messenger	Drama film
TBA	Relationships	Jacob	Television film
