= Danny Mac =

English actor (born 1988)

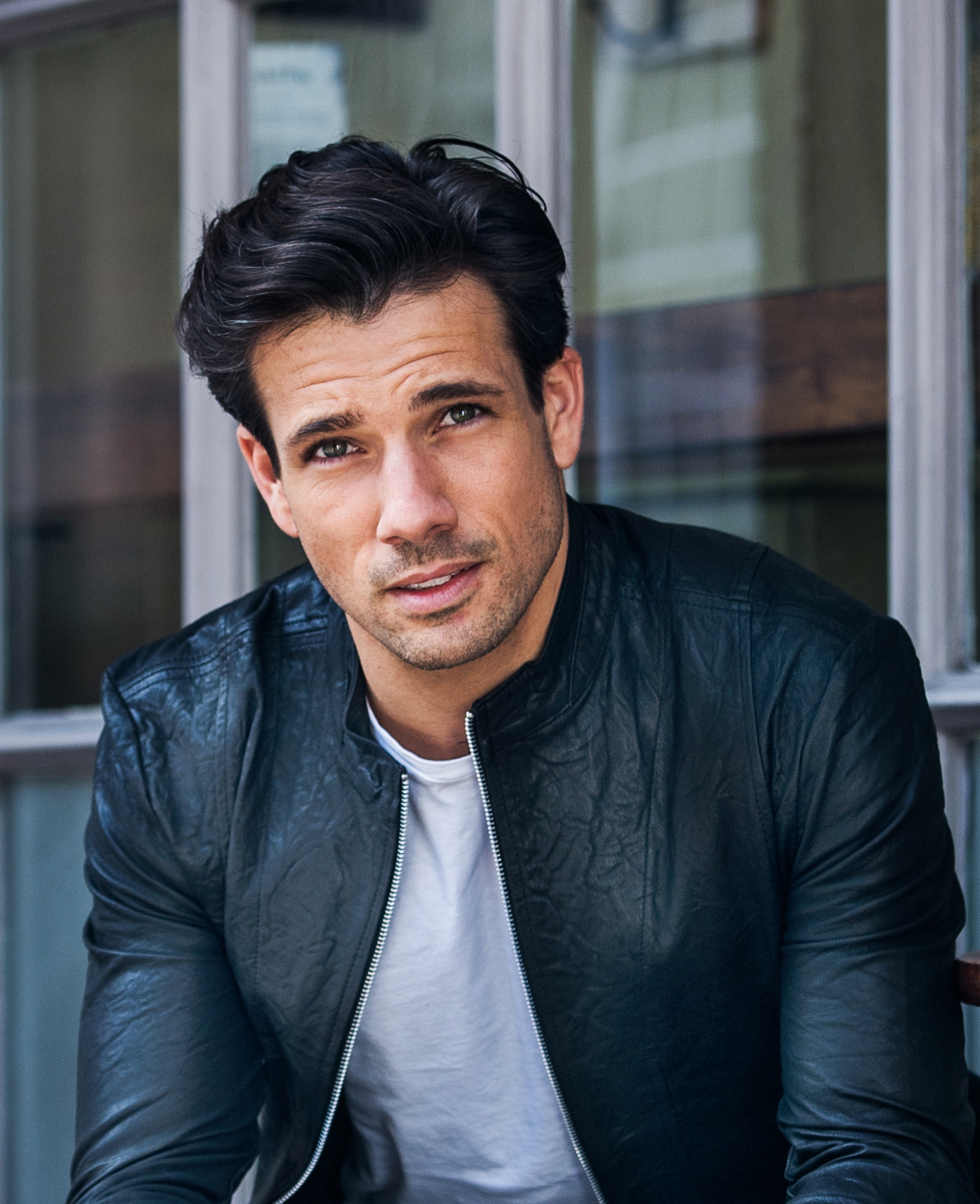
- Mac in 2017
- Born: 26 February 1988 (age 38); London, England
- Occupation: Actor
- Years active: 1998–present
- Spouse: Carley Stenson (m. 2017)
- Children: 2

Danny Mac (born 26 February 1988) is an English actor. He has received a number of awards and nominations including Best Actor, Best Newcomer, Best Actor in a Visiting Production.

== Early and personal life ==
Danny Mac was born in London and spent most of his childhood in the seaside town of Bognor Regis. He studied Acting for two years at Chichester College before attending The Arts Educational Schools in London, graduating in 2009 with a BA Hons degree and received subsequent training at Royal Academy of Dramatic Art (RADA) and personal coaching with Barbara Houseman.

In 2011 he met actress Carley Stenson. The pair began dating and were married in 2017. Stenson gave birth to daughter Skye on 14 June 2021.

== Career ==
Mac began his career at the age of nine when he played Gavroche in the musical Les Miserables for a ten-week run in Southampton in 1998, and appeared in the role again in the West End in 1999. He performed again in the West End a decade later in the musical Wicked from May 2009 to February 2011. He then went on to join the Channel 4 soap opera Hollyoaks in a role that earned him a number of awards and nominations. In 2016, he took part in fourteenth series of BBC One's Strictly Come Dancing. His professional dance partner was Oti Mabuse.

In May 2017, he starred as Gabey in the musical On the Town at the Regent's Park Open Air Theatre in a production that ran until July of that year and was nominated for Best Musical Revival at the 2018 Olivier Awards. From September 2017 to April 2018 he starred as Joe Gillis in the multi award-winning touring production of Andrew Lloyd Webber’s Sunset Boulevard, a role for which he won 'Best Actor' at The Manchester Theatre Awards and was nominated for 'Best Actor' at the WhatsOnStage Awards. The production also won 'Best Regional Production' at the 18th Annual WhatsOnStage Awards and 'Best Musical' at The Manchester Theatre Awards.

In 2018, he appeared as Craig in the Sky One sitcom Trollied. In December 2018 and January 2019, Mac starred as Bob Wallace in White Christmas at Curve in Leicester. The production later transferred to the Dominion Theatre in the West End from November 2019 to January 2020. From May 2019 Mac toured the UK as Nino in the musical Amélie. Mac returned to television, guest-starring in Midsomer Murders in 2019 and Doctors in 2020 and in 2024. In 2020, he played Edward in the London premiere of Pretty Woman: The Musical at the Piccadilly Theatre. Following the closure of theatres due to the COVID-19 pandemic, the production reopened at the Savoy Theatre in July 2021.

In June 2023 he starred in Stephen Sondheim’s musical Assassins as John Wilkes Booth at the Chichester Festival Theatre.

== Filmography ==
Year	Title	Role	Notes
2004	A Line in the Sand	Tom	ITV Drama
2011–2015, 2025–present	Hollyoaks	Mark "Dodger" Savage	Series regular
2011	Children in Need	Himself	Guest
2011	Hollyoaks Best Bits 2011	Himself	
2013	All Star Family Fortunes	Himself	Guest
2015	British Andy	Himself	Guest
2016	Loose Women	Himself	
2016	Strictly Len Goodman	Himself	
2016	Strictly Come Dancing	Contestant (2016)	Runner-up with professional Oti Mabuse
2016	Strictly Come Dancing: It Takes Two	Himself	Weekly appearances
2017	Olivier Awards	Himself	Guest Presenter
2017	A Harvest Wedding	Fleming	Television film
2017	Midlands Today	Himself	
2017	Strictly Come Dancing: It Takes Two	Himself	Panellist
2018	Trollied	Craig	2 episodes
2020; 2024	Doctors	Jonathan Bateson/Hugo Carleton	Episodes: "Merry Frightmas", "A Prescription For Murder Part 1", "A Prescription For Murder Part 2"

== Awards and nominations ==
Year	Award	Category	Result
2011	National Television Awards	Most Popular Newcomer	Nominated
2011	The British Soap Awards	Sexiest Male	Nominated
2011	Inside Soap Awards	Sexiest Male	Won
2011	Inside Soap Awards	Best Newcomer	Won
2011	TV Quick and Choice Awards	Best Soap Newcomer	Won
2012	The British Soap Awards	Sexiest Male	Nominated
2012	National Television Awards	Best Newcomer	Won
2012	Inside Soap Awards	Sexiest Male	Won
2012	Digital Spy Soap Awards	Sexiest Male	Won
2013	The British Soap Awards	Sexiest Male	Won
2013	Inside Soap Awards	Best Actor	Won
2013	Inside Soap Awards	Sexiest Male	Won
2014	The British Soap Awards	Sexiest Male	Won
2014	Inside Soap Awards	Sexiest Male	Won
2015	National Television Awards	Best Serial Drama Performance	Nominated
2018	Manchester Theatre Awards	Best Actor In A Visiting Production	Won
2018	WhatsOnStage Awards	Best Actor In A Musical	Nominated
