= Persephone Swales-Dawson =

British actress (active 2014– )

- Born: Rochdale, England
- Occupation: Actress
- Years active: 2014–present
- Known for: Hollyoaks (2014–2016, 2018, 2020)

Persephone Swales-Dawson is a British actress. She is known for her role as Nico Blake in the Channel 4 soap opera Hollyoaks that she played regularly from 2014 to 2016, reprising the role briefly in 2018 and 2020.

== Early life ==
Swales-Dawson was born in Rochdale and grew up in Yorkshire. She attended Todmorden High School. She began acting in school and joined the youth group at Hebden Bridge Little Theatre (HBLT). In 2013, she successfully auditioned for the Lowry Young Actors Company in Salford. She later enrolled in classes at Mindful Acting.

== Career ==
In 2014, Swales-Dawson joined the cast of the long-running Channel 4 soap opera Hollyoaks as the murderous teen villain Nico Blake, whom she would play until the character's supposed death in 2016. For her performance, she won Best Bad Girl at the Inside Soap Awards that year. In a surprise, she returned to the soap in 2018 to reprise her role as Nico, but the character was killed off the same year. She then reprised the role in 2020 in a series of hallucinations.

Swales-Dawson made her professional stage debut when she played Jade Harcourt on the 2019 UK tour of The House on Cold Hill with Joe McFadden and Rita Simons. She also appeared in the television film Risk Takers.
