= Anna Passey =

English actress (born 1984)

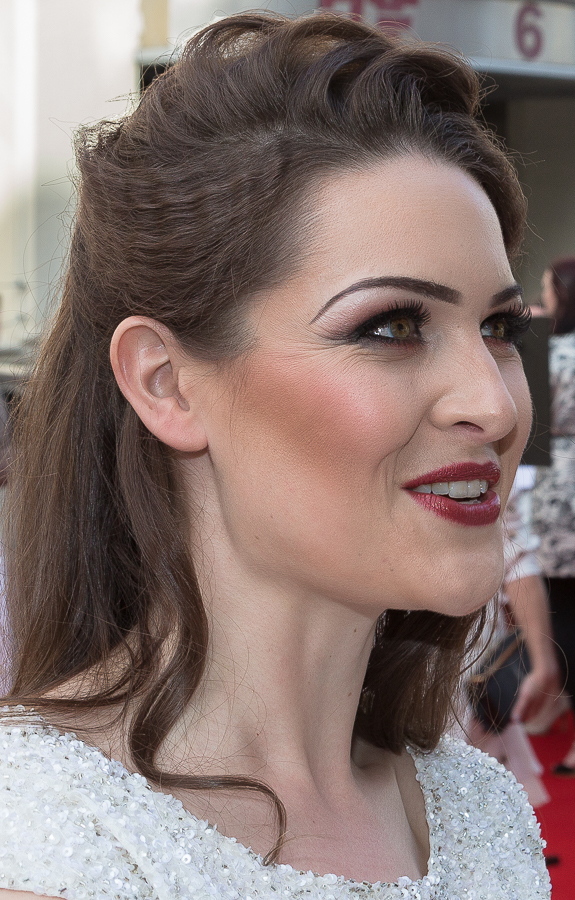
- Passey in 2015
- Born: 28 August 1984 (age 42); Burton upon Trent, Staffordshire, England
- Occupation: Actress
- Years active: 2007–present
- Partner: Kyle Pryor (2019–present)

Anna Passey (born 28 August 1984) is an English actress, known for portraying Sienna Blake in the Channel 4 soap opera Hollyoaks. For her role as Sienna, she won the award for Villain of the Year at the 2014 British Soap Awards.

== Career ==
Passey graduated from the Bridge Drama School in London. Passey first started her career in the BBC documentary film The Last Flight to Kuwait in 2007 opposite Freddie Stroma. Later in 2011, she starred in the British drama film, A Landscape of Lies, as well as the 2012 film Saint Dracula 3D. In 2014, Passey appeared in The Smoke, which was released on 20 October 2014.

On 21 November 2012, Passey started playing the role of Sienna Blake in the Channel 4 soap opera Hollyoaks. Emily Lawrence was initially cast in the role, before Passey replaced her. Tina Campbell of the Metro praised Passey's portrayal and described Sienna as having various layers to her personality. She noted that a backstory consisting of a woman beating father, unhinged mother and long-lost brother left her normality doomed. She added that "despite her (many) flaws, you can’t help but love Sienna" and deemed her Hollyoaks' best character. Katie Archer of BT described Sienna as appearing "sweet and innocent", but "on the inside, things are far uglier." MSN.com labeled the character a "barmaid [turned] psychopath". Viewers' perception of Sienna changed during her tenure. Passey told an Inside Soap reporter that Sienna gained sympathy following revelations about her long-lost daughter. For her role as Sienna, Passey won the Villain of the Year award at the 2014 British Soap Awards. She was nominated for Most Popular Newcomer at the 2014 National Television Awards, later receiving numerous nominations in the Serial Drama Performance category. Then in 2017 and 2018, she was nominated for Best Actress at the British Soap Awards. In 2019, alongside her role in Hollyoaks, Passey appeared in the Netflix series Free Rein, in the recurring role of Felicite.

== Filmography ==
Year	Title	Role	Notes
2009	Keys	The woman	Short film
2011	A Landscape of Lies	Sergeant Egan	Film
2012	Saint Dracula 3D	Celeberant	Film
2012–present	Hollyoaks	Sienna Blake	Series regular
2014	The Smoke	Sasha	Film
2019	Free Rein	Felicite	Recurring role

== Awards and nominations ==
Year	Organisation	Award	Work	Result	Ref.
2013	Inside Soap Awards	Best Bitch	Hollyoaks	Nominated	
2013	Inside Soap Awards	Best Newcomer	Hollyoaks	Nominated	
2014	National Television Awards	Most Popular Newcomer	Hollyoaks	Shortlisted	
2014	British Soap Awards	Villain of the Year	Hollyoaks	Won	
2014	Inside Soap Awards	Best Bitch	Hollyoaks	Nominated	
2015	Inside Soap Awards	Best Bad Girl	Hollyoaks	Nominated	
2015	TV Choice Awards	Best Soap Actress	Hollyoaks	Longlisted	
2016	Digital Spy Soap Awards	Best Actress	Hollyoaks	Nominated	
2017	British Soap Awards	Best Actress	Hollyoaks	Shortlisted	
2017	TV Choice Awards	Best Soap Actress	Hollyoaks	Nominated	
2017	I Talk Telly Awards	Best Soap Performance	Hollyoaks	Won	
2017	RTS North West Awards	Best Performance in a Continuing Drama	Hollyoaks	Nominated	
2018	National Television Awards	Serial Drama Performance	Hollyoaks	Longlisted	
2018	British Soap Awards	Best Actress	Hollyoaks	Shortlisted	
2018	Inside Soap Awards	Best Shock Twist	Hollyoaks	Nominated	
2018	St. Tropez Film Festival	Best Supporting Actress	Landscape of Lies - Directors Cut	Won	
2020	Inside Soap Awards	Feel-Good Moment	Hollyoaks	Nominated	
2020	Radio Times Soap Awards	Best Actress	Hollyoaks	Nominated	
2021	National Television Awards	Serial Drama Performance	Hollyoaks	Longlisted	
2021	Inside Soap Awards	Best Actress	Hollyoaks	Nominated	
2021	The Version Soap Awards	Best Couple	Hollyoaks	Nominated	
2022	National Television Awards	Serial Drama Performance	Hollyoaks	Longlisted	
2022	British Soap Awards	Best On-Screen Partnership (with Kieron Richardson)	Hollyoaks	Nominated	
2022	Inside Soap Awards	Best Double Act (with Kieron Richardson)	Hollyoaks	Won	
2023	British Soap Awards	Best Leading Performer	Hollyoaks	Longlisted	
2025	Inside Soap Awards	Best Family	Hollyoaks	Longlisted	
