= List of Hollyoaks characters introduced in 2014 =

Hollyoaks is a British television soap opera that was first broadcast on 23 October 1995. The following is a list of characters that appeared or will appear in the serial in 2014, by order of first appearance. All characters are introduced by the show's executive producer Bryan Kirkwood. Hilton Cunningham, the son of Cindy Cunningham (Stephanie Waring) and Doctor Browning (Joseph Thompson), was born prematurely on 11 February. Doctor Browning's secret son Alex (Ojan Genc) and Blessing Chambers (Modupe Adeyeye) both made their first appearances in February, while Robbie (Charlie Wernham) and Jason Roscoe's (Alfie Browne-Sykes) estranged father, Rick Spencer (Victor Gardner), arrived in May. June saw the arrivals of Sienna Blake's (Anna Passey) long lost daughter Nico Blake (Persephone Swales-Dawson) and Cameron Campbell (Cameron Moore), Peri Lomax's (Ruby O'Donnell) estranged father and a new love interest for Peri's mother, Leela Lomax (Kirsty-Leigh Porter). Big Bob (Vincent Ebrahim) made his first appearance in August, while Dennis Savage's (Joe Tracini) father, Charles S'avage (Andrew Greenough), Lindsey Butterfield's (Sophie Austin) sister, Kim (Daisy Wood-Davis), and Cameron's brother Lockie Campbell (Nick Rhys) all arrived in October. Myra McQueen's (Nicole Barber-Lane) nieces Celine (Sarah George) and Porsche McQueen (Twinnie-Lee Moore) arrived in November. Cameron's enemy, Shane (Jody Latham), also made a number of appearances in November.

== Alex Browning ==
Alex Browning
- Hollyoaks character
- Portrayed by: Ojan Genc
- First appearance: 13 February 2014
- Last appearance: 3 March 2014
- Introduced by: Bryan Kirkwood
In-universe information
- Occupation: Student
- Father: Dr. Paul Browning
- Mother: Helen Browning
- Stepmother: Mercedes McQueen
- Half-brothers: Hilton Cunningham

Alex Browning, played by Ojan Genc, made his first screen appearance on 13 February 2014. The character and Genc's casting were announced on 12 January 2014 via the Daily Star. Alex is the son of Dr. Paul Browning (Joseph Thompson), a character who last appeared on Hollyoaks in 2013 after being murdered following an altercation with Mercedes McQueen (Jennifer Metcalfe). Alex will arrive in the village hoping to avenge his father's death and becomes suspicious of Mercedes. He has been billed as having "obvious similarities" to Doctor Browning which leaves Mercedes feeling "unsettled".

When Mercedes arrives at Helen's house, after her friend Cindy Cunningham (Stephanie Waring) was impregnated by Doctor Browning and her son, Hilton, needs a bone marrow transplant, his son Alex opens the door. She asks if Helen is at the house, and Alex presumes that she is a cleaner. He reveals that he has a girlfriend, is studying Biology and Physics at university and becomes attracted to her. After they have sex, Mercedes decides to go and he soon uncovers that Mercedes is his stepmother. He confronts her about his father's disappearance, but she walks out of the house. Alex returns and starts to investigate his father's death and becomes suspicious of Mercedes. He torments her throughout his stay and finds out that Mercedes' friend Cindy's son, Hilton, is his half-brother. He becomes a godfather to Hilton and is found out to be a match. Alex agrees to do the transplant to save his brother and leaves later that day. Cindy is grateful and tells him that he can visit Hilton anytime, much to Mercedes' disappointment.

== Hilton Cunningham ==
Hilton Cunningham
- Hollyoaks character
- Portrayed by: Blake Wood (2014–2023); Addison Junior Cornelia (2024)
- Duration: 2014–2024
- First appearance: 11 February 2014
- Last appearance: 4 September 2024
In-universe information
- Family: Cunningham
- Father: Dr. Paul Browning
- Mother: Cindy Cunningham
- Adoptive father: Dirk Savage
- Half-brothers: Alex Browning; Alfie Nightingale; Maddox Keane; Dodger Savage (adoptive); Will Savage (adoptive)
- Half-sisters: Holly Cunningham; Liberty Savage (adoptive)
- Grandfathers: Gordon Cunningham
- Grandmothers: Angela Cunningham
- Uncles: Max Cunningham; Tom Cunningham
- Aunts: Dawn Cunningham; Jude Cunningham
- Nieces: Faith Hudson-Savage (adoptive)
- First cousins: Bethany Cunningham; Steph Cunningham-Lomax

Hilton Cunningham is the son of Cindy Cunningham (Stephanie Waring) and Dr. Paul Browning (Joseph Thompson). He is born three months prematurely and suffers from severe combined immunodeficiency, meaning he needs a bone marrow transplant. Doctor Browning is killed by his wife Mercedes McQueen (Jennifer Metcalfe). Cindy and Lindsey Butterfield (Sophie Austin) helped to dispose of the corpse. Hilton is later christened in the hospital, with Mercedes, Lindsey and Cindy's daughter Holly Cunningham (Amanda Clapham) as his godmothers and Doctor Browning's son Alex Browning (Ojan Genc) as his godfather. Hilton departed the Village with Cindy, Tom and Steph on 4th September 2024.

== Blessing Chambers ==
Blessing Chambers , played by Modupe Adeyeye, made her first screen appearance on 21 February 2014. The character and casting was announced on 5 February 2014. Blessing is a glass collector, working at a strip club which is visited by Dennis Savage (Joe Tracini). Dennis puts Blessing's job and flat in jeopardy when he gets her into trouble with her boss. The character was billed as being "strong and colourful" and not having had a lot of luck in the past. Her surname has been reported as both "Chamber" and "Chambers" on the official site. It is later revealed that Blessing is a transgender woman.

== Rick Spencer ==
Rick Spencer, played by Victor Gardener, made his first screen appearance on 13 May 2014. The character and casting was announced on 17 April 2014. Rick is a bar owner, who employs Holly Cunningham (Amanda Clapham), before later moving to the village where several characters are shocked to see him. Jason Roscoe (Alfie Browne-Sykes) sees him in the bar and collapses. When in hospital, he reveals to girlfriend Holly that Rick is his father. Rick is also the father of Robbie Roscoe (Charlie Wernham).

== Nico Blake ==
Nico Blake, played by Persephone Swales-Dawson, made her first appearance on 6 June 2014. The character and casting was announced on 20 May 2014. Daniel Kilkelly from Digital Spy reported that Nico arrives in Hollyoaks and meets Dodger Savage (Danny Mac). He takes pity on her and gives her food. A show spokesperson added "Is this girl just a passing tearaway teenager? Or could there perhaps be something more?" It was soon announced that Nico is the long-lost daughter of Sienna Blake (Anna Passey). But Patrick Blake (Jeremy Sheffield) intervenes to ruin Nico and Sienna's chances of becoming acquainted. His scams include paying Nico's adoptive mother Denise (Janet Bamford) to trick Sienna into believing someone else is her daughter. When Nico tells Sienna that she is her daughter she is dismissed as a liar. This prompts Nico to begin a revenge campaign. Nico was killed off on 1 November 2016 after a burning maze collapsed with her in it. However, in a twist airing on 15 May 2018, Nico was revealed to have survived the fire.

== Cameron Campbell ==
Cameron Campbell
- Hollyoaks character
- Portrayed by: Cameron Moore
- Duration: 2014–2017
- First appearance: 24 June 2014
- Last appearance: 26 January 2017
- Introduced by: Bryan Kirkwood
In-universe information
- Occupation: Chef (2014–2017); Waiter (2015); Restaurant Co-Owner (2015–2017)
- Father: Tommy Campbell
- Mother: Charmaine Rotherford
- Stepfather: Rotherford
- Brothers: Lockie Campbell
- Wife: Leela Roscoe (2016–2017)
- Daughters: Peri Lomax
- Stepsons: Daniel Lomax
- Granddaughters: Steph Cunningham-Lomax
- Grandmothers: Granny Campbell
- Aunts: Fanny Campbell
- First cousins: Courtney Campbell

Cameron Campbell, played by Cameron Moore, made his first appearance on 20 June 2014. The character and casting was announced on 23 April 2014. Cameron arrived in the village having recently been released from prison, and he has a dangerous past that has had implications for many characters. He was also introduced as a love interest for Leela Lomax (Kirsty-Leigh Porter) and the father of Peri Lomax (Ruby O'Donnell). In January 2017, it was revealed that Cameron would be leaving the show, with Moore's final scenes airing on 26 January 2017.

Cameron is first mentioned by Leela saying she had found his prison and that she was going to talk to him. It is then revealed that he was serving time for a crime he did not commit because Leela's mother Sam Lomax (Lizzie Roper) set him up. Sam then visited him in prison before Leela ordering him not to see her otherwise she'll make sure that he will do more time. Cameron reluctantly agrees but then gets his parole moved up. Later when Sam is getting off work Cameron is seen in the back of her car and forces her to drive away from the village and scares her as revenge for what she did to him. He then reveals that he's sticking around in the village.

He gets a job as co-chef in The Hutch and befriends Leela's half-brother, Ste Hay (Kieron Richardson), much to the horror of Sam and Danny (Stephen Billington). Cameron later confronts Leela about Peri asking if she's his daughter. Leela denies it at first but later tells him the truth. Terrified of Peri finding out the truth, Sam and Danny arrange to take her and their other daughter Tegan Lomax (Jessica Ellis) to New Zealand. Peri becomes depressed at this and drinks a whole bottle of wine, and she is found by Cameron, who she moans to about not wanting to leave. Later angry that Cameron's the reason they're leaving, Ste confronts him, but accidentally tells Cameron they're leaving. Cameron then tells Leela what Peri told him about not wanting to leave, and they confront Sam and Danny, revealing to Peri that they are her parents, much to the shock of Tegan, Ste and Peri. When Peri later goes missing Cameron goes out in the van looking for her, and accidentally smashes into Sam and Danny's car, killing them. He then flees the scene. He is present at the Lomax house the next day when Leela, Tegan, Ste and Ziggy Roscoe (Fabrizio Santino) learn of their deaths and goes with Leela to identify their bodies. Later he supports Peri when she believes her brain tumor has returned; but it's just a false alarm. He then smashes Sam's wreath just before the funeral, and strikes a deal with Freddie Roscoe (Charlie Clapham) to plant evidence in Sam's things; including a false confession saying she killed Fraser Black (Jesse Birdsall). When Peri is furious that Leela and Tegan believe the note, she moves in with Cameron. Cameron and Ziggy later fall out over Leela, Cameron sets him up by having him drive out to the van that killed Sam and Danny, realizing what it is Ziggy tries to burn it but is arrested by police.

During the hospital siege, Cameron sticks with Leela and tries to get into the lift to rescue Tegan and Ziggy but the lift shaft falls, much to their horror. He then protects Leela from Big Bob (Vincent Ebrahim) deflecting the bullet he shot at her back at him, killing him. When his brother Lockie Campbell (Nick Rhys) arrives in the village, he reveals to Cameron that he's engaged, and asks him to be his best man. After the wedding train crashes, Cameron helps rescue Phoebe McQueen (Mandip Gill) from the wreckage and gets the doors open allowing the passengers to escape. Cameron then finds out from Ziggy that Tegan has cancer, so he supports her, encouraging her to tell Leela the truth. Leela then admits she has feelings for him and they begin a relationship much to Peri's delight. When the Lomaxes fall behind with their bills, Cameron breaks into The Dog to get money for them and he narrowly avoids being caught. In January 2015, he reads a text from Peri's mobile phone from her boyfriend Tom Cunningham (Ellis Hollins) and correctly assumes that they had sex. When he confronts them about it at school, they lie but a humiliated Peri stows away with Tegan and Ziggy as they prepare to go on holiday. Ziggy then phones Cameron and Leela and they go to collect her. While there Cameron eats soup laced with magic mushrooms and accidentally reveals to Leela that he killed Sam and Danny. Leela tries to call the police but she changes her mind and forces him to leave the village instead.

Cameron then returns weeks later when Lockie needs to raise money. He then reveals to Lockie that he killed Sam and Danny, and helps him raise the money by robbing their mother's old boyfriend. Upon his return he learns about Peri's pregnancy and Leela lets him stay for her sake. On Leela and Ziggy's wedding day he kidnaps Leela and she reveals she can never love him for what he's done – unaware that the wedding camera has recorded the whole thing. Cameron eventually lets Leela go, but is blackmailed by Tom who has seen the footage. Cameron convinces Tom to keep quiet as it would destroy Peri if she found out. Cameron starts a relationship with Celine McQueen (Sarah George) after he helps her rob a house to raise money. He then supports her when her boss Dr. Charles S'avage (Andrew Greenough) finds out the truth, but uncovers the truth about him being a fraud and strikes a deal with him: forget what Celine did and he will not tell anybody about his secret. Dr. S'avage agrees and Cameron uses the money he raised from the house to finance a new restaurant after Lockie caused him to lose his job. Tom later blackmails Cameron to stop Peri having their child be adopted, but Cameron refuses to do so. Tom then uploads the video of what Cameron did to the student-teacher messaging board, but changes his mind at the last minute. He forgets to however delete the video and it is accidentally sent by Ste and Harry Thompson (Parry Glasspool). Peri goes into labour after hearing the confession and Cameron, Leela and Tom help her deliver her daughter, Steph. Peri then calls the police on Cameron. Leela says she can help him run but Cameron refuses, and apologises to Peri and Celine and tells them he loves them, and asks Tom to look after Peri and Steph before handing himself into the police.

Cameron is found not guilty after Leela gives a positive character portrayal to the jury. Tegan, Peri, Ziggy and Ste are furious and disown Leela as they believe she still has feelings for Cameron after everything he has done. In December 2015, Leela and Peri decide to leave the village after Leela discovers that Ziggy and Tegan have feelings for one another. Cameron is furious as he does not know where they have gone and ends his relationship with Celine when she lies that Peri has contacted her. After Leela collects Peri from the village a few weeks later, she tells Cameron that he will never see his daughter again. This results in Cameron confessing to Lockie that he killed Sam and Danny on purpose and will kill Leela for keeping him away from Peri. After following Ziggy to Peri and Leela's new flat, he breaks in, turns all the gas on and locks all the doors while Leela is asleep and Peri is out. When Ziggy drops a present off for Peri later, he wakes Leela and she realises that there is a gas leak, so Ziggy breaks the door down and the pair escape as the building explodes; however, Ziggy hits his head as he and Leela are blown away by the explosion. He later dies from his injuries, leaving Tegan heartbroken.

In 2016, after Ste moves back in with his family, Cameron resents his presence and gets him addicted to crystal meth, which he finds very difficult to overcome. Disgusted by Ste, Leela and Tegan ask him to leave, so he moves in with Harry and his father Tony Hutchinson (Nick Pickard), much to Cameron's delight. It later transpires that Cameron murdered Lockie after he discovered that Cameron caused the explosion that killed Ziggy, and this secret comes under threat by the arrival of his cousin, Courtney Campbell (Amy Conachan), who is desperate to find out where Lockie is. Cameron continues to lie to those he loves, including telling Courtney that he has already had Lockie cremated. Cameron is furious when he discovers that Peri's best friend, Nico Blake (Persephone Swales-Dawson) has become obsessed with her and held her hostage, and so at the "Halloween Spooktacular" festival, Cameron sets fire to the wooden maze where Nico and her mother, Sienna Blake (Anna Passey) are. The building is engulfed by flames, and Sienna is rescued, despite her pleas for Nico to be saved. Nico is then killed when the entire structure collapses on her, leaving Sienna distraught. Elsewhere, Joe Roscoe (Ayden Callaghan) and Mercedes McQueen (Jennifer Metcalfe) are trapped on a ferris wheel, and after Mercedes is saved, an explosion caused by the fire started by Cameron sees Joe fall from the ferris wheel, and later dying in hospital. Cameron later discovers that Celine has footage of him setting the maze on fire, but after overhearing Celine confessing to Tegan that she attempted to murder her stepfather Pete Buchanan (Kai Owen), Cameron blackmails Celine into keeping quiet.

Cameron begins to panic when Celine threatens to confess to the police the truth about the fire. He confronts Celine before luring her into an abandoned shed where he holds Celine hostage. Later, Cameron visits Celine where she begs him to release her, promising that she will keep quiet about the fire and that she can live with the guilt. Cameron visits Celine's boyfriend, Jesse Donovan (Luke Jerdy), and, believing Jesse to be totally oblivious to the person responsible for causing the fire, returns to Celine with the possible intention of releasing her. However, on the way to the shack, Cameron intercepts a voice message from Jesse to Celine making him realise that Jesse knows more than he was letting on. Cameron confronts Celine and tearfully tells her that he has no other way to keep her silence but to kill her, promising to make it as quick as possible before strangling her to death, and dumping her corpse in the lake. On Cameron's wedding day to Leela, she gives birth prematurely and the baby is placed in an incubator to help him breathe. Leela names the baby Daniel, after her father Danny. Cameron notices a bruise on the baby and verbally attacks the staff, believing them to be abusing Daniel but it transpires to be a Mongolian blue spot, which is common in mixed race babies. Leela then reveals to Cameron that Daniel is not his son. Cameron then gives Leela an ultimatum: him or Daniel. Leela subsequently chooses Daniel, so Cameron leaves.

Weeks later, Cameron returns to the village and convinces Peri to lure Leela to the cabin, so that they can "reunite". He also kidnaps Zack Loveday (Duayne Boachie), believing him to be Daniel's father, unaware that Daniel's biological father is actually Louis Loveday (Karl Collins), Zack's father. Cameron meets Leela at the cabin, and plots to murder her for cheating on him. Meanwhile, Courtney, Tegan and Peri go to the river, where Tegan and Courtney find a dead body, which transpires to be Celine's. Cameron hears them screaming, so he locks them in a nearby shack, while hinting to Leela and Peri that he has murdered them. Cameron then holds Leela and Peri hostage and confesses to his murder. He starts setting fire to the cabin so that the three of them can die together, but they are saved by Ste and Ryan Knight (Duncan James). After overpowering Ste, Cameron chases after Leela and Peri in the woods, where he is hit by a campervan driven by Mac Nightingale (David Easter) and Lisa Loveday (Rachel Adedeji). Lisa attempts to help Cameron, but Mac convinces her to leave him. Cameron is then arrested for committing seven murders, however is rushed to hospital for his injuries sustained by the hit-and-run. Courtney visits Cameron in hospital and allows him to see Peri, but only if he gives Zack's location. After Courtney refuses to let him see Peri, Cameron blackmails Lisa, forcing her convince Peri to visit in him prison. Meanwhile, Mac disposes of the campervan. Peri visits him and he begs her to stay in touch, but she refuses and cuts all ties with Cameron before leaving. In February 2017, Leela, Tegan, Courtney and Zack are informed that Cameron has been sentenced to life imprisonment for his crimes.

== Big Bob ==
Robert "Big Bob" Gupta, played by Vincent Ebrahim, made his first on screen appearance on 8 August 2014. The character and casting was announced on 4 July 2014. Big Bob is set to cause trouble for Trevor Royle (Greg Wood) and Grace Black (Tamara Wall) after Trevor is released from prison. Big Bob wants a favour from Trevor, after he helped protect John Paul McQueen (James Sutton).

After failing a drugs raid in a hospital with Freddie Roscoe (Charlie Clapham), Big Bob holds several characters, including Freddie, Grace, Lindsey Butterfield (Sophie Austin), Leela Lomax (Kirsty-Leigh Porter), Cameron Campbell (Cameron Moore), Esther Bloom (Jazmine Franks), Dr. Charles S'avage (Andrew Greenough) and Kim Butterfield (Daisy Wood-Davis) hostage. He shoots Freddie after he tries to act against him and then refuses to let him have treatment. Big Bob is shot dead on 9 October 2014 at the raid during a scuffle with Cameron, who tries to wrestle the gun from him.

== Kim Butterfield ==
Kim Butterfield, played by Daisy Wood-Davis, made her first on-screen appearance on 7 October 2014. The character and Wood-Davis' casting were announced on 23 September 2014. She was introduced as the younger sister of established character Lindsey Butterfield (Sophie Austin). Kim was billed as a "volatile character" who would create trouble for the show's Roscoe family. The casting announcement also revealed the character would quickly become involved in a hostage storyline.

== Dr. Charles S'avage ==
Dr. Charles S'avage
- Hollyoaks character
- Portrayed by: Andrew Greenough
- Duration: 2014–2015
- First appearance: 7 June 2014
- Last appearance: 20 October 2015
- Introduced by: Bryan Kirkwood
In-universe information
- Occupation: Doctor
- Brothers: Dirk Savage; Wayne Savage
- Wife: Julie Savage (backstory); Mariam Andrews (backstory)
- Sons: Dennis Savage
- Nephews: Will Savage; Dodger Savage (adoptive); Nick Savage
- Nieces: Liberty Savage
- Other relatives: Nico Blake (adoptive); Myra-Pocahontas Savage-McQueen (adoptive)

Dr. Charles S'avage, played by Andrew Greenough, made his first appearance on 7 June 2014 The character and casting was announced on 11 March 2014. Dr. S'avage is Dennis Savage's (Joe Tracini) father, and Dirk Savage's (David Kennedy) brother. Dr. S'avage is estranged from Dennis after leaving him to pursue his medical career and has been billed as pompous, as well as having changed his surname to escape from his roots. Dr. S'avage takes charge of a young team of doctors who include Kim Butterfield (Daisy Wood-Davis), Tegan Lomax (Jessica Ellis), Celine McQueen (Sarah George) and other newcomers. Dr. S'avage's introductory storyline saw him taken hostage by Big Bob (Vincent Ebrahim). Dr. S'avage died during the episode that aired on 20 October 2015 when, after discovering the Gloved Hand Killer's identity, he was killed by them. His exit was not announced prior to the episode's airing, making it a surprise for viewers.

Dr. S'avage is first mentioned by his son Dennis, and informs his cousin Will Savage (James Atherton) of how his father left him with Dirk to pursue his medical career at the time, when he was kidnapped by Will. One year later, Dr. S'avage first appears talking to Kim and it is revealed he has recently been hired to work at Dee Valley Hospital. During the hospital siege he tries to stand up to Big Bob when Freddie Roscoe (Charlie Clapham) is shot, but he was overpowered. He then promises to help Lindsey Butterfield (Sophie Austin) get her job back. It is then revealed that he is the father of Dennis who he left in his brother, Dirk's, care when Dennis was a child so he could work abroad. Dennis and Dr. S'avage have a hard time reconciling, especially when Dr. S'avage disapproves of Dennis' transgender girlfriend Blessing Chambers (Modupe Adeyeye). Dr. S'avage then stops Dennis after he threatens to blow up Trevor Royle's (Greg Wood) flat in revenge for Trevor killing his wife, Leanne Holiday (Jessica Forrest), one year prior.

Dr. S'avage then reveals to Tegan that the reason her daughter Rose Lomax's blood transfusion did not work was because Rose was a different blood type than what Tegan was told at her birth, meaning Rose is not her biological daughter. He then informs Tegan that her cancer treatment has not worked and to Tony Hutchinson (Nick Pickard) that his cancer treatment has made him infertile. After the baby swap dilemma comes to light, the midwife who switched them, Mariam Andrews (Helen Lederer), is revealed to be Dr. S'avage's ex-wife. Mariam then blackmails Dr. S'avage into helping her, threatening to reveal a secret of his if he does not. Dr. S'avage then places Mariam in a mental ward which is witnessed by Sienna Blake (Anna Passey). Sienna then gets close to Mariam to try and uncover his secret, and Dr. S'avage, panicking, promises to get her out. Dr. S'avage is angry at his nephew Will for kidnapping Dennis two years prior, and also supports Dirk when he reveals he is being blackmailed over letting his son Will die, but Dr. S'avage tells him he has nothing to feel guilty about. He also helps him set up traps to catch the blackmailer, who is later revealed to be Robbie Roscoe (Charlie Wernham).

Sienna and Dr. S'avage grow closer over the following weeks, which a newly released Mariam is jealous about so she reveals Dr. S'avage's secret: he never fully qualified as a doctor. This panics Sienna as he is treating her daughter, Nico Blake (Persephone Swales-Dawson), who has a kidney infection. Dr. S'avage, however, assures her that he has never miss-diagnosed a patient and that if the truth comes out she may be deemed fit to stand trial and could end up in prison. When Mariam accuses him of killing patients, he denies it and Sienna helps destroy the evidence of him not qualifying as a doctor. When Mariam is found dead in his office after being murdered by the Gloved Hand Killer, Sienna gives him an alibi. A few weeks later, Dr. S'avage finds Sienna suffering an allergic reaction from a bee sting after Nico abandoned her and encourages Sienna to report Nico to Social Services as she needs help. Sienna agrees but later regrets her decision and has an argument with Dr. S'avage about it, before breaking down in tears. Dr. S'avage comforts her and they share a kiss. Sienna tells him later that she just sees him as a father figure, devastating him. Reenie McQueen (Zöe Lucker) then starts flirting with him to get his money, but Dr. S'avage does not believe Sienna when she tells him. After Sienna pushes Reenie down the city stairs, Dr. S'avage helps her cover it up after she admits she needed him by blackmailing Reenie over her using his credit card. He then treats Sienna's wounds after Reenie attacks her and promises to mend her wicker make of the Titanic, which Reenie also destroyed.

In August 2015, Dr. S'avage discovers that Nico murdered Carly Bradley (Sophie Wise) while protecting Sienna and tries to cover it up, but the police are called by Celine. He panics when Nico is arrested, but she is later released. He also treats Leela Lomax (Kirsty-Leigh Porter) after a car explosion and is seen outside when the Gloved Hand Killer murdered Dylan Jenkins (James Fletcher), ruling him out as a suspect. He then becomes suspicious of Dylan's death and when Cindy Cunningham (Stephanie Waring) finds the Gloved Hand Killer's locker with photos of their victims, she shares what she found with Dr. S'avage. Dr. S'avage then finds a strand of hair in the locker and orders all his staff to take a drug test in an attempt to find out who it is. However, Celine panics as she is using hospital appetite suppressants to get thin and she switches her DNA sample in order to throw the scent off her. Dr. S'avage places a camera in the drugs locker to try and catch the killer, but it fails. Later, when Ashley Davidson (Kierston Wareing) is murdered by the Gloved Hand Killer, Dr. S'avage uses the CCTV camera he placed in Ashley's room and succeedingly catches the killer. But, when advancing into the Hollyoaks Pride Festival, he calls Cindy to tell her who the killer is, unaware that the killer is behind him, armed with a syringe. Dr. S'avage is then injured when he is struck by a falling beam after Trevor shot it down by accident. In the confusion, the killer reaches Dr. S'avage and fatally injects him with a large dose of potassium chloride, which was witnessed by young Charlie Dean (Charlie Behan). Dr. S'avage descends into cardiac arrest and is rushed to hospital, but dies when being resuscitated. Dirk is devastated by this as they always argued with each other. However, Cindy is adamant that the Gloved Hand Killer murdered him. Lindsey is later revealed as the killer soon after Dr. S'avage's death.

== Myra-Pocahontas Savage-McQueen ==
Myra-Pocahontas Savage-McQueen
- Hollyoaks character
- Portrayed by: Uncredited (2014–2016); Neave Mullen (2024–present)
- Duration: 2014–2016, 2024–present
- First appearance: 15 October 2014
- Introduced by: Bryan Kirkwood (2014); Hannah Cheers and Angelo Abela (2024)
In-universe information
- Family: McQueen/Savage
- Father: Dodger Savage
- Mother: Theresa McQueen
- Half-sisters: Nico Blake; Kathleen-Angel McQueen
- Grandfathers: Jeremy Blake; William Alexander; Dirk Savage (adoptive)
- Grandmothers: Anna Blake; Kathleen McQueen
- Uncles: Will Savage
- Aunts: Sienna Blake; Liberty Savage; Mercedes McQueen; Jacqui McQueen
- Nieces: Tori Devine-Banks
- First cousins: Bobby Costello; Sophie Blake; Sebastian Blake
- Other relatives: Myra McQueen; Reenie McQueen; Carmel McQueen; John Paul McQueen; Porsche McQueen; Celine McQueen; Cleo McQueen; Matthew McQueen; Minnie Minniver; Patrick Blake

Myra-Pocahontas Regina Madonna Savage-McQueen is a daughter of Dodger Savage (Danny Mac) and Theresa McQueen (Jorgie Porter) and half-sister of Nico Blake (Persephone Swales-Dawson) and Kathleen-Angel McQueen (Nieve Grandison). She was named after Theresa's aunt, Myra McQueen (Nicole Barber-Lane). Theresa was pregnant by Dodger at the time when she attempted to run till she is arrested for the murder of Kathleen-Angel's father, Calvin Valentine (Ricky Whittle), four years prior. Theresa pretended to be in labour in order to escape after discovering that her cousin and Calvin's wife, Carmel Valentine (Gemma Merna), had been tricked by Calvin's brother Sonny Valentine (Aaron Fontaine) for Theresa nearly getting caught back in January 2014. Theresa escapes with the help of Myra and Mercedes McQueen (Jennifer Metcalfe), and runs away again with Kathleen-Angel. The following month, the police finally uncover Sonny's trick and are forced to drop the charges against Theresa due to corrupted evidence and Theresa gives birth to Myra-Pocahontas. A month later, Dodger decided to raise Myra-Pocahontas alongside Kathleen-Angel, despite discovering Nico was his daughter with his sister Sienna Blake (Anna Passey).

In 2015, Dodger left the village following a last showdown with his half-brother Will Savage (James Atherton), leaving Theresa to raise Kathleen-Angel and Myra-Pocahontas as a single mother. In January 2016, Dodger's father Patrick Blake (Jeremy Sheffield) is murdered by Nico, after he sent a video to Sienna's boyfriend Ben Bradley (Ben Richards) proving that Nico killed Ben's daughter, Carly Bradley (Sophie Wise). In March 2016, Myra-Pocahontas leaves Hollyoaks village with Theresa and Kathleen-Angel to live in Spain.

In 2018, Liberty Savage (Jessamy Stoddart) call Theresa to inform to Myra-Pocahontas about her grandfather Dirk (David Kennedy) was killed, however she could not attend and bring her into his funeral due to flight conflicts. She later inform that Dodger is now living with her and was a good father to their daughter especially a father figure to Kathleen-Angel.

== Lockie Campbell ==
Lockie Campbell
- Hollyoaks character
- Portrayed by: Nick Rhys
- Duration: 2014–2016
- First appearance: 24 October 2014
- Last appearance: 19 January 2016
- Introduced by: Bryan Kirkwood
In-universe information
- Occupation: Waiter
- Father: Tommy Campbell
- Mother: Charmaine Rotherford
- Stepfather: Rotherford
- Brothers: Cameron Campbell
- Wife: Porsche Campbell (2014–2016)
- Grandmothers: Granny Campbell
- Nieces: Peri Lomax
- Other relatives: Steph Cunningham-Lomax

Lachlan "Lockie" Campbell, played by Nick Rhys, made his first on-screen appearance on 24 October 2014. The character and casting was announced on 26 August 2014. Lockie is the brother of Cameron Campbell (Cameron Moore).

On his arrival, Lockie meets Cameron's ex-girlfriend Leela Lomax (Kirsty-Leigh Porter) in a nightclub, whom he takes a shine to, and kisses her. He then sells drugs to Leela's half-brother Ste Hay (Kieron Richardson), telling him to pay him back in kind, which his boyfriend John Paul McQueen (James Sutton) overhears. When Ste does not, Lockie wants the drugs back, but unknown to him Ste has added drain cleaner to the drugs before he returned them. Lockie asks John Paul to go for a drink and offers him the drugs that Ste had mixed with the lethal liquid. After accepting and taking the tainted drugs, Ste finds John Paul at The Loft, but John Paul collapses. When he returns home out of hospital, Ste decides to go to rehab to get his life back on track, and Lockie uses the opportunity to tell him that Ste was responsible for his ordeal. Lockie transpires to be bisexual when John Paul realises Lockie has an attraction to him. However, he is shocked when Lockie is revealed to be engaged to John Paul's cousin, Porsche McQueen (Twinnie-Lee Moore). John Paul walks Porsche down the aisle on the wedding day, but decides to tell her that he thinks Lockie is attracted him. When he does, Porsche is shocked, but Lockie explains and she still decides to go ahead with the wedding. They marry, but disaster strikes during the celebrations, the party train derails after hitting Sienna Blake's (Anna Passey) car stuck on the tracks, killing Porsche's cousin Carmel Valentine (Gemma Merna).

In early 2015, Lockie has sex with Diane Hutchinson (Alex Fletcher) and also cheats on Porsche with John Paul and her cousin Mercedes McQueen (Jennifer Metcalfe). Months later, Lockie learns that Mercedes is pregnant when he finds her baby scan, shortly before Porsche discovers Lockie has been cheating with Mercedes and John Paul after found John Paul in the closet, half-naked. Lockie believes he is father of Mercedes' baby but John Paul informs Lockie that Mercedes was already pregnant with Joe Roscoe's (Ayden Callaghan) child before they started an affair. Porsche then demands a divorce. On Christmas Eve 2015, Lockie is kidnapped by Cameron after he told him that he was going to tell Leela that he intended to kill her and her parents Danny (Stephen Billington) and Sam Lomax (Lizzie Roper). He later discovers from Cameron that Porsche has left the village, later, Cameron sees Lockie about to leave town and speeds after him in his car, Lockie's fate is left unknown. Lockie returned in a flashback in April 2016. Later, in May 2016, Cameron accidentally let it slip to Ste that he killed Lockie, whilst scattering their father's ashes. This is confirmed a flash-back which shows Cameron dumping a body in the lake. Viewers then see ID confirming that the body Cameron dumped, was in fact Lockie's.

== Porsche McQueen ==
Porsche McQueen
- Hollyoaks character
- Portrayed by: Twinnie-Lee Moore
- Duration: 2014–2015
- First appearance: 4 November 2014
- Last appearance: 24 December 2015
- Introduced by: Bryan Kirkwood
In-universe information
- Other names: Porsche Campbell
- Family: McQueen
- Father: Derek Clough
- Mother: Reenie McQueen
- Stepfather: Pete Buchanan
- Half-sisters: Celine McQueen; Cleo McQueen
- Husband: Lockie Campbell (2014–2016)
- Grandmothers: Marlena McQueen
- Aunts: Myra McQueen; Kathleen McQueen
- Nephews: Joseph McQueen
- First cousins: Niall Rafferty; Jacqui McQueen; Mercedes McQueen; Tina Reilly; Carmel McQueen; John Paul McQueen; Michaela McQueen; Carmina McQueen; Theresa McQueen
- Other relatives: Phoebe McQueen (adoptive); Kathleen-Angel McQueen; Matthew McQueen

Porsche McQueen (also Campbell), played by Twinnie-Lee Moore, made her first on screen appearance on 4 November 2014. The basis of the character was announced on 3 May 2014, whilst the character name and casting was announced on 26 August 2014. Porsche has been billed as "racier than her four-wheeled namesake", but is fiercely loyal and has a "good moral compass". Daniel Kilkelly from Digital Spy called her a "Feisty Hollyoaks favourite".

On 1 October 2015, it was announced that after less than a year in the role as Porsche, Moore had chosen to leave the show at the end of her contract. Details and timings of Porsche's exit is being kept under wraps. Porsche's storylines in her time on the show included her failed marriage to Lockie after his numerous affairs and a child abuse storyline which saw her reveal stepfather Pete had abused her age 15. Of her time on the show Moore said: "I have had a fantastic time at Hollyoaks and I have loved playing Porsche. Coming in for a big McQueen wedding and being part of the train crash stunt last year was so exciting and a brilliant entrance for a new character." She continued to state recent months on-screen, "I was then honoured to work with the NSPCC on the child abuse storyline, which has been so important to me personally and professionally. There is more to come for Porsche before my exit. I will miss everyone at Hollyoaks but am also looking forward to future projects."

Her sister, Celine (Sarah George) arrives just in time for her wedding to Lockie Campbell (Nick Rhys), which takes place on a party train organised for the reception. At the wedding, best man John Paul McQueen (James Sutton) reveals that Lockie is attracted to him, but Porsche forgives him and the wedding goes ahead. Shortly after the marriage during the celebrations, the train derails when it hits Sienna Blake's (Anna Passey) car stuck on the tracks, killing her cousin Carmel Valentine (Gemma Merna). When Carmel's body is brought to the McQueens, Porsche steals her ring and allows Mercedes McQueen (Jennifer Metcalfe) to get the blame. Whilst attending Carmel's funeral she is insulted by Mercedes. Feeling guilty about allowing Mercedes to get the blame she tells the truth and guesses that Carmel would have given the ring to her but just as the McQueens head to tell Mercedes how sorry they are unknown to them Mercedes is being murdered by Freddie Roscoe (Charlie Clapham) and he manages to clear her body just in time as the McQueens walk in. Porsche along with the McQueens become suspicious about Mercedes' disappearance and they believe she has gone to Alicante. They are shocked when they hear Mercedes has been murdered. Porsche then agrees to take part in the televised reconstruction of Mercedes' death, playing Mercedes. Porsche and Lockie argue with Nana McQueen (Diane Langton) over what goes on in the house and Nana tells Porsche to look for a job. She and Lockie ask Grace Black (Tamara Wall) and Trevor Royle (Greg Wood) for a job and Grace tells them to do a competition and Porsche wins. Whilst having a sisterly talk with Grace she goes to the freezer to get a drink and is locked in by Trevor's long-lost son Dylan Jenkins (James Fletcher). Trevor and Grace find her unconscious and the ambulance rush her to the hospital. She decides to let Dylan off. Porsche is delighted when her sister Cleo McQueen (Nadine Rose Mulkerrin) arrives from France in January 2015. Porsche is also suspicious when Lockie becomes secret but it she realises that he is selling drugs unaware that Lockie once sold drugs to her cousin John Paul which spiked him. Due to the stress Lockie stays a night with Diane Hutchinson (Alex Fletcher) unaware to Porsche. But Porsche eventually learns the truth when she decorates Sinead's room. Later she confronts Sinead but realises Diane slept with Lockie. After exchanging heated words, Diane is pushed out of a window however she does not die.

On 8 April 2015, it was announced that an upcoming storyline would see Porsche involved in a child sexual abuse storyline. In scenes airing on 13 April 2015, Porsche would reveal to Phoebe McQueen (Mandip Gill), who was previously suffered sexual abuse herself, that her mother Reenie McQueen's (Zöe Lucker) boyfriend, Pete Buchanan (later announced to be played by Torchwood actor, Kai Owen) sexually abused her when she was 15 years old. Viewers will soon realise that Porsche told her mother, Reenie, at the time of the incident, but Pete convinced Reenie that Porsche's accusations were not true and that Porsche had propositioned him. A spokesperson for the soap explained: "The McQueen sisters [Porsche, Celine and Cleo] came to Hollyoaks to escape from an unhappy home life and the memory of Reenie's boyfriend Pete. The sisters had never confided in each other about Pete's inappropriate behaviour, which they had all experienced to varying degrees, so the extent of the danger he posed within the family was never revealed. When Pete comes back into their lives, troubled Reenie desperately wants him to stay and the girls want their mum to be in a happier place – but letting him into their home brings with it devastating consequences." Hollyoaks and child protection charity, the NSPCC have both been announced to offer support online over the course of the storyline and are set to promote a 'No Secrets' campaign, which will target to help youth find necessary help if they were to face a similar situation.

NSPCC lead for tackling sexual abuse, Jon Brown, spoke about the upcoming storyline and sexual abuse in children: "Well-researched storylines in soaps can help raise awareness of difficult and important issues, reaching millions of people and helping those affected reach out for support. Sexual abuse is a crime that rips apart families and I am very pleased with the way that Hollyoaks has thoughtfully approached an enormously emotive and challenging subject. Sexual abuse of children within families is disturbingly the most common form and the impact on victims is devastating, sometimes damaging them long into adulthood if they don't get the right support. Children can stay silent for fear of what speaking out will do to the relationships they have with other members of the family. Abusers may cynically use this fear to keep children silent, leaving them suffering a daily nightmare. Its important children know that help is out there and they can move forward positively." Hollyoaks' executive producer, Bryan Kirkwood spoke about how viewers should be aware that Nana McQueen (Diane Langton) suffered sexual abuse within her family, and how the research that the Hollyoaks team did found that abuse can in fact infiltrate generations. He continued to speak about what he hopes to achieve: "Her daughter Reenie is as much the victim here as her daughters in that her own childhood was filled with such unclear boundaries that she is unable to spot the markers that mean her own girls are at risk. But this is not a hopeless story – far from it. It will endeavour to show that we do have the power to stop abuse and most importantly that it is possible to recover and to go on and have a happy and successful life. The campaign 'no secrets' is a simple message that can be used to encourage adults not to ask children to keep secrets and let children know that they shouldn't have secrets either. It is the secrets kept by generations of this family that have led to what we will see play out on screen this year." It was then revealed that Nana's ex-partner, Derek Clough (Bruce Montague), was her real father as Reenie was raped by him.

Porsche's final scenes were filmed on 12 November 2015, and were broadcast on 24 December 2015. However, Moore said that Porsche could return at some point in the future.

== Celine McQueen ==
Celine McQueen
- Hollyoaks character
- Portrayed by: Sarah George
- Duration: 2014–2016
- First appearance: 10 November 2014
- Last appearance: 5 December 2016
- Introduced by: Bryan Kirkwood
In-universe information
- Occupation: Nurse
- Family: McQueen
- Mother: Reenie McQueen
- Stepfather: Pete Buchanan
- Sisters: Cleo McQueen
- Half-sisters: Porsche McQueen
- Grandmothers: Marlena McQueen
- Aunts: Myra McQueen; Kathleen McQueen
- Nephews: Joseph McQueen
- First cousins: Niall Rafferty; Jacqui McQueen; Mercedes McQueen; Tina Reilly; Carmel McQueen; John Paul McQueen; Michaela McQueen; Carmina McQueen; Theresa McQueen
- Other relatives: Phoebe McQueen (adoptive); Kathleen-Angel McQueen; Matthew McQueen; Goldie McQueen; Hunter McQueen; Prince McQueen

Celine McQueen, played by Sarah George, made her first on screen appearance on 10 November 2014. The basis for the character was announced on 3 May 2014, whilst the character name and casting was announced on 26 August 2014. The character made a previously unannounced departure from the soap opera on 5 December 2016, when she was murdered by her ex-boyfriend, Cameron Campbell (Cameron Moore), becoming the fifth member of McQueen family to die on the show since Tina Reilly and Niall Rafferty in 2008, Carmel McQueen in 2014 and Phoebe McQueen and Gabriel McQueen in 2015. Celine is a nurse and is billed as being in touch with her spiritual side and nobody's fool.

Celine arrived for her sister Porsche McQueen's (Twinnie-Lee Moore) wedding to Cameron's brother Lockie Campbell (Nick Rhys). She was on the train when it crashed, but was not badly injured. She and her cousin Theresa McQueen (Jorgie Porter) found Maxine Minniver (Nikki Sanderson) after the crash.

Following the train crash, Celine helps out and becomes a nurse at Dee Valley Hospital. She helps Jason Roscoe (Alfie Browne-Sykes) when he was admitted to hospital after collapsing, and discovers that he has body image issues. Celine confesses that she has battled body image issues since she was Jason's age, however, her advice falls upon deaf ears as Jason refuses to believe he has a problem. Celine also becomes attracted to Jason's older brother Ziggy Roscoe (Fabrizio Santino) and the pair go on a date, although Ziggy prefers Celine's colleague, Tegan Lomax (Jessica Ellis). Celine gets into trouble at the hospital when she takes the blame for Tegan performing a blood transfusion on her own daughter despite being a student nurse, but Tegan later admits the truth and Celine is cleared. Celine and Ziggy sleep together, and Tegan is heartbroken to discover them. Celine and Tegan eventually make up and Tegan confides in Celine when she discovers that her daughter, Rose, is not her biological daughter. Darren Osborne (Ashley Taylor Dawson) attempts to flirt with Celine, although she rejects his advances.

When treating Cameron Campbell (Cameron Moore) for an infection, Celine becomes attracted to him, and she is delighted when he asks her out on a date. However, Cameron is secretly still in love with Tegan's older sister, Leela (Kirsty-Leigh Porter), who is engaged to Ziggy. Cameron later asks Celine for help when he wants to make Leela jealous, and she reluctantly agrees. When this does not work and Leela does not seem jealous, Cameron and Celine sleep together. However, Cameron reads a text message on Celine's mobile phone which reveals that Ziggy and Tegan have feelings for each other, resulting in Cameron confronting Tegan the following day. Cameron later finishes with Celine completely. Celine is now a senior nurse after blackmailing Dr. Charles S'avage (Andrew Greenough). In April 2016, it is revealed that Celine attempted to kill Pete Buchanan (Kai Owen), who was thought to be a victim of serial killer Lindsey Butterfield (Sophie Austin). Celine is later pressured into marrying her aunt, Myra McQueen's (Nicole Barber-Lane) fiancé, Diego Salvador Martinez Hernandez De La Cruz (Juan Pablo Yepez), in an attempt for Diego's mother, Juanita (Jacey Sallés) to give the family £5 million. However, this ultimately ends Celine's blossoming romance with Jesse Donovan (Luke Jerdy). This stresses Celine immensely, as she feels guilty for lying to everybody she knows. On the day of the wedding, Myra declares her love for Diego in front of Juanita, ruining the scam, and so Celine declares her love for Jesse, and they begin a relationship.

Celine discovers that Cameron started the fire in the wooden maze at the "Halloween Spooktacular", which killed Nico Blake (Persephone Swales-Dawson) and Joe Roscoe (Ayden Callaghan), after viewing the footage on a video camera. Celine confronts Cameron, however he threatens her with the information he has about her attempting to murder Pete. Celine and Cameron both promise not to say anything. This causes Jesse to end their relationship because everyone believes that he started the fire. Celine is riddled with guilt and decides to tell the police what Cameron did. Desperate to keep the truth from being revealed, Cameron holds Celine hostage in the same shack where he had previously held Lockie captive. Cameron confronts a terrified Celine after he finds a voicemail from Jesse on her phone, leading to him believing that Celine has told Jesse that he started the fire. Cameron apologises to Celine for doing what he's about to do, she begs Cameron to let her go but he picks up some rope and tearfully murders Celine by strangling her to keep his involvement in the fire a secret. He then disposes of her corpse and her belongings. When Tegan and Cleo become suspicious, Cameron texts them from Celine's phone saying that she was going backpacking to "find herself" and that she would be abandoning all forms of technology. Celine's sister Cleo McQueen (Nadine Rose Mulkerrin) later sees that Cameron has given Celine's ring to Leela as an engagement ring; but believes Cameron's story that he bought it at the Emporium, and assumes Celine sold the ring to finance her travels.

In 2017, Cameron was arrested for a string of murders, include Celine's.

== Minnie Minniver ==
Minnie Minniver
- Hollyoaks character
- Portrayed by: Eva Rooney and Ava Lorente
- Duration: 2014–2020, 2022–2025
- First appearance: 13 November 2014
- Last appearance: 16 April 2025
- Introduced by: Bryan Kirkwood
In-universe information
- Other names: Minnie Blake
- Father: Patrick Blake
- Mother: Maxine Minniver
- Adoptive father: Adam Donovan (void)
- Stepfather: Damon Kinsella
- Half-sisters: Dilly Harcourt
- Grandfathers: Charles Blake; Dave Chen-Williams; Mick Minniver (adoptive)
- Grandmothers: Martha Blake; Trish Minniver
- Uncles: Jez Blake; Sam Chen-Williams; Mason Chen-Williams
- Aunts: Mitzeee Minniver; Serena Chen-Williams (adoptive); Lizzie Chen-Williams (adoptive)
- First cousins: Sienna Blake; Dodger Savage; Phoenix Costello
- Other relatives: Ethan Williams; Seth Costello; Bobby Costello; Sebastian Blake; Nico Blake; Myra-Pocahontas Savage-McQueen; Sophie Blake

Minnie Minniver (also Blake) is the daughter of Patrick Blake (Jeremy Sheffield) and Maxine Minniver (Nikki Sanderson), who was born with Down syndrome. Minnie was born during the "End of the Line" storyline. Maxine gives birth to Minnie in a shed, and Maxine passes out, Patrick decides to flee with Minnie. However, when they arrive at the hospital, Maxine's friends and the hospital staff take Minnie away from Patrick and return her to her mother. Straight after Minnie is born, her parents fight for custody of her. As revenge Patrick, he blackmails Darren Osborne (Ashley Taylor Dawson) to tell the judge that Maxine is an alcoholic. Patrick also puts a bottle filled with alcohol in her bag and she nearly loses custody of Minnie. However, he gets found out and is forced to share custody of Minnie with Maxine in return for Maxine not telling everyone that Patrick is dying from motor neurone disease. In 2016, after Patrick is murdered by her niece Nico Blake (Persephone Swales-Dawson), Maxine takes full custody over Minnie. In April 2017, Minnie has an operation to have her tonsils removed.

== JJ Roscoe ==
JJ Roscoe
- Hollyoaks character
- Portrayed by: Jax and Danny Beswick
- Duration: 2014–2016
- First appearance: 18 November 2014
- Last appearance: 29 November 2016
- Introduced by: Bryan Kirkwood
In-universe information
- Other names: Joseph Roscoe Jr.
- Father: Joe Roscoe
- Mother: Lindsey Butterfield
- Stepfather: Freddie Roscoe
- Half-brothers: Gabriel McQueen
- Half-sisters: Lexi Roscoe
- Grandmothers: Sandy Roscoe
- Uncles: Darren Osborne; Freddie Roscoe; Ziggy Roscoe; Robbie Roscoe; Jason Roscoe
- Aunts: Kim Butterfield; Kath Butterfield
- First cousins: Oscar Osborne; Lexi Roscoe; JJ Osborne; Frankie Osborne; Morgan Osborne; Charlie Dean (adoptive)

Joseph "JJ" Roscoe Jr. is the son of Joe Roscoe (Ayden Callaghan) and Lindsey Butterfield (Sophie Austin). He was born during the episode broadcast on 18 November 2014. During Lindsey's pregnancy with JJ, she is unaware of who JJ's father is as she had slept with both Joe and his brother, Freddie Roscoe (Charlie Clapham). It is later revealed, following a paternity test without Joe's knowledge, that Joe is JJ's biological father, upsetting Freddie. Lindsey and Freddie begin an affair, which is exposed on New Year's Eve 2014, with Joe and Lindsey's relationship ending as a result. Lindsey then goes on to marry Freddie in May 2015, which upsets Joe as he feels that Freddie is taking over his role as JJ's father. In 2016, Lindsey falls pregnant again, and is convinced that Joe is the father, however a scan reveals that she is actually four months pregnant, meaning that Freddie must be the baby's father. Lindsey is later exposed as the Gloved Hand Killer, and she is forced to leave JJ in Joe's care while she goes on the run. However, she soon joins forces with Silas Blissett (Jeff Rawle) in an attempt to kidnap JJ from Joe so he can be with Lindsey, manipulating Lindsey's sister Kim Butterfield (Daisy Wood-Davis) into helping them do so. Lindsey goes into labour, however, and she gives birth to a baby girl, Lexi, but she takes Lexi and flees to the Roscoe household, where Silas has Mercedes McQueen (Jennifer Metcalfe) hostage. After Mercedes revealed how Lindsey played Joe and Freddie off one another, Silas gives Lexi to Mercedes and murders Lindsey, leaving JJ and Lexi motherless. However, Mercedes and Joe begin a relationship and later become engaged, with Mercedes adopting both JJ and Lexi in the process. Unfortunately, in October 2016, Joe and Mercedes do not marry and Mercedes says an emotional goodbye to JJ and Lexi, before beginning a new life without Joe, JJ and Lexi in it. JJ becomes orphaned in November 2016 when Joe dies after falling from a ferris wheel and is being looked after by Mercedes and Freddie, although Joe and Freddie's mother Sandy Roscoe (Gillian Taylforth) originally wanted him and Lexi to live with her in South Africa.

== D.S. Geoff Thorpe ==
DS Geoff Thorpe
- Hollyoaks character
- Portrayed by: James Bradshaw
- Duration: 2014–2018
- First appearance: 21 November 2014
- Last appearance: 27 March 2018
- Introduced by: Bryan Kirkwood
In-universe information
- Occupation: Detective
- Wife: Doreen Thorpe
- Nephews: Ryan Knight

D.S. Geoff Thorpe, played by James Bradshaw, made his first appearance on 21 November 2014. He is introduced as a police officer who visits the McQueens after Phoebe McQueen (Mandip Gill) grows concerned about Mercedes McQueen's (Jennifer Metcalfe) disappearance. After blood is found at the house, he swiftly launches a murder investigation and later arrests Freddie Roscoe (Charlie Clapham). He releases him after Freddie is given a false alibi by Kim Butterfield (Daisy Wood-Davis). After Grace Black (Tamara Wall) falls off the balcony at The Loft, he questions Freddie over his involvement. He then goes to collect Grace's statement, and she corroborates with Freddie's story. After a car is found with Mercedes' blood in it, he goes to the Roscoes' garage, and causes Joe Roscoe (Ayden Callaghan) to become suspicious over Freddie. DS Thorpe later arrives at the Roscoes' house after Myra McQueen (Nicole Barber-Lane) finds out Freddie is leaving. DS Thorpe follows Freddie to where he is going and finds him with Lindsey Butterfield (Sophie Austin). After Joe files a complaint for harassment, DS Thorpe posts him the picture showing Freddie and Lindsey kissing, however, he reveals this to Freddie before Joe can read the letter.

On New Year's Day 2015, he arrests Joe on suspicion of murder after Rick Spencer (Victor Gardener) is killed. He releases Joe when there is not enough evidence to hold him, but re-arrests him after Nancy Osborne (Jessica Fox) comes forward with a false testimony. DS Thorpe later gets Porsche McQueen (Twinnie-Lee Moore) and Myra to view some CCTV footage to see if Mercedes had been found, he is disheartened when Myra does not identify the lady as her daughter. DS Thorpe tells Porsche that he will not take further action until a murder weapon has been found. After Kim retracts her alibi he goes to arrest Freddie, but is unable to get any conclusive evidence. He later arrests Freddie after he is found standing over the unconscious body of a witness. However, after the witness disappears he has to release Freddie again. He asks the McQueens to identify some jewellery after a body is found, but it is found not be Mercedes' body. He searches Freddie's apartment after Mercedes' diary is found, and finds a bloodied shirt belonging to Freddie. DS Thorpe tracks down Freddie and Lindsey after they flee, but when he arrives at their hotel he finds them gone. He later tries to catch Freddie again after Lindsey says where he is, but he is unsuccessful. He interviews Lindsey and Joe after Lindsey sees Grace video calling Mercedes, but Grave convinces Thorpe otherwise. He and Kim trail Lindsey after Kim suspects that she's meeting up with Freddie, but Lindsey manages to avoid them, when Kim thinks she's found another hint to where Freddie is, DS Thorpe rejects it.

DS Thorpe is present at the Roscoes' house when Kim reveals that Freddie will go back there, but he leaves after Freddie doesn't show up. After Lindsey plants evidence at the McQueen household, DS Thorpe questions Phoebe over the murder and later charges her with it. Sinead O'Connor (Stephanie Davis) later approaches DS Thorpe and tells him that she believes that Grace committed the crime after she is threatened by her. DS Thorpe arrests Grace after he listens to a recorded conversation between her and Sinead which leads him to believe that she committed the crime. When Mercedes is taken back to England, she is interviewed by DS Thorpe over her disappearance. He later takes a statement from Joe after he is assaulted, as well as interviewing Tegan Lomax (Jessica Ellis) after her daughter, Rose, is kidnapped. He releases Tony Hutchinson (Nick Pickard) after he is arrested and arranges a press conference, where Tony reveals that his wife Diane Hutchinson (Alex Fletcher) had borrowed his car which leads to DS Thorpe arresting her. He later arrests Tegan for perverting the course of justice when it is discovered that she was in possession of Rose. DS Thorpe speaks at her court hearing and reveals that she was planning on fleeing the country with Rose and Ziggy Roscoe (Fabrizio Santino).

He arrests Nico Blake (Persephone Swales-Dawson) and Trevor Royle (Greg Wood) in relation to the murder of Carly Bradley (Sophie Wise). He later investigates the Gloved Hand Killer after Cindy Savage (Stephanie Waring) alerts him to it. DS Thorpe also shows up to arrest Trevor, after the body of Freddie is found in his boot, but he notices Freddie's hand moving. DS Thorpe, Ben Bradley (Ben Richards) and Jason Roscoe (Alfie Browne-Sykes) all did an open appeal at the hospital saying that they believe the cardiac arrest deaths are linked and they later are later led to believe that Trevor is responsible. During Freddie's "funeral", DS Thorpe takes a phonecall from Freddie and tells him that nobody suspects anything, making DS Thorpe the only person aware that Freddie, is in fact, still alive. On New Year's Eve, DS Thorpe tracks Freddie down in Brighton and informs him that his brother, Ziggy, has died. Freddie is desperate to return to the village to support his family, however DS Thorpe convinces him to stay away until Trevor is convicted. However, in February 2016, Lindsey – the real Gloved Hand Killer – frames Kim for the murders and attempted murders, so DS Thorpe arrests Kim. When Sienna Blake (Anna Passey) is stabbed, he investigates the crime and is convinced either Trevor or Grace committed it, unaware that it was in fact Sienna's daughter, Nico.

In April 2016, when Simone (Jacqueline Boatswain) and Louis Loveday (Karl Collins) discover that Sonia Albright (Kiza Deen) imposed as their missing daughter Lisa Loveday (Rachel Adedeji), DS Thorpe leads an investigation into Joanne Cardsley (Rachel Leskovac) about the disappearance of Lisa. He then arrests Sonia for imposing as Lisa. DS Thorpe then arrests Margaret Smith (Suzette Llewellyn), Joanne's friend, for kidnapping Lisa. In May 2016, DS Thorpe leads the investigation into finding Lindsey, who becomes fugitive after it is revealed that she is the Gloved Hand Killer. He sends a PCSO to guard the Roscoe household while he and police force search for her. After catching Lindsey and realising that she has been murdered herself by Silas Blissett (Jeff Rawle), closing the Gloved Hand Killer case, DS Thorpe sets his sights onto Ben when Trevor is mysteriously stabbed and killed before his wedding. Sienna, who was having an affair with Trevor but married Ben, informs DS Thorpe it was her daughter Nico who killed Trevor. DS Thorpe refuses to believe that a teenage girl could murder such a well-known gangster. Nico admits to Ben that she killed Trevor but in an attempt to spare her of punishment, Ben lies to DS Thorpe that he killed Trevor and is arrested. Nico continues to scheme through the village, when she blackmails Maxine Minniver (Nikki Sanderson). Nico sends a video of her grandfather Patrick Blake (Jeremy Sheffield) expressing his false concerns that Maxine is trying to kill him to DS Thorpe. DS Thorpe investigates this and attempts to intimidate Maxine into confessing. DS Thorpe then believes that Maxine's ex-boyfriend Darren Osborne (Ashley Taylor Dawson) is involved in the disappearance of Patrick, and has a drink with Darren's father, Jack Osborne (Jimmy McKenna), to intimidate Darren. DS Thorpe later arrests and questions solicitor James Nightingale (Gregory Finnegan) after Ste Hay (Kieron Richardson) states that James kidnapped his boyfriend Harry Thompson (Parry Glasspool). DS Thorpe and DS Gavin Armstrong (Andrew Hayden-Smith) then convince Patrick's daughter, Sienna, to help them get Maxine to confess to killing Patrick. DS Armstrong and DS Thorpe eventually get criminal Warren Fox (Jamie Lomas) to help Sienna and pose as Mike Jones to gain Maxine's trust and find out if she killed Patrick. Warren finds out that Maxine hid Patrick's body in the city wall. When DS Armstrong and DS Thorpe investigate, they find that the body had been moved. However, the body is later found in the woods by Nico and Peri Lomax (Ruby O'Donnell), so DS Thorpe and DS Armstrong open an investigation there.

DS Thorpe's nephew Ryan Knight (Duncan James) moves to Hollyoaks with his fiancée Amy Barnes (Ashley Slanina-Davies) and her children to Ste. After a custody battle between Amy and Ste, Ryan believes that Ste reported Amy to Social Services after a video went viral online which looked like Amy was mistreating her daughter, Leah Barnes (Ela-May Demircan). It is revealed that Ste's boyfriend, Harry, who reported her. After DS Thorpe tells Ryan where the phonecall came from, Ryan savagely attacks Ste until Harry admits that he was responsible. DS Thorpe is later forced to give Ryan an alibi when Ste reports him to the police. In January 2017, DS Thorpe investigates the murder of DI Eva Falco (Kerry Bennett), who Grace shot dead on a train. Grace gets an alibi from her half-brother, Adam Donovan (Jimmy Essex), although Grace's other half-brother and Eva's boyfriend Liam Donovan (Maxim Baldry), does not believe his siblings and works with DS Thorpe to gain Grace's trust and get a confession from her. DS Thorpe later reveals to a distraught Liam that Eva was pregnant with his child when she was murdered, hoping that Liam would become more determined to bring Grace down. Liam tries to encourage Grace to do a deal with Shane Sweeney (Lanre Malaolu) where she will swap some of The Loft's cash notes with fake ones. Grace lies to Liam she will do it, but she throws the money away as she is suspicious about Liam's behaviour. As Liam has told DS Thorpe that the deal is on, DS Thorpe and the police turn up at The Loft, but don't find anything. After more help from Liam, DS Thorpe arrests Grace for the murder of Darcy Wilde (Aisling Jarrett-Gavin), Adam's fiancé who has been presumed dead for several years. Grace continues to state that she did not murder Darcy or Eva, and is forced to go on the run. Eventually Thorpe finds Grace but then has to release her when it turns out Darcy was never dead after all.

In March 2017, DS Thorpe appears as Ryan's best man when he marries Amy. He later supports Ryan when Amy is found dead after being murdered by an unknown assailant. DS Thorpe later appears at his own birthday party held at The Dog in the Pond public house, attended by Ryan and Mercedes. Mercedes threatens to expose the fact that Ryan was having sex with Kyle Kelly (Adam Rickitt) at the time that Amy was murdered to DS Thorpe, but she changes her mind upon seeing Amy's children. He later investigates a robbery at the Lovedays, where Simone's jewellery has been stolen. He searches the McQueens, and arrests Prince McQueen (Malique Thompson-Dwyer) on suspicion of committing the robbery. However, in order to protect Prince, his mother Goldie McQueen (Chelsee Healey) confesses to robbing the Lovedays.

In March 2018, DS Thorpe discovers that Ryan was in fact the culprit who murdered Amy. However, Ryan later murders DS Thorpe by strangling him.

== Shane ==
Shane
- Hollyoaks character
- Portrayed by: Jody Latham
- First appearance: 27 November 2014
- Last appearance: 1 December 2014
- Introduced by: Bryan Kirkwood
In-universe information
- Occupation: Gangster

Shane, played by Jody Latham made his first on screen appearance on 24 November 2014. The character and casting was announced on 31 October 2014. Shane arrives after Cameron Campbell (Cameron Moore) receives money from his brother Lockie (Nick Rhys) from Shane. Shane turns up outside the Lomax house eager to buy their house from Leela Lomax (Kirsty-Leigh Porter) and acts strangely around her and Tegan Lomax (Jessica Ellis). He then meets Cameron at Tony Hutchinson (Nick Pickard) and Diane O'Connor's (Alex Fletcher) wedding telling him he wants his money back as he knows information about the armed robbery he helped him with when he was younger. He then meets Cameron's teenage daughter Peri Lomax (Ruby O'Donnell) at her school so she can give Cameron a letter sent from him. Peri tells Cameron and he threatens Shane who tells him that something bad will happen if he doesn't get him his money. Cameron, who wants to keep the money so he can afford to keep the house, only gives him £1,000 out the money which angers Shane who threatens Cameron but Cameron pushes him and warns him how dangerous he is as he secretly killed Sam (Lizzie Roper) and Danny Lomax (Stephen Billington). Shane then takes the £1,000 and leaves for good leaving Cameron's to get on with his life with his family.

== Other characters ==
Character	Date(s)	Actor	Circumstances
Doctor Harker	10 January	Miranda Pleasance	Doctor Harker is a doctor who examines John Paul McQueen (James Sutton) after he is raped.
Desk Sergeant	10 January	Stephen Chapman	A desk sergeant who John Paul McQueen (James Sutton) goes to, to report his rape.
Kelly	10 January	Sarah Churm	Kelly is a worker at the sexual assault referral centre. She admits and helps examine John Paul McQueen (James Sutton) after he is raped.
District Judge	13 January	Will Tacey	A district judge who sends Trevor Royle (Greg Wood) to the Crown court for further prosecuting.
Registrar	15 January	Laurietta Essien	A registrar who marries Freddie Roscoe (Charlie Clapham) and Sinead O'Connor (Stephanie Davis).
Betting Shop Man	20 January	Ted Holden	A betting shop man who is hired by Nancy Osborne (Jessica Fox) to trick Jack Osborne (Jimmy McKenna) into believing that his son, Darren (Ashley Taylor Dawson), is gambling again.
Doctor	20 January	Rebecca Wingate	A doctor who contacts Patrick Blake (Jeremy Sheffield) when she suspects that his daughter Sienna (Anna Passey) is planning an overdose.
Examiner	21 January	Susan McArdle	An examiner for Ziggy Roscoe's (Fabrizio Santino) driving exam. Despite being called a "cow" by his girlfriend, Ruby Button (Anna Shaffer), she passes him.
Police Officer	22 January	Patrick Lally	A police officer who arrives when Nancy Osborne (Jessica Fox) falsely reports that Darren Osborne (Ashley Taylor Dawson) has assaulted her. When he arrives, she tells him that she has brain damage and had been confused when she made the report.
Judge	30 January	Jill Myers	A judge who places Trevor Royle (Greg Wood) on a suspended sentence.
Beverly	5 February – 13 March	Rebecca Charles	Beverly is a social worker who visits Sinead O'Connor (Stephanie Davis) after Lindsey Butterfield (Sophie Austin) feels she is too unstable to look after Katy O'Connor.
H.O.P.O	10–11 February	Annabel Mullion	The Home Office Presenting Officer at Vincent Elegba's (John Omole) appeal hearing, she concludes that there is not enough evidence that Vincent is homosexual. The immigration judge overrules her decision to end the hearing.
Immigration Judge	10–11 February	Michael Cochrane	The immigration judge at Vincent Elegba's (John Omole) appeal hearing, he sends Nana McQueen (Diane Langton) out, due to many disturbances, and then calls recess. Despite the H.O.P.O's claim that there is no evidence that Vincent is homosexual, he concludes that Vincent was confused about it and allows him asylum after Phoebe Jackson's (Mandip Gill) defence of him.
Reverend Clark	14 February – 30 July	Simon Burbage	Reverend Clark christens Rose Lomax. He later marries Patrick Blake (Jeremy Sheffield) and Maxine Minniver (Nikki Sanderson).
Sean	17–18 February	James Howard	Sean is a private investigator hired by Darren Osborne (Ashley Taylor Dawson) to find out what happened to Joe Roscoe (Ayden Callaghan). He lies to the Roscoes and Lindsey Butterfield (Sophie Austin) after being paid off by Fraser Black (Jesse Birdsall).
Doctor Simmons	18 February	Tina Harris	Doctor Simmons is a doctor who tells Darren Osborne (Ashley Taylor Dawson) and Nancy Osborne (Jessica Fox) that their son's, Oscar Osborne, cognitive hearing operation was a success.
Counsellor	19 February	Mark Chatterton	A counsellor who talks to John Paul McQueen (James Sutton) after he is raped.
Nurse	19 February	Sarah McDoanld Hughes	A nurse who Lindsey Butterfield (Sophie Austin) visits to have an abortion.
Boss	21 February	Grahame Fox	The boss at the club where Blessing Chambers (Modupe Adeyeye) works. After she tries throwing out Dennis Savage (Joe Tracini) he fires her.
Simon	24 February	Jeff Leach	Simon is a photographer who accompanies Nancy Osborne (Jessica Fox) to interview John Paul McQueen (James Sutton) after he saves Finn O'Connor's (Keith Rice) life. John Paul grows angry and later smashes Simon's camera.
Doctor Fenerty	26 February	Clive Hayward	Doctor Fenerty is a doctor who decides that Sienna Blake (Anna Passey) is mentally fit to leave the psychiatric centre.
Audiologist	27 February	Janine Birkett	An audiologist who switches on Oscar Osborne's cognitive hearing aids, allowing him to hear.
Defence Lawyer	27 February	Fiona Paul	A defence lawyer for Jason Roscoe (Alfie Browne-Sykes), she manages to get Maxine Minniver (Nikki Sanderson) to admit that she lied about Jason assaulting her.
Judge McCarthy	28 February – 24 June	Peter Pacey	A judge who grants Sienna Blake (Anna Passey) bail, after being blackmailed by Fraser Black (Jesse Birdsall). Later he is the judge at Grace Black's (Tamara Wall) trial for attempted murder. Grace plans to pay him off to find her innocent. He steps down as judge at Grace's trial after Mercedes McQueen (Jennifer Metcalfe) blackmails him over the pay off.
D.I. Banks	5 March 2014 – 30 August 2019	Drew Cain	D.I. Banks is a police officer who searches for Rose Lomax when she is kidnapped. He goes to interview Sienna Blake (Anna Passey), but she pretends not to be there. He later interviews Cleo McQueen (Nadine Rose Mulkerrin) and Holly Cunningham (Amanda Clapham) after the car accident they caused which led to the death of Rachel Hardy (Jennifer Brooke).
Chairperson	12 March	Maxine Finch	A chairperson at the hearing to decide whether Katy O'Connor should stay with Sinead Roscoe (Stephanie Davis) and Freddie Roscoe (Charlie Clapham) or be raised under the care of Diane O'Connor (Alex Fletcher) and Tony Hutchinson (Nick Pickard). She decides that Sinead and Freddie will keep Katy.
Solicitor	12 March	Erin Shanagher	A solicitor who represents Sinead Roscoe (Stephanie Davis) and Freddie Roscoe (Charlie Clapham) at the hearing.
Chaplain	14 March	Lee Garrett	A chaplain who christens Hilton Cunningham in the hospital.
Clerk	19–21 March	Nigel Collins	A clerk who asks John Paul McQueen (James Sutton) whether he is pleading guilty or not guilty. Later on he reads out Robbie Roscoe's (Charlie Wernham) changed statement.
Judge	21 March	Andrew Readman	A judge who sentences John Paul McQueen (James Sutton) to six months in custody.
P.C. Matthews	31 March – 22 October	Nicola Alexis	P.C. Matthews arrests Sinead Roscoe (Stephanie Davis) after she breaches the Child Protection Act. She later visits Grace Black (Tamara Wall) and Trevor Royle (Greg Wood) after Frankie Osborne (Helen Pearson) tells the police that they are trying to buy a baby. She leaves after Esther Bloom (Jazmine Franks) tells her that she willingly agreed to be a surrogate.
Mr Madden	3–4 April	Paul Ryan	Mr. Madden is a doctor who prepares Peri Lomax (Ruby O'Donnell) for her operation. He later tells the Lomax family that the operation was a success.
Doctor Preston	8 April	Christopher Jordan	Doctor Preston is a doctor who tells Patrick Blake (Jeremy Sheffield) that his vasectomy has reversed itself.
Police Detective	9 April	Richard Sutton	A police detective who arrests Grace Black (Tamara Wall) for the attempted murder of Joe Roscoe (Ayden Callaghan).
Doctor Wong	10 April	Anita Koh	Doctor Wong is a doctor who listens to Ste Hay's (Kieron Richardson) complaints about the psychiatric centre's treatment of Sinead Roscoe (Stephanie Davis).
Judge	15 April	Stephanie Preacher	A judge who grants Ste Hay (Kieron Richardson) bail, but sends him for further prosecuting at the Crown Court.
Chauffeur	17 April	Martin Oldfield	A chauffeur hired by Joe Roscoe (Ayden Callaghan) to kill Fraser Black (Jesse Birdsall). Due to Fraser leaving the car the chauffeur ends up leaving Sandy Roscoe (Gillian Taylforth) for dead after he gasses the car.
Doctor Harrington	17–18 April	Jon Edgley Bond	Doctor Harrington is a doctor who invites Cindy Cunningham (Stephanie Waring) to the Emergency Services Ball. Cindy leaves him at the ball after she realizes that she wants to be with Dirk Savage (David Kennedy).
Forensics Officer	23 April	Lisa Bowerman	A forensics officer who briefs Sam Lomax (Lizzie Roper) about Fraser Black's (Jesse Birdsall) death.
Sonographer	29 April	Zoe Matthews	A sonographer who performs Maxine Minniver's (Nikki Sanderson) ultrasound. She calls in Doctor Brampton after she thinks that the mucal translucency is thicker than normal.
Doctor Brampton	29 April – 15 July	Clare McGlinn	Doctor Brampton is a doctor who is called into Maxine Minniver's (Nikki Sanderson) ultrasound, where she informs Maxine that her baby's mucal translucency is thicker than normal. She later informs Maxine of the chances of her baby suffering from Down syndrome and informs about the tests that could diagnose it. She later treated Maxine after she fell down the stairs after an altercation with her fiancé Patrick Blake (Jeremy Sheffield). Doctor Brampton suspects domestic abuse and hands Maxine a card to a women's refuge.
P.I. Michael Hendry	29 April–1 May	Alan Ruscoe	Michael is a private investigator hired to find Tyson Delany. He interviews George Smith (Steven Roberts) after he uses Blessing Chambers' (Modupe Adeyeye) credit card, he then blackmails Blessing. He later collects some of the blackmail from Blessing, but threatens to reveal her secret if he doesn't get the rest. He leaves after receiving the blackmail money.
Doctor Jones	30 April	Marvyn Dickinson	Doctor Jones is a doctor who informs Patrick Blake (Jeremy Sheffield) that he had ingested the drug GHB.
Grandma Sheila	30 April–2 May	Christine Cox	Sheila is Holly Cunningham's (Amanda Clapham) paternal grandmother. She walks in on Holly and Jason Roscoe (Alfie Browne-Sykes) getting amorous on her sofa. She agrees to let them stay the night, but tells them that they must leave the following morning. She acts hostile towards Holly the following morning, but later apologizes for her behaviour and gives Holly some family heirlooms. She later calls Dirk Savage (David Kennedy) to collect Jason and Holly. When Dirk arrives she tells him that Jason and Holly had left.
Bailiff	6 May	Paul Bell	A bailiff who repossesses the McQueen family's TV after Nana McQueen (Diane Langton) falls behind with debt payments.
Doctor	6 May	Christopher Chilton	A doctor who examines Sienna Blake's (Anna Passey) shoulder after she claims to have fallen in the shower.
Security Guard	7 May	Jonny Emmett	A security guard who catches Sinead Roscoe (Stephanie Davis) trying to break into the staff lockers, he pursues and apprehends her until Sonny Valentine (Aaron Fontaine) shows up.
Phil	12 May	George Brockbanks	Phil is a worker at a student bar that Jason Roscoe (Alfie Browne-Sykes) and Holly Cunningham (Amanda Clapham) visit looking for a job. He rejects Jason's application, but offers it to Holly.
D.C. Morris	13 May	Matthew Jure	D.C. Morris arrests Blessing Chambers (Modupe Adeyeye) for credit card fraud.
The Vamps	15 May	Themselves	The Vamps are a band that perform a concert that Sienna Blake (Anna Passey) and Peri Lomax (Ruby O'Donnell) attend. The next day Peri meets the band and gets their autograph.
Adjudicator	20 May	John Gully	An adjudicator who dines at The Hutch.
Denise	22 May – 12 June	Janet Bamford	Denise is Sienna Blake's (Anna Passey) daughter's adoptive mother. When Sienna and Leela Lomax (Kirsty-Leigh Porter) arrive she tells then that Sienna's daughter has run away, however this is a lie as Denise has been paid off by Patrick Blake (Jeremy Sheffield). Denise later lies to Sienna that her daughter is playing hockey. After Sienna leaves, Patrick tells Denise that Sienna's daughter has been spotted in Chester.
Claudine	23 May	Zoë Doano	Claudine is a student that Ziggy Roscoe (Fabrizio Santino) picks up, hoping to sleep with her. Due to interruptions from Joe Roscoe (Ayden Callaghan), Sandy Roscoe (Gillian Taylforth) and Lindsey Butterfield (Sophie Austin) he is unable to do so.
Petula Delaney	29 May – 22 August	Jo Martin	Petula Delaney is Blessing Chambers' (Modupe Adeyeye) mother. She arrives in the village and dines at The Hutch, where she tells Tony Hutchinson (Nick Pickard) that she is looking for her son, Tyson, unaware that it is Blessing. Respecting Blessing's wishes Tony does not tell Petula that Blessing is Tyson. After Blessing goes to hospital after collapsing from sepsis, Petula visits her. Petula is initially disgusted by Blessing's decisions, but after talking to her she decides that she understands Blessing, however when Blessing tries organizing a trip to visit her, Petula says it's not a good time before departing.
Doctor Peters	30 May	Jonathan Markwood	Doctor Peters is a doctor who tells Dennis Savage (Joe Tracini) that he doesn't have testicular cancer.
Stan	9 June – 5 September	Phil Rowson	Stan is a dealer who meets with Freddie Roscoe (Charlie Clapham) to cancel a deal with Grace Black (Tamara Wall). Freddie manages to get him to do a deal with him, however. Freddie later meets him to deal some steroids. Jason Roscoe (Alfie Browne-Sykes) later buys steroids off of him, but Stan stops dealing them to him after being cautioned by Freddie. Stan starts dealing the steroids to Jason again after Jason agrees to stash some drugs for Stan. Stan later tries selling some drugs to Peri Lomax (Ruby O'Donnell), but he is stopped by Cameron Campbell (Cameron Moore). He then goes to collect the steroids from Jason and gives him 24 hours to deliver them. When Jason is unable to get the steroids, or compensation money within the timeframe Stan threatens him causing Jason to agree to work for Stan as a drugdealer. Police later raid the squat where Stan is and arrest him.
Owen	11 June	John Phythian	Owen is a private investigator hired by Sienna Blake (Anna Passey) to find her daughter. He lies about being unable to find her after being paid off by Patrick Blake (Jeremy Sheffield).
Bouncer	12 June	Danny Thornton	A bouncer who tells Jason Roscoe (Alfie Browne-Sykes) that he is not allowed into The Loft as he doesn't look eighteen.
Announcer	17 June	Brennan Reece	An announcer who hosts the competition for student secretary between Tegan Lomax (Jessica Ellis) and Blessing Chambers (Modupe Adeyeye). After the speeches he announces that Blessing has won.
Doctor Corrigan	19 June	Stephen Rashbrook	Doctor Corrigan is a doctor that Blessing Chambers (Modupe Adeyeye) approaches to try to get her operation advanced. He refuses to do so.
Doctor	20 June	Perveen Hussain	A doctor who informs Cindy Cunningham (Stephanie Waring), Dirk Savage (David Kennedy) and Holly Cunningham (Amanda Clapham) that Hilton Cunningham may be suffering from Graft-versus-host disease.
Clerk	25 June	Michael Yale	A clerk who asks Grace Black (Tamara Wall) whether she is pleading guilty or not guilty for the attempted murder of Joe Roscoe (Ayden Callaghan).
Defence Barrister	25 June	Cal Freestone	A defence barrister for Grace Black (Tamara Wall), her questioning causes Joe Roscoe (Ayden Callaghan) to admit he was unsure whether Grace moved him to the crime scene, and Sonny Valentine (Aaron Fontaine) to admit that he didn't follow leads given by Grace's testimony.
Doctor Hargreaves	3 July	David Michaels	Doctor Hargreaves is a doctor who informs Freddie Roscoe (Charlie Clapham) that Grace Black (Tamara Wall) may be unable to have children.
Gazza	7 July – 9 September	Tomi May	Gazza is someone who threatens Rick Spencer (Victor Gardener) over debt. He tells Rick that if he doesn't receive his money in 24 hours he'll do something to Rick's children. He later threatens to take Jason Roscoe's (Alfie Browne-Sykes) car if Rick doesn't pay him the money.
Daryl	8 July – 26 November	Rhys Howells	Daryl is an electrician who Sinead Roscoe (Stephanie Davis) flirts with to make Tony Hutchinson (Nick Pickard) jealous. Sinead later pretends to sleep with him to try and forget about her and Tony, but after Tony discovers them he throws Daryl out. Sinead later goes on another date with him, but is disgusted by his antics on it. He is later invited to Tony and Diane O'Connor's (Alex Fletcher) wedding after Diane believes that he has gotten Sinead pregnant, but he is repulsed by the notion as he never slept with Sinead.
Sally	16–17 July	Eiry Thomas	Sally is a woman who shows Maxine Minniver (Nikki Sanderson) around the women's refuge. She calls the police when Patrick Blake (Jeremy Sheffield) arrives.
Police Officer	17 July	Stuart Wolfenden	A police officer who tells Patrick Blake (Jeremy Sheffield) that if he doesn't leave the women's refuge immediately he will arrest him.
Judge	22 July	Janet Walker	A judge who sends Joe Roscoe (Ayden Callaghan) to the Crown Court for further prosecuting.
Security Officer	29 July	Ken Christiansen	A security officer who takes Maxine Minniver (Nikki Sanderson) away after a knife is discovered in her bag when she is trying to board a plane.
P.C. Brooks	6 August	Stephen Fletcher	P.C. Brooks is a police officer who informs Leela Lomax (Kirsty-Leigh Porter), Tegan Lomax (Jessica Ellis), Ziggy Roscoe (Fabrizio Santino), Ste Hay (Kieron Richardson) and Cameron Campbell (Cameron Moore) that Danny Lomax (Stephen Billington) and Sam Lomax (Lizzie Roper) had been killed in a car accident. He accompanies Leela to identify the bodies.
Hannah Turner	7 August	Melanie Ash	Hannah Turner is a social worker who supervises the adoption of Hilton Cunningham by Dirk Savage (David Kennedy). She leaves after Cindy Cunningham (Stephanie Waring) expresses doubts about it.
Mrs Baxter	15 August	Louise Atkins	Mrs Baxter is a woman who meets Nico Blake (Persephone Swales-Dawson) pretending to be her father. She forces Nico to take her to Sienna (Anna Passey) as she believes that Sienna slept with her husband. Mrs Baxter then slaps Sienna before leaving the village.
Doctor Carter	21 August	Anu Hasan	Doctor Carter is a doctor who performs a check-up on Blessing Chambers (Modupe Adeyeye) before her operation. After learning that Blessing has been self-harming she decides that the operation should not be performed.
P.C. Stamp	22 August – 5 September	Rik Garrad	P.C. Stamp is a police officer who arrives at the Blake household after a disturbance is reported. Sienna Blake (Anna Passey) tells him that she got the cut from an accident. After a tip-off by Holly Cunningham (Amanda Clapham) he busts an illegal squat where he tries to arrest Jason Roscoe (Alfie Browne-Sykes), but he escapes. When he arrives at Holly's house to inform her that Cindy Cunningham (Stephanie Waring) has been found, he arrests Jason. He also informs Holly that Cindy is ill.
D.S. Glennie	28 August – 1 September	Annette Flynn	D.S. Glennie is a police officer who Nancy Osborne (Jessica Fox) goes to report the attempted rape on her. D.S. Glennie interviews Nancy on possible suspects and then arrests Robbie Roscoe (Charlie Wernham) for the attack. She then questions him over the attack. She later collects statements from Nancy, Robbie and John Paul McQueen (James Sutton) after Nancy realizes that it was Finn O'Connor (Keith Rice) who tried raping her. She then interrogates Finn over the attack and arrests him for raping John Paul and attempting to rape Nancy.
Forensics Officer	28 August	Michele Whitehead	A forensics officer who collects samples from Nancy Osborne (Jessica Fox) after Finn O'Connor (Keith Rice) attempts to rape her.
Judge Drake	2 September	Kate Spiro	Judge Drake is a judge who refuses to give Finn O'Connor (Keith Rice) bail.
Doctor Duffy	5 September	Jared Garfield	Doctor Duffy is a doctor who informs Nana McQueen (Diane Langton) that she has suffered from a minor stroke and does not have Alzheimer's disease.
Prison Guard	12 September	Emma Gregory	A prison guard who escorts Theresa McQueen (Jorgie Porter) to hospital after she claims to be having a baby. The prison guard flirts with Mercedes McQueen (Jennifer Metcalfe) until Theresa handcuffs her to the hospital bed.
Court Official	17 September	Iain Ormsby-Knox	A court official who asks Finn O'Connor (Keith Rice) whether he is pleading guilty or not guilty to the attempted rape on Nancy Osborne (Jessica Fox) and for the rape on John Paul McQueen (James Sutton).
WPC	19 September	Lyndsay Fielding	A woman police constable who questions Leela Lomax (Kirsty-Leigh Porter) on the whereabouts of Ziggy Roscoe's (Fabrizio Santino) on the night that Danny Lomax (Stephen Billington) and Sam Lomax (Lizzie Roper) were killed.
D.S. Anderson	22–24 September	Liam Tobin	D.S. Anderson is a police officer who arrests Patrick Blake (Jeremy Sheffield) for domestic abuse. He later approaches Maxine Minniver (Nikki Sanderson), but she says that whoever filed the report was lying. He later arrives to question Patrick, after Tom Cunningham (Ellis Hollins) reports him for abducting Sienna Blake (Anna Passey). However, when they arrive at Patrick's flat Sienna tells D.S. Anderson that it was Tom who abducted her, but she then says that she won't be pressing charges.
Nurse Yeardsley	22 September	Jenny May Morgan	Nurse Yeardsley is a nurse who tells Maxine Minniver (Nikki Sanderson) that her blood pressure has gone down.
Mrs Denver	29 September – 3 October	Candida Gubbins	Mrs Denver is an advocate for Finn O'Connor (Keith Rice) at his trial. She cross-examines the testimonies given by John Paul McQueen (James Sutton) and Nancy Osborne (Jessica Fox), and gets Nancy to admit that she had an affair with Rick Spencer (Victor Gardener). Mrs Denver later cross-examines Ste Hay's (Kieron Richardson) testimony and declares him an unreliable witness for the trial. She later cross-examines Robbie Roscoe (Charlie Wernham) and takes Finn O'Connor (Keith Rice), Diane O'Connor (Alex Fletcher), Patrick Blake (Jeremy Sheffield) and Frankie Osborne's (Helen Pearson) testimonies. She asks the jury to consider the points raised during the trial.
Mr Timmons	29 September – 3 October	Paul Brown	Mr Timmons is a member of court who takes the testimonies of John Paul McQueen (James Sutton), Nancy Osborne (Jessica Fox), Ste Hay (Kieron Richardson) and Robbie Roscoe (Charlie Wernham). He asks the jury to consider the points raised during the trial.
Clerk	29 September – 3 October	Jeffrey Longmore	A clerk present at the trial of Finn O'Connor (Keith Rice).
Judge	29 September – 3 October	Souad Faress	A judge presiding over the trial of Finn O'Connor (Keith Rice). She warns Ste Hay (Kieron Richardson) over his behaviour when he is cross-examined. After Finn is found guilty on both fronts she sends him for pre-sentencing.
Doctor Lewis	6 October	Kerri McLean	Doctor Lewis is a doctor who informs Grace Black (Tamara Wall) that due to her miscarriage it is unlikely that she will be able to carry a child.
D.I Gale	8 October 2014–20 January 2015	Chetna Pandya	D.I Gale is a police officer who handles the hostage situation created by Big Bob (Vincent Ebrahim). She calls in armed units, and gets snipers on the roofs after Big Bob shoots Freddie Roscoe (Charlie Clapham). After a second gunshot is heard, she storms the hospital with other police officers and Joe Roscoe (Ayden Callaghan). She later informs Joe that there may have been a second person assisting Big Bob. She later informs Dirk Savage (David Kennedy) that she needs to talk to Dodger Savage (Danny Mac) after Will Savage (James Atherton) is pushed off of the hospital roof.
Doctor Wilson	10 October – 5 November	Kriss Dosanjh	Doctor Wilson is a doctor who informs Cindy Cunningham (Stephanie Waring), Holly Cunningham (Amanda Clapham) and Dirk Savage (David Kennedy) that Cindy is showing symptoms of Bipolar disorder. He later goes to discharge Cindy, but after Jason Roscoe (Alfie Browne-Sykes) says that she believes that she is being poisoned, he withholds from discharging Cindy. He cancels a home visit for Cindy at her request. He collects Cindy from a home visit after Dirk tells him that Cindy is not stable enough to return home.
Marie	10 October	Maxine Burth	Marie is a counsellor at Patrick Blake's (Jeremy Sheffield) anger management sessions.
D.I. Banks	14 October 2014 – 20 May 2016	Helen Kay	D.I. Banks is a police officer who questions Sienna Blake (Anna Passey) after Patrick Blake (Jeremy Sheffield) is run over. After evidence is found she questions Maxine Minniver (Nikki Sanderson) over the incident. She later tells Dodger Savage (Danny Mac) that Maxine has been charged with attempted murder. She later interviews Peri Lomax (Ruby O'Donnell) following an incident where painkillers were sold. She also goes to interview Nancy Osborne (Jessica Fox) over the incident, but Jack Osborne (Jimmy McKenna) lies by saying that the painkillers were his. She later interviews Dylan Jenkins (James Fletcher) after Sienna accuses him of drugging and attempting to sexually assault Nico Blake (Persephone Swales-Dawson). After Dylan leaves an anonymous tip-off to frame Trevor Royle (Greg Wood), D.I. Banks searches The Loft for drugs, but she finds nothing after Dylan hides them from her. She later lets Pete Buchanan (Kai Owen) off without charge after Cleo McQueen (Nadine Rose Mulkerrin) supports his alibi.
D.I. Marsh	15 October	Daniel York	D.I. Marsh is a police officer who interviews Carmel Valentine (Gemma Merna) over the evidence she gave against Sonny Valentine (Aaron Fontaine).
Judge	15 October	David Woodcock	A judge who sends Maxine Minniver (Nikki Sanderson) to the Crown court for further prosecuting. He also tells her that due to the seriousness of the crime she will not be receiving bail.
Mr Philpot	16–17 October	David Lonsdale	Mr Philpot is an antique collector who is scammed by Dennis Savage (Joe Tracini), after seeing this Freddie Roscoe (Charlie Clapham) decides to try and scam him as well. They meet up the next day, and after Mr Philpot offers Freddie a lower price than what Freddie wanted, Sinead Roscoe (Stephanie Davis) steps in and helps Freddie convince Mr Philpot to pay more.
Doctor Jones	17 October	Buckso Dhillon-Woolley	Doctor Jones is a doctor who briefs Grace Black (Tamara Wall), Esther Bloom (Jazmine Franks) and Trevor Royle (Greg Wood) on surrogacy, and how it will work.
Receptionist	20 October	Jenny Funnell	A receptionist who rejects the credit card that Sinead Roscoe (Stephanie Davis) tries to check out with. When Diane O'Connor (Alex Fletcher) later arrives at the hotel the receptionist tells her that she saw her fiancé, Tony Hutchinson (Nick Pickard), with another woman.
Doctor Scott	23 October	Natasha Jayetileke	Doctor Scott is a doctor who tells Tegan Lomax (Jessica Ellis) that tests say that she is pregnant. She then tells Tegan about some abortion options.
Doctor Penn	24 October	Annette Ekblom	Doctor Penn is a doctor who tells Tegan Lomax (Jessica Ellis) that her cancer has returned in the form of MDS.
PC Ali	27 October	Jamie Baughan	PC Ali is a police officer who goes to the McQueen household after Theresa McQueen (Jorgie Porter) reports Carmel Valentine (Gemma Merna) for putting her children in danger.
Tim	27 October	Tom Shaw	Tim is an orderly who tries to comfort Blessing Chambers (Modupe Adeyeye) after she is rejected for gender-confirmation surgery. He later sees her at the coffee shops and gives her his number so they can find a private doctor.
Doctor Robinson	28 October	Charlie Carter	Doctor Robinson is a con artist who tricks Blessing Chambers (Modupe Adeyeye) into paying for gender reassignment surgery. When she returns for the surgery she finds that Doctor Robinson has left with her money.
Policeman	29 October	Curtis Flowers	A policeman who searches through Trevor Royle's (Greg Wood) van after Dennis Savage (Joe Tracini) reports that there are diamonds in there. After the policeman searches the van and doesn't find any, he cautions Dennis for wasting police time.
Connor	31 October 2014 – 5 June 2015	Jonno Davies	Connor is a man who assaults Robbie Roscoe (Charlie Wernham) after he's late to a drop-off. It is later revealed that Connor and Ste Hay (Kieron Richardson) had a one-night stand and as a result, Ste may have HIV. After Ste tests positive for HIV he confronts Connor over it. Ste later meets Connor at a clinic and they sleep together again.
Roger	4 November	Jeff Alexander	Roger is a worker at the rehabilitation center that Ste Hay (Kieron Richardson) goes to. He supervises a group therapy session which Ste walks out of, and after Ste turns another patient in for dealing drugs he is congratulated by Roger.
P.C. Rowe	5 November	Tanya Vital	P.C. Rowe is a police officer who takes Holly Cunningham's (Amanda Clapham) statement after she nearly drowns in the lake.
P.C. Bishop	6 November	Luke Harris	P.C. Bishop is a police officer who is assigned to protect the McQueen family. He escorts Porsche McQueen (Twinnie-Lee Moore) and Theresa McQueen (Jorgie Porter) when they go to buy flowers.
D.I. Phillips	7–13 November	Stephen Marzella	D.I. Phillips is a police officer who interviews Carmel Valentine (Gemma Merna) after she escapes from Sonny Valentine (Aaron Fontaine). He later interviews Sienna Blake (Anna Passey) after her car causes a train crash.
Priest	10–11 November	Eric Potts	A priest at the wedding of Lockie Campbell (Nick Rhys) and Porsche McQueen (Twinnie-Lee Moore). After an interruption from John Paul McQueen (James Sutton) he marries Lockie and Porsche.
Sergeant Crammer	17 November	Keiran Flynn	Sergeant Crammer is a police officer who arrests Maxine Minniver (Nikki Sanderson) after she breaks the conditions of her bail.
Paris Lees	18 November	Herself	Paris Lees is a transgender activist who meets with Blessing Chambers (Modupe Adeyeye) in Blackpool.
Roxy	18 November	Misha Timmins	Roxy is a barmaid who works with Blessing Chambers (Modupe Adeyeye) in Blackpool. She accompanies Blessing when she finds diamonds in a cushion that Blessing owns.
Vicar	26–27 November	Yonah Odoom	A vicar who is present at the wedding of Tony Hutchinson (Nick Pickard) and Diane O'Connor (Alex Fletcher). She marries the couple, even after Diane leaves temporarily.
Mrs Collins	3–4 December	Kate Coogan	Mrs Collins is a defense lawyer for Maxine Minniver (Nikki Sanderson) at her trial. She collects the testimony of Patrick Blake (Jeremy Sheffield) and questions why he didn't report Maxine beforehand after he claimed he was in an abusive relationship with her. After Dodger Savage (Danny Mac) bursts into the courtroom, she tells him that his evidence has no bearing on the case. She later collects Maxine's testimony and asks the jury to consider the points raised in the trial.
Mr Khan	3–4 December	Kammy Darweish	Mr Khan is a prosecution lawyer at the trial of Maxine Minniver (Nikki Sanderson). He collects Maxine's testimony and asks the jury to consider the point raised in the trial.
Judge	3–4 December	Stephen Tomlin	A judge at the trial of Maxine Minniver (Nikki Sanderson). He orders the removal of Dodger Savage (Danny Mac) after he bursts into the courtroom.
Policeman	23 December	Alexander Newland	A policeman who arrests Ste Hay (Kieron Richardson) after mistaking him for John Paul McQueen (James Sutton).
Little Dodger	24 December	Freddie Phillips	Little Dodger is featured in a fantasy flashback where Dodger Savage (Danny Mac) and Sienna Blake (Anna Passey) have the perfect Christmas.
Little Sienna	24 December	Amy Jayne	Little Sienna is featured in a fantasy flashback where Dodger Savage (Danny Mac) and Sienna Blake (Anna Passey) have the perfect Christmas.
Rugby Hunk	24 December	Ben Foden	A rugby hunk who helps John Paul McQueen (James Sutton) and Lockie Campbell (Nick Rhys) get to John Paul and Ste Hay's (Kieron Richardson) wedding. He is also present at the wedding and reception.
Vicar	24 December	Philip Broadbent	A vicar who marries John Paul McQueen (James Sutton) and Ste Hay (Kieron Richardson).
Johnno	30–31 December	James Bartlett	Johnno is a thug hired by Freddie Roscoe (Charlie Clapham) to mug Joe Roscoe (Ayden Callaghan). He later tells Joe that Freddie had hired him to mug him.
Adam	31 December	Des Yankson	Adam is a psychologist at a talk that Jason Roscoe (Alfie Browne-Sykes), Sandy Roscoe (Gillian Taylforth) and Rick Spencer (Victor Gardener) attend about Jason's eating disorder.
