= Danny Lomax =

Fictional character from Hollyoaks

- Hollyoaks character
- Portrayed by: Stephen Billington
- Duration: 2013–14
- First appearance: 8 July 2013
- Last appearance: 5 August 2014
- Introduced by: Bryan Kirkwood
In-universe information
- Occupation: Drama teacher
- Sisters: Libby Lomax
- Wife: Sam Lomax (until 2014)
- Sons: Ste Hay
- Daughters: Leela Lomax; Tegan Lomax; Peri Lomax (adoptive)
- Grandsons: Lucas Hay; Daniel Lomax; Noah Dexter
- Granddaughters: Peri Lomax; Dee Dee Hutchinson; Leah Barnes (adoptive); Hannah Hay-O'Connor; Rose Lomax (adoptive); Clara Dexter; Steph Cunningham-Lomax (adoptive)
- Other relatives: Steph Cunningham-Lomax

Danny Lomax is a fictional character from the British soap opera Hollyoaks, played by Stephen Billington. The character and casting were announced in July 2013, with Billington making his first appearance on 8 July. Billington, who had previously appeared on Coronation Street, was happy to be cast on another soap. He had previously auditioned for another role on Hollyoaks but was glad he did not receive it as he preferred Danny's character. Danny was introduced as a new drama teacher and as a love interest of John Paul McQueen (James Sutton). Danny was characterised as being charming, caring and secretive, with it being teased that Danny has many secrets that would come out. It is revealed that Danny is happily married to Sam Lomax (Lizzie Roper) whilst having a relationship with John Paul. Sam and her daughters with Danny – Tegan (Jessica Ellis), Leela (Kirsty-Leigh Porter) and Peri Lomax (Ruby O'Donnell) – later move to Hollyoaks. Danny is also revealed to be the father of established character Ste Hay (Kieron Richardson) and the two develop a father-son relationship. Hollyoaks producer, Bryan Kirkwood, introduced the Lomaxes in order to give Ste a family unit on the soap. The family deal with various dramas, including Tegan giving birth and Peri's brain tumour.

Danny and John Paul struggle to keep their distance from each other and they are caught kissing on camera. Billington revealed that Danny believes that his affairs do not impact his family life or marriage, but his affair with John Paul is having an effect due to Danny loving him. Billington believed that John Paul and Danny were well suited for each other due to John Paul's caring personality which shows some of the goodness that Danny has lost. The pair's romance led to a storyline regarding homophobic bullying. Danny and John Paul's affair is eventually revealed, and Danny ends up cheating on Sam again with George Smith (Steven Roberts). Danny is also later revealed to be Peri's grandfather due to Peri being the daughter of Leela and Cameron Campbell (Cameron Moore). Billington later left the role and made his last appearance on 5 August 2014. Danny and Sam decide to leave Hollyoaks in order to escape, but as they are leaving they are killed in a car crash, which had been kept a secret until broadcast. It is later revealed that Cameron is the driver who murdered the couple and he is arrested for his crimes.

== Casting and characterisation ==
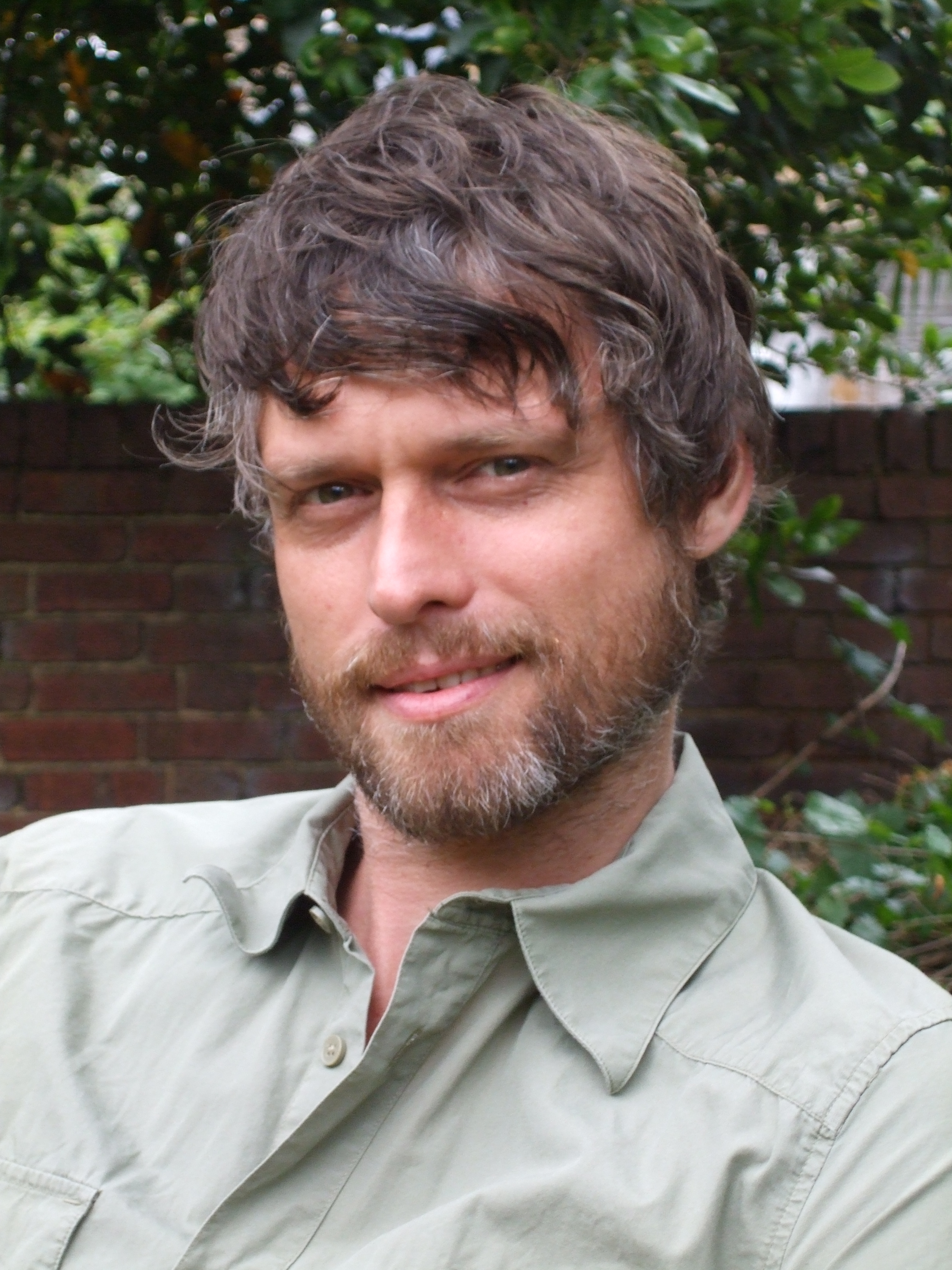
Stephen Billington's casting as Danny was announced in July 2013.

"Ladies and gents, we give you the charismatic, the charming, the pretty-sweeting-captivating: Mr Danny Lomax. Danny is a thoughtful, intelligent, articulate and well respected member of the teaching profession. He's popular with his pupils thanks to his wit and youthful approach to life, and he's popular with - well, just about everyone else - thanks to that cheeky twinkle in his eyes..."

— A writer from the Hollyoaks website on Danny (2013)

On 1 July 2013, it was announced that former Coronation Street actor Stephen Billington had been cast on Hollyoaks as newcomer Danny Lomax, with it being reported that Billington had already begun filming and would debut later that month. It was also reported that Danny, a new teacher at Hollyoaks High, would be a new love interest for his colleague John Paul McQueen (James Sutton), and that Danny has many "skeletons" in his closet which could impact other characters in the soap. Billington had been hoping to be cast in another soap opera for several years, and had previously auditioned for Hollyoaks in 2012 for a different role, which he was glad to not received as "Danny is so fun to play". Billington enjoyed working on Hollyoaks and called it a great place to work, explaining that "Everyone is friendly and professional so it's a joy to be here". The actor joked that it is always "funny" when he has to snog another actor that he has just met. He added that he had been recognised in public a few times by fans, which he thought was "quite nice because I'm quite a shy person!"

When asked to sum up the character in five words, Billington said, "Charming, fun, caring, complex, secretive". Billington said that he and Danny are somewhat similar as they both teach and get on with younger people, but revealed that Danny has a "whole side to him that's completely different" to the actor. Billington did not elaborate, but confirmed that that side would be "revealed over time". The actor added, "You'll still like [Danny], but he's much more complex than he first appears. Aren't we all?" Billington later told Digital Spy that he hoped that viewers would still like Danny after the reveal of his secrets, adding that Danny is able to charm his way out of "difficult situations", with the actor hoping that he would be able to do the same with the audience. He specified that Danny is "definitely not a bad person", adding:

"He's just a bit of a free spirit and he likes getting his own way. Perhaps he's a bit greedy too, but when it comes down to it, he's a fundamentally good guy so it's not like he's going to start murdering people or being evil. I know I'm going to get told off by some of the fans, but hopefully they'll warm to him and like him. It's always exciting to have someone who's slightly naughty in the cast, as it spices up the storylines."

== Development ==
=== Romance with John Paul ===
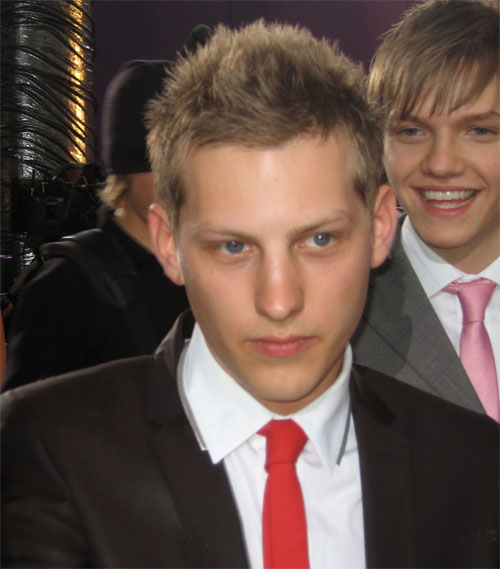
Danny was introduced as the love interest of John Paul McQueen, played by James Sutton (pictured).

When Danny begins working at Hollyoaks High, he catches the eye of teacher John Paul, who is "delighted" that Danny seems to be attracted to him. A "smitten" John Paul and Danny begin a relationship, but it was teased that Danny's secrets would come out and cause consequences for other residents. Hollyoaks producer Bryan Kirkwood revealed that Danny's romance with John Paul would not only mean that John Paul would "get his share of the action", but also lead to "dark and unexpected consequences" for other characters. Billington told Digital Spy that it was "really lovely" working with Sutton. Billington revealed that many fans of Sutton had followed him on Twitter – which Billington had signed up for when he joined the soap – and he was happy about receiving reactions from them. Billington believed that Danny and John Paul are a good match, explaining that John Paul appeals to Danny as he is such a good person, which attracts Danny as "it's some of the goodness that he's lost himself along the way". The actor added, "John Paul can also be quite vulnerable, so that brings out a side of Danny that wants to look after him. There'll certainly be times when Danny upsets John Paul, but there's a strong bond there. It actually surprises Danny that he feels so strongly for John Paul". Danny's relationship with John Paul later led to a "serious" storyline focussed on the homophobic bullying of John Paul, which developed into 2014. Hollyoaks executive producer Bryan Kirkwood that John Paul had made some "mistakes" in his relationship with the married Danny that would "come back to haunt him".

=== Paternity reveal ===
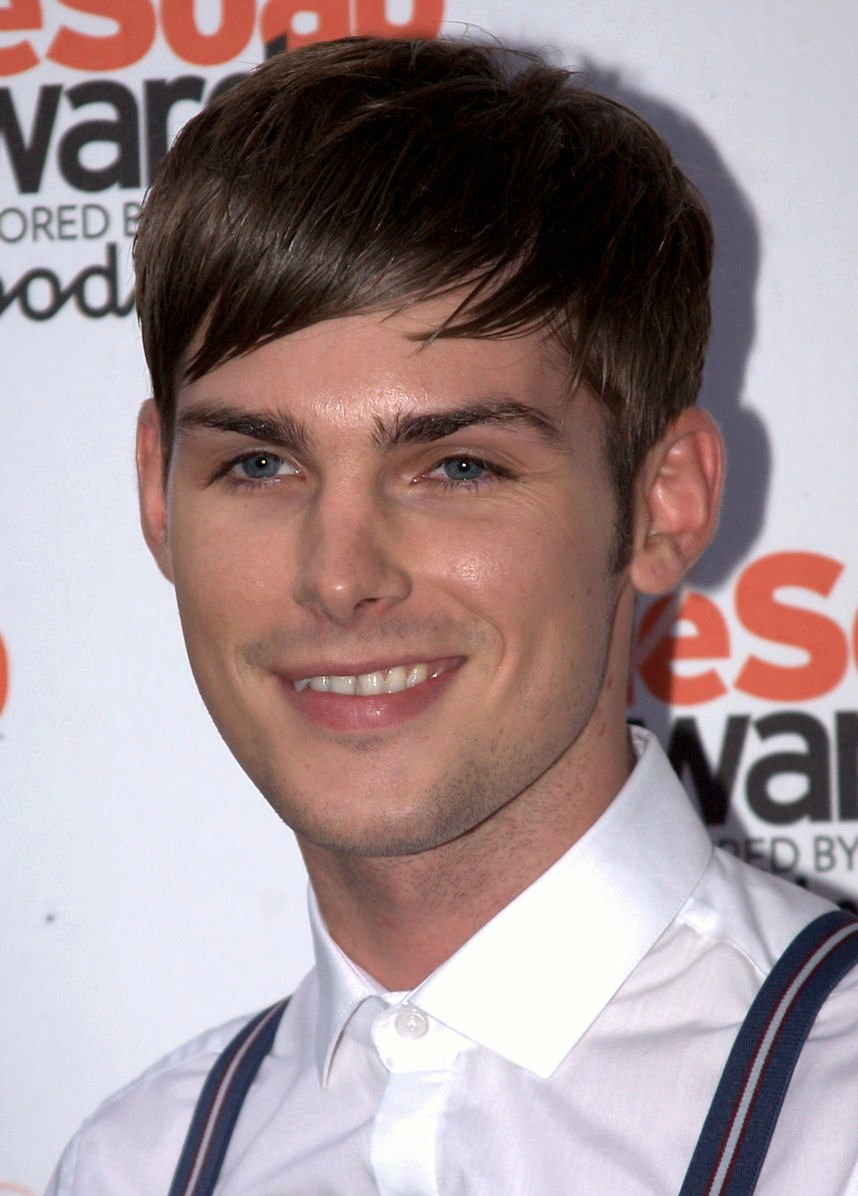
Kieron Richardson (pictured) portrays Ste Hay, who was revealed to be Danny's son.

In August 2013, Danny was revealed to be the father of established character Ste Hay (Kieron Richardson). This was not revealed to viewers before the airing of the episode, which saw Ste's partner Doug Carter (P. J. Brennan) phone Ste's father, who is revealed to be Danny. Billington was "absolutely thrilled" by this development as he believed that Ste was a great character that had a lot of stories revolving around him. He also believed that Richardson was a fantastic actor who he liked working with and that the storyline was a big opportunity, which he was enjoying. Billington added that he finally felt that he now belonged more at Hollyoaks due to now having a "pretty big storyline". He believed that the reveal would be a surprise to viewers and was happy that the audience found out before the other characters did, joking that viewers would be "screaming at the screen" due to the suspense. Billington had been aware "since the beginning" that Danny being revealed as Ste's father would be one of the developments for his character.

Speaking of Danny's backstory, Billington revealed that Danny had been trying to get in touch with Ste for years but was prevented by Ste's mother Pauline Hay (Pauline Hay), who "had her own reasons" for doing so. He revealed that Danny feels guilty for missing so much of his sons life, with the actor believing that Danny would have been a good father to Ste and might have kept him out of the trouble that he got into. Billington revealed that whilst Danny knows that he has a son in the village, he initially does not know that this son is Ste until after meeting him. The actor teased that the eventual reveal would be "dramatic and fun to watch", adding, "It's going to be a massive thing for Ste's character, because he's never met his dad before. Plus, with his mum dying recently, he's completely alone at the moment. The realisation that Danny is his dad, whenever that happens, will be a really great moment for both characters." Billington hoped that Danny would be able to take a "fatherly role" to Ste once the truth is revealed.

=== Introduction of family ===
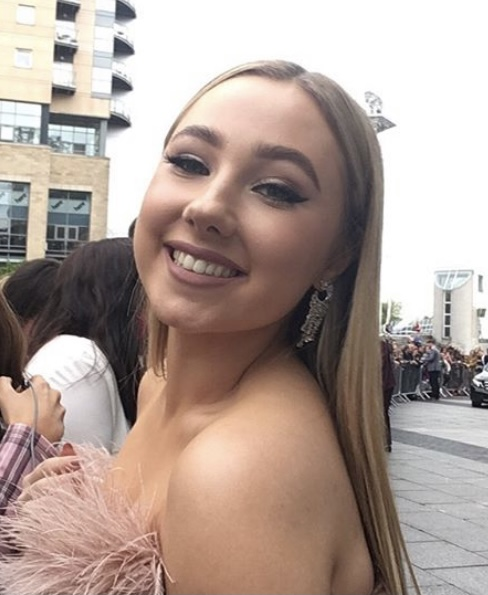
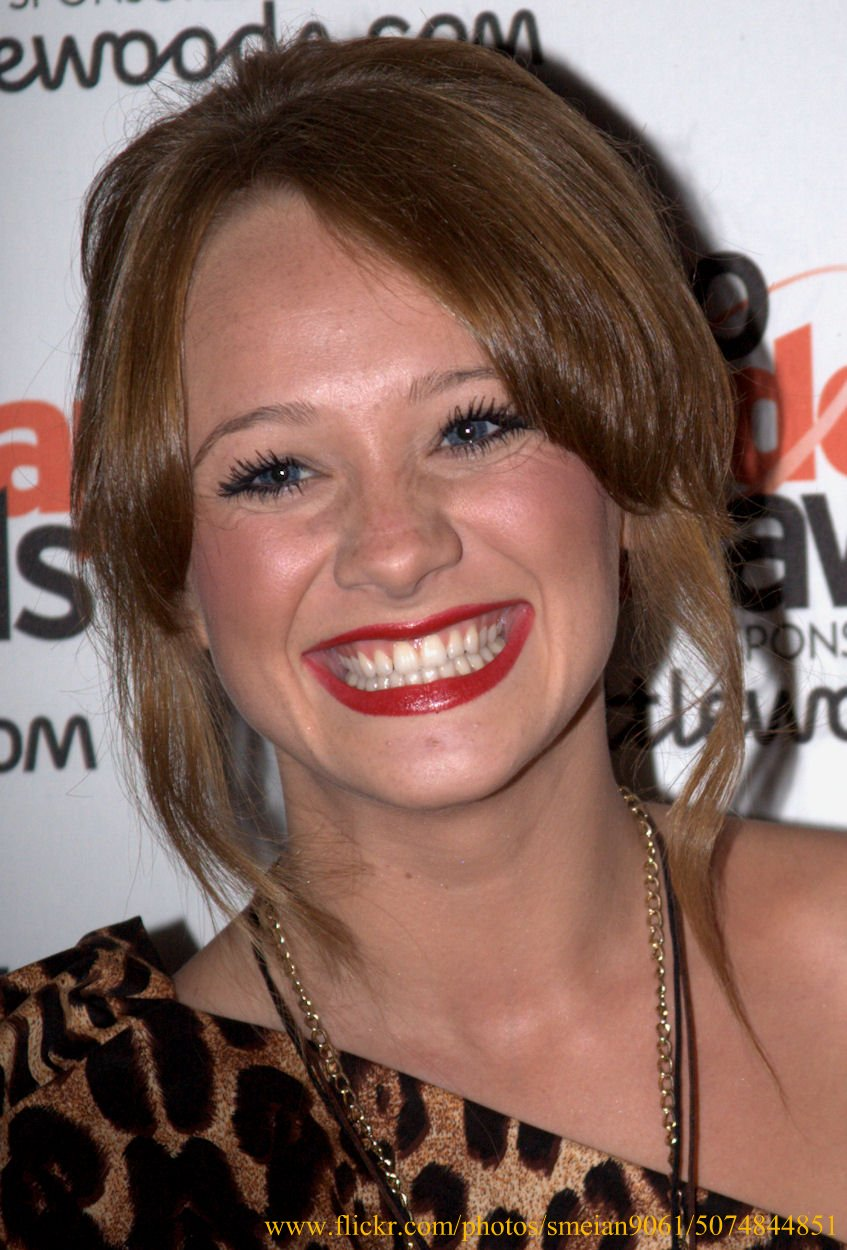
Ruby O'Donnell (left) and Kirsty-Leigh Porter (right) portray Peri and Leela Lomax, respectively

In the following episode, Lizzie Roper debuted on the soap as Sam Lomax, Danny's wife. Roper's casting and Sam's introduction had not been announced beforehand as Hollyoaks bosses wanted to surprise viewers. It had previously been teased that Danny would be seen getting into a woman's car, who it was not revealed until transmission that it was his wife. It was reported that Sam, who was billed as a "lioness" when it comes to her family, would be "prominent" character on the soap over the coming weeks as Danny "desperately" tries to juggle his "stable family life" and his secret relationship with John Paul. It was also announced that Danny and Sam's three daughters would join the soap later that year. Kirkwood had previously teased that soap would be introducing Ste's sisters to the Hollyoaks cast. Kirkwood had decided to introduce Ste's family as he believed that Ste was "undoubtedly one of our most important characters" of the soap and was conscious that he was "languishing on his own" without a family. Danny and Sam's daughters – Tegan (Jessica Ellis), Leela (Kirsty-Leigh Porter) and Peri Lomax (Ruby O'Donnell) debuted in October of that year. Their arrival brought more "family drama" for Danny due to a "shocking twist" where Tegan gives birth during her first appearance, having not known that she was pregnant. Billington explained that Danny loves and wants to be with Sam and wants to be the one to explain things to her in his own word. Billington called Danny's double life with her and John Paul "such a stress" and joked that he would not be able to do that due to it being "too much hassle". He added that while John Paul has been final about it "being over", Danny still holds a touch for him.

=== Affairs and family dramas ===
"Danny is bisexual and it's almost like he's compartmentalised his life. He's very happy with his wife and his family, but his job has given him the opportunity to pop around the country and indulge in the different side of himself. The unfortunate thing on this occasion is that his two lives have now collided into each other, so Danny is now in an awful situation".

— Lizzie Roper on Danny's love triangle (2013)

In November 2013, John Paul and Danny's romance is revisited when Danny supports and comforts John Paul after witnessing him being the victim of homophobic bullying. Danny admits that he wants a relationship with him again, but just as it "seems" that their affair is "back on", John Paul rushes to hospital after learning that his son Matthew McQueen (Malachy and Connor Birchall) is unwell. John Paul feels very guilty that he was with Danny when Matthew needed him "the most", whilst Danny follows John Paul to the hospital, desperate to make things work. John Paul's grandmother Marlena McQueen (Diane Langton) spots the pair's connection and encourages John Paul to do what makes him happy, but warns Danny to not hurt her grandson, threatening "serious consequences". The following month, Ste urges John Paul to end his affair with Danny before someone gets hurt, which then leads to a physical and verbal fight between the two.

In January 2014, Billington teased to Digital Spy that John Paul and Danny's storyline was not "quite over" despite the characters having kept their distance from each other, and speculated that things could become difficult for Danny later in the year due to the possibility of Sam finding out about the affair, which Billington speculated would cause "severe ructions". The actor hoped that the Lomax family would stay together despite the ructions, as he got along well with the actresses of his female family, calling them "brilliant actors" and "such a joy to work with". Billington had not seen the potential exposure of the affair in any scripts at that point, but speculated that Sam would beat up and punch Danny when she finds out, and that Danny's daughters would blame him too, particularly Leela. Billington hinted that Danny would toughen up when his affair is revealed. He believed that Danny's inability to be faithful is his "main weaknesses", and that Danny does not believe his affairs impact his family life, explaining:

"In an ideal world, it would always be a secret. He doesn't believe his relationships outside the marriage impact on it or the family. But his affair with JP is having an effect, because Danny loves him, which I don't think has happened before. He has had affairs, but he hasn't ever fallen in love with the person. He loves Sam and wants to be the one to explain things to her in his own words."

That same month, Hollyoaks aired a storyline where John Paul is raped by Finn O'Connor (Keith Rice), which Billington praised as he believed it was an important issue to raise and was impressed by the acting of the actors involved. Billington was surprised that John Paul did not go to Danny after the rape as "Danny is the person who would be there to support him". Billington revealed that in the scripts he read at that point, John Paul had still not confided in Danny about the rape, though he explained that Danny knows something is wrong with John Paul and keeps asking him about it. The actor called Danny not knowing about the rape a "huge" Elephant in the room and explained that Danny is frustrated that John Paul is not opening up to him and assumes that he is being distant with him as he does not want to get involved with a family man. Danny assumes that it is the homophobic bullying, which he knows about, and blames Robbie Roscoe (Charlie Wernham) about it, with Billington teasing that Danny could "have a go" at Robbie about it due to believing that he is completely to blame. The actor added that Danny does not "have a clue" about Finn, adding that "nobody would suspect Finn".

Billington revealed to All About Soap that Danny would "man up" in the following months, which he was pleased about, saying that it was nice to see Danny "with some balls for once" when he stands up to Robbie. He explained that when Danny discovers that John Paul's books and stationary have been vandalised with homophobic slurs, he decides to "do something about it" and then tells John Paul's grandmother about what John Paul has been going through and explains to her that is why he hit Robbie. That March, when John Paul faces prison after he attacks Robbie, Danny confronts Robbie in the schoolyard and urges him to do the right thing by confessing to the homophobic bullying campaign, knowing that time is running out for John Paul. The confrontation becomes physical when Danny loses his temper and warns Robbie that the truth will come out eventually. Danny supports John Paul and urges him to plead mitigating circumstances due to the homophobic bullying, which John Paul considers but ultimately does not do. Billington explained that pressure between John Paul and Danny has piled on because of "poor" John Paul's assault case.

=== Reveal of bisexuality ===
When John Paul is on bail awaiting sentencing, he gives Danny a "passionate farewell" before he is sent to prison. Billington explained that despite being "hardly more than a peck", it is a lingering and "really tender kiss" that is "full of the love they have for each other". The actor added that after not having had any physical contact with each other, John Paul and Danny are honest about how the feel about the other "in the relief" of John Paul being bailed. The kiss leads to Danny's affair being discovered by Peri, who catches them kissing via a hidden camera in her home, which she had set up after believing that the house was haunted. Billington believed that Danny thinks it is the "worst" that it is Peri that found out, as she is the one who loves Danny unconditionally. When Peri confronts Danny over the "betrayal", their argument has an "unexpected outcome" when she falls down the stairs leading to the Lomax home, which Leela witnesses from a distance. Billington explained that Leela believes that Danny has given Peri a little shove but he has actually not, and he is "beside himself" and "absolutely horrified" that his "little girl" has been hurt. Billington teased that it would be the beginning of a "really traumatic" week" for the Lomax family, with "one shock after another". Billington explained that is "high drama" for Danny as "it ends in a way that he would never have wished for, but that's convenient for him. Danny does tend to find himself in these situations where something bad happens but it actually suits him. Of course, that causes huge guilt". Peri is later revealed to have a brain tumour and she believes that it made her imagine seeing Danny and John Paul kissing, although she begins to doubt this. Billington teased that the affair would later be revealed to the whole family, and revealed that Danny would not be the one to confess to it.

In May 2014, Danny's bisexuality is publicly outed by Sienna Blake (Anna Passey), who believes that Peri is her biological daughter and is trying to tear the Lomax family apart in the hopes that Peri will come to her. Danny is set up to look like he is talking anonymously online to George Smith (Steven Roberts) via a gay dating app. This mortifies George, who tries to avoid Danny "at all costs" and tells him that he does not want to be involved. This leads to Danny's bisexuality being outed when Sienna Blake (Anna Passey) causes more drama for the family and messes with the sound board at the Hollyoaks High talent show, which leads to everyone – including the Lomax girls – hear Danny tell George he is bisexual when George confronts him backstage. Billington blamed Sienna for the situation, calling her "evil". Danny is also set up by Sienna to make it look like he has been messaging George on the dating website, and a furious Sam refuses to believe his innocence. Danny then ends up returning to his "cheating ways" when he meets up with George and, unable to resist temptation, shares a "shock kiss" with him. Billington explained that he is not sure if Danny has any real interest in George but that Danny thinks that "if he's being accused of something, he may as well be guilty of it!"

In July 2014, John Paul and Danny's romance is revisited when John Paul, who is trying to move on with his life, receives a cold response from a hungover Ste; he then heads to teach a class at an adult learning centre and is disappointed to see Danny having taken his place due to them having been double-booked. This results in a "farcical situation" where they bicker over who is the real teacher and introduce themselves to students. The high tensions reminds Danny of how much he cares for John Paul, but Daniel Kilkelly from Digital Spy hinted that Danny may be getting his hopes too high by wondering about a reunion with him.

=== Departure and aftermath ===
It is later revealed that Danny is actually Peri's grandfather as she is the biological daughter of Leela and Cameron Campbell (Cameron Moore). Producers had told Porter about the plot twist when she started on the soap, with the actress telling Inside Soap that the secret would be revealed later that year and hinting that things would not run smoothly due to Peri having been lied to for so long. Later, in order to get Peri away from Cameron, Sam and Danny decide to emigrate to New Zealand with Tegan and Peri, with Leela deciding to stay behind. Ste becomes hurt when he finds out that they are leaving without him. Peri does not want to go but hides her feelings and the Lomaxes prepare to leave Hollyoaks. Sam is determined that Cameron, who is desperate to not lose his daughter, must not find out that they are moving, but Ste accidentally reveals this to him during a confrontation. When Leela finds out that Peri does not want to move, she ends up revealing that she is her mother in the middle of a "huge row" over the decision, as she believes that Peri should have a choice over where she lives. O'Donnell revealed that this shocks Peri, and makes her feel confused as she does not understand why she has been lied to her whole life. Porter believed that it was the right thing for Leela to do, and teased that there would be more heartbreak, fights and drama. Leela's revelation throws the scheme to get Peri away from Cameron "into chaos", and Danny disowns Ste when he finds out that he revealed the emigration plans to Cameron.

In the final moments of the episode that aired on 5 August 2014, Sam and Danny are involved in a "shock car crash", with their lives hanging in the balance after their car hits a van and flips over. Although a car crash had been teased in Hollyoaks' summer trailer, Sam and Danny's involvement had not been announced and the couple's fate was not initially revealed, thought it was reported that Ste would have a "meltdown" and take an overdose from alcohol and drugs following the crash' fallout. The following episode confirmed that both Danny and Sam had died at the scene and Leela, Tegan and Ste are told the "tragic news" by the police. The scenes had been filmed in June 2014 but had been kept a secret in order to surprise viewers, with it being confirmed that Roper and Billington had left the soap. At the time of broadcast, Billington was already working on other acting projects.

It is revealed that Cameron was the driver who killed Danny and Sam. It is initially thought that Camera had hit them by accident, but in December 2015, it is revealed that Cameron targeted Danny and Sam deliberately, as he saw them driving and accelerated his car towards them. Camera drunkenly admits this to his brother Lockie Campbell (Nick Rhys) and says, "That's what happens when you come between me and my daughter". Cameron's murder of Danny and Ste marked the beginning of Cameron's serial killing on Hollyoaks.

== Storylines ==
Danny arrives as the new drama supply teacher of Hollyoaks High School to organise a production with John Paul McQueen (James Sutton). An attraction grows between the two and they kiss and go on a date, but when Danny is offered a permanent position at the school he tells John Paul that nothing else can happen between them. Danny later changes his mind and has sex with John Paul but he later ignores his calls. He then returns and pleads with John Paul for another chance, which he is given. Danny is warned by headteacher Patrick Blake (Jeremy Sheffield) to not mix his personal life with his professional role. When John Paul does not show up to a date, Danny retaliates by flirting with Ste Hay (Kieron Richardson). However, he runs off when he realises that Ste is his biological son. John Paul assumes that the pair have had sex but Danny denies this and confides in John Paul that he has a son, though he does not reveal that it is Ste. After having sex with John Paul, Danny secretly meets up with his wife, Sam Lomax (Lizzie Roper). Danny continues seeing John Paul behind Sam's back and is blackmailed by his student Robbie Roscoe (Charlie Wernham) over this, who threatens to expose his affair if he does not prevent his expulsion. Ste's husband, Doug Carter (P. J. Brennan), finds out that Danny is Ste's father and confronts him. After Doug is later killed in an explosion, Danny stops Ste from committing suicide and tells him that he is his father.

Danny's wife and daughters – Tegan (Jessica Ellis), Leela (Kirsty-Leigh Porter) and Peri Lomax (Ruby O'Donnell) – move to Hollyoaks and Ste moves in with them. Danny is shocked but happy when Tegan unexpectedly gives birth. When John Paul is raped, he does not tell Danny but he is aware that something is going on. Danny assumes that it is Robbie's homophobic bullying and confronts him. Peri later finds John Paul and Danny kissing on camera and confronts Danny over the betrayal, which results in Peri falling down the stairs. Peri is revealed to have a brain tumour and Danny tells Peri that her tumour made her imagine what she saw. Sam finds out about the affair but stays quiet. She later tells Danny and forgives her as he promises to not cheat on her again. However, Sam then finds out that Danny has an online gay dating profile, which was set up by Sienna Blake (Anna Passey) in order to drive the Lomax family apart. Danny finds out that the dating profile was speaking to George Smith (Steven Roberts), so he visits him and they end up kissing. Danny's bisexuality is outed to the whole school when Sienna messes with the sound system to broadcast Danny and George's conversation to the whole school.

It is revealed that Danny is in fact Peri's grandmother and that she is the daughter of Leela and Cameron Campbell (Cameron Moore). Danny and Sam decide to leave the village with their family when they find out that Cameron has been released from prison, wanting to keep Peri away from Cameron. However, Peri does not want to go, and when Leela reveals to her the truth about her parents, Danny and Sam decide to leave the village on their own. Before leaving, Danny disowns Ste when he finds out that he revealed to Cameron that they were leaving. Tegan and Peri secretly call Danny and Sam to ask them to pick them up, but as Sam and Danny are driving, another car smashes into them and kills them. The Lomax family is devastated to learn this, with Ste taking an overdose following a meltdown. Cameron is eventually revealed to be the other driver, but claims it was an accident. However, he later reveals that he targeted them on purpose as they were trying to take his daughter away. Cameron is eventually arrested for the murders of Danny and Sam alongside several other people that he killed. Leela names her second child, Daniel Lomax, after Danny.

== Reception ==
Early in Danny's stint, Billington felt that viewers were very "intrigued" by Danny, with the actor revealing that he had received many "very lovely" messages on Twitter, which he had signed up for when he joined the soap. Kilkelly called Danny being revealed as Ste's father a "shock" and "such a big Hollyoaks twist". Sophie Dainty believed that Peri discovering Danny's affair had put him in a "difficult position". Simon Timblick from Metro listed Danny as a long lost relative who "really shook up" Hollyoaks, writing "Remember when Ste Hay almost slept with teacher Danny Lomax on a drunken night out, who was then revealed to be his long-lost birth dad? Yikes!" A writer from Digital Spy placed Ste finding Danny and his family as one of Ste's most memorable moments, commenting that "Hollyoaks loves to give people whole new families more or less out of nowhere", and noted how despite Danny "being interested in Ste's future husband John Paul", Danny had still "come within a hair's breadth" of "getting off" with his own son. In November 2013, Daniel Kilkelly from the same website believed that Danny was "happily married" despite pursuing a relationship with John Paul, and wrote that it was clear than the two men's connection was "still much more than a friendship". Tina Campbell from Metro wrote that Danny's life was not "short of drama". Carena Crawford from All About Soap called Danny "dodgy" and a "dirty dog" and opined that Danny had been "up to his old tricks again" in regards to the storyline with George. Crawford also wrote "OMG!" in regards to Danny being outed by Sienna; Crawford was also surprised that the Lomax family were "stupid enough" to be taken in by Sienna's lies. Hollyoaks placed Ste and Danny's near encounter fourth on their "Top 10 Most Awkward Dating Moments in Hollyoaks History" compilation, with Ellis calling it "the daddy of all mix-ups".

David Brown from Radio Times wrote that tensions were running high and "there was an air of desperation" when Danny and Sam attempted to "evade Cameron's clutches". Brown also called the pair's crash a "shock" and reported how fans were wondering whether Danny and Sam had survived the crash, and questioned how the Lomax family would deal with the "fresh drama". A writer from the Daily Mirror called the car crash "devasting" and a "horror smash". Metro's Campbell called the reveal of Peri's true parentage an "inevitable emotional aftermath" and reported how fans were shocked by the crash, adding that whilst a car crash had been teased, she believed online reaction from fans showed that nobody "anticipated" that it would be Sam and Danny. Campbell reported on how some fans found the "huge surprise" of the crash "too much" and others were speculating over who the driver was. Campbell believed that Danny disowning Ste was one of the "most shocking things" of the episode, but added that "nothing prepared fans" for the "tragic twist" of the crash. Campbell also questioned if the Lomax family could "seriously take any more heartache" that week and whether it was possible for Danny and Sam to have survived. Campbell later wrote that she would be stocking up on "tissues in advance" in order to prepare for Sam and Danny's funeral, and commented on how viewers expressed their sadness on Twitter over the deaths.

Charlotte Tutton from the Daily Mirror attributed Danny's death as being one of the reasons why the Lomax family was one of the three most "cursed" families in Hollyoaks. In May 2015, Tutton's colleague, Natalie Corner, named the Lomax car crash that killed Danny as one of the soap's most "explosive" storylines from the past year, writing that "Hollyoaks is never worried about killing off characters without warning". Patrick McLennan from What to Watch wrote that the car crash had a "tragic outcome". Digital Spy's Kilkelly noted that Cameron's charms "fooled us all" as he made viewers believe that killing Danny and Sam was an accident. Kilkelly believed that the "horrifying" hit and run was one of Cameron's most villainous moments, commenting "how convenient" it was that the crash happened just as Danny and Sam were trying to take his daughter away.
