= Twinnie-Lee Moore =

English singer-songwriter and actress

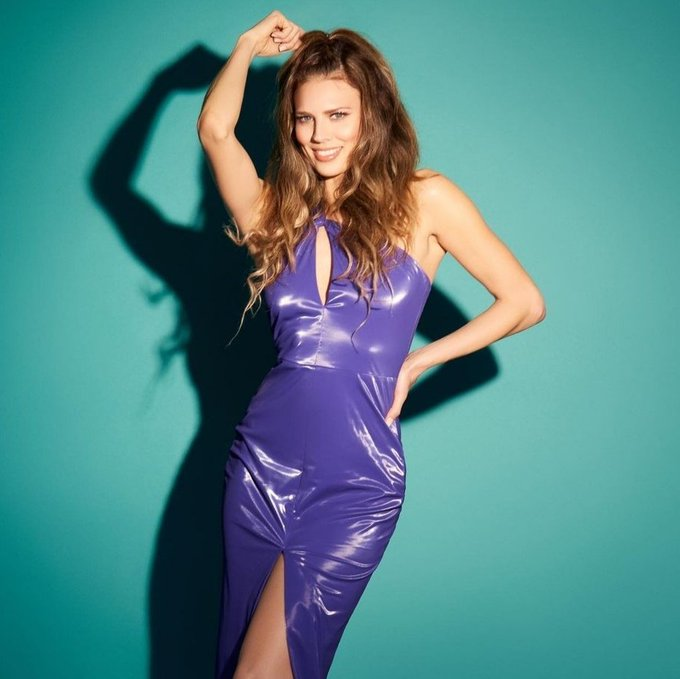

Background information
- Born: Twinnie-Lee Moore; 14 May 1987 (age 39); York, England
- Genres: Country pop, pop, country
- Occupations: Singer, songwriter, actress
- Instruments: Vocals; guitar; piano
- Years active: 2009–present
- Website: twinnieofficial.com

Twinnie-Lee Moore (born 14 May 1987) is an English country pop singer-songwriter and actress.

== Career ==
=== Theatre ===
In 2008, Moore played Ariel in the 2008 touring production of Footloose and in 2009, went on to play Velma Kelly in the 2009/10 touring version of the Kander and Ebb West End musical Chicago. She then appeared in A Chorus Line, in May 2010 at the Lowry in Manchester.

She was then cast as Jazmin in the stage musical Flashdance for its Shaftesbury Theatre production opening in October 2010. Moore played one of three friends who dance in a club, who together "sing practically the whole show".

Moore also went on to star in the West End premiere of Rock of Ages in the all-star ensemble and played the lead roles of Sherrie and Justice on many occasions. The show opened on 31 August 2011 at the Shaftesbury Theatre; Moore left the production at a cast change in September 2012.

=== Film ===
Moore starred as Monica in the drama The Wife, alongside Glenn Close, Max Irons and Christian Slater.

In 2014, Moore was cast as the part of Crazy Mary in the movie Ironclad: Battle for Blood.

=== Television ===
Moore played Nikki Allcott in Doctors which aired on BBC One on 29 July 2013.

In August 2014, it was announced that Moore would be joining the cast of Hollyoaks as Porsche McQueen as she made her first appearance on 4 November 2014. The character highlighted the issues of sexual abuse in children, whilst her other storylines included a failed marriage when her husband had various affairs. Moore left her role in October 2015, with her exit scenes airing on 24 December 2015. Moore was nominated for the British Soap Award for Best Newcomer and an Inside Soap Award in 2015 for her powerful portrayal.

In October 2024, she joined the cast of the British TV soap opera Emmerdale, portraying the character, Jade.

== Discography ==
=== Albums ===
Title	Album details
Hollywood Gypsy	Released: 17 April 2020; Label: BMG; Formats: CD, digital download
Something We Used to Say	Released: 8 November 2024; Label: IKAW Records; Formats: Digital download

=== Extended plays ===
Title	Album details
Twinnie	Released: 29 July 2016; Label: TLM Records; Formats: CD, digital download
Better When I'm Drunk	Released: 1 March 2019; Label: BMG; Formats: CD, digital download
Welcome to the Club	Released: 3 June 2022; Label: BMG; Formats: CD, digital download
Blue Hour (After Dark)	Released: 20 October 2023; Label: IKAW Records; Formats: CD, Digital download
Blue Christmas	Released: 24 November 2023; Label: IKAW Records; Formats: CD, Digital download
Blue Hour (Before the Dawn)	Released: 28 June 2024; Label: IKAW Records; Formats: CD, Digital download
