= Lizzie Roper =

British actress (born 1967)

- Born: Elizabeth Roper; November 1967 (age 58)
- Education: North London Collegiate School; Aberystwyth University; Guildford School of Acting
- Occupation: Actress
- Years active: 1993–present
- Height: 5 ft 4 in (163 cm)

Lizzie Roper (born November 1967) is a British actress.

== Career ==
Trained at the Guildford School of Acting after gaining a degree in drama from Aberystwyth University. Lizzie fell into Comedy whilst performing with Lenny Beige at The Regency Rooms as Sadie Beige -The Kosher chicken Giblet Queen of Whitechapel, Naomi Beige and Rita Poonarni-a brash Spanish singer with a penchant for Shirley Bassey numbers. In the late 1990s Roper also Performed stand Up and regularly hosted her own club, 'Loonatics at the Asylum' on Rathbone Place W1 as well as regular appearances on the Edinburgh Fringe. Her first major TV role was in The Worst Week of My Life playing Trish in 2004. In the same year, Roper appeared alongside Christian Slater in the West End production of One Flew Over The Cuckoo's Nest. In 2005 Roper was performing at the Edinburgh Festival With Alan Davies and Bill Bailey in The Odd Couple. In 2006, Roper devised and appeared in her second solo show, Peccadillo Circus at the Edinburgh Festival. It garnered a nomination for The Stage's Best solo Performance and transferred to the West End at the Trafalgar Studios before going on a National Tour. For the role she researched and interviewed members of the public about their sex lives.

In 2011, Roper was in the West End musical comedy Betwixt!. taking over from Ellen Greene. From 2013 to 2014, Roper appeared as Sam Lomax in Hollyoaks. When she finally left she went straight back to The Edinburgh Fringe Festival in another one woman show in which she played the journalist Julie Burchill in Julie Burchill: Absolute Cult, a play written by Tim Fountain and directed by Mike Bradwell. In 2015 and 2016, Roper appeared as Jackie in Boy Meets Girl, a romantic comedy in which the main character is a transgender woman. In 2020, she was a signatory alongside Alexander Armstrong, Simon Fanshawe and Frances Barber in the Sunday Times calling out hate speech,‘the appalling hashtag #RIPJKRowling is just the latest example of hate speech directed against her and other women. #IStandWithJKRowling' .

She has appeared as herself in Alan Davies: As Yet Untitled, Celebrity Storage Hunters, The Wright Stuff, Jason Manford on Absolute Radio and Co-hosted on LBC regularly with Jenny Eclair.

Since 2009, Roper portrays Mabel in adverts for Aunt Bessie's.

From September 2022 until April 2023, Roper has been presenting the weekend mid-morning show on BBC radio across the Channel Islands, having previously presented BBC Radio Guernsey’s weekday mid-morning show from October 2021 to January 2022.

== Selected filmography ==
Year	Title	Role	Notes
2004	The Worst Week of My Life	Trish	TV series, 4 episodes
2005	Family Affairs	Roxanne	TV series, 5 episodes
2008	Angus, Thongs and Perfect Snogging	Becky	
2008-2009	The Pinky and Perky Show	Various Comedy Cameos	TV series, 37 episodes
2009	Being Human	Maggie	TV series, 1 episode
2009	Wish 143	Nurse	Short film
2010	Him & Her	Paris	Series 1, Episode 5, “The Parents”
2010	New Tricks	Tilly Shaw	TV series, 1 episode "Dark Chicolate" (S7:E4)
2011	Waterloo Road	Jackie Stack	TV series, 2 episodes
2011	This Is Jinsy	Jinsy Player	TV series, 7 episodes
2012	Silent Witness	Sandra	TV series, 2 episodes
2012	Dead Boss	Top Dog	TV series, 6 episodes
2013	The Search for Simon	Paris	
2013-2014	Hollyoaks	Sam Lomax	Regular role, 111 episodes
2015	Boy Meets Girl	Jackie	TV series, 6 episodes
