= Kirsty-Leigh Porter =

English actress

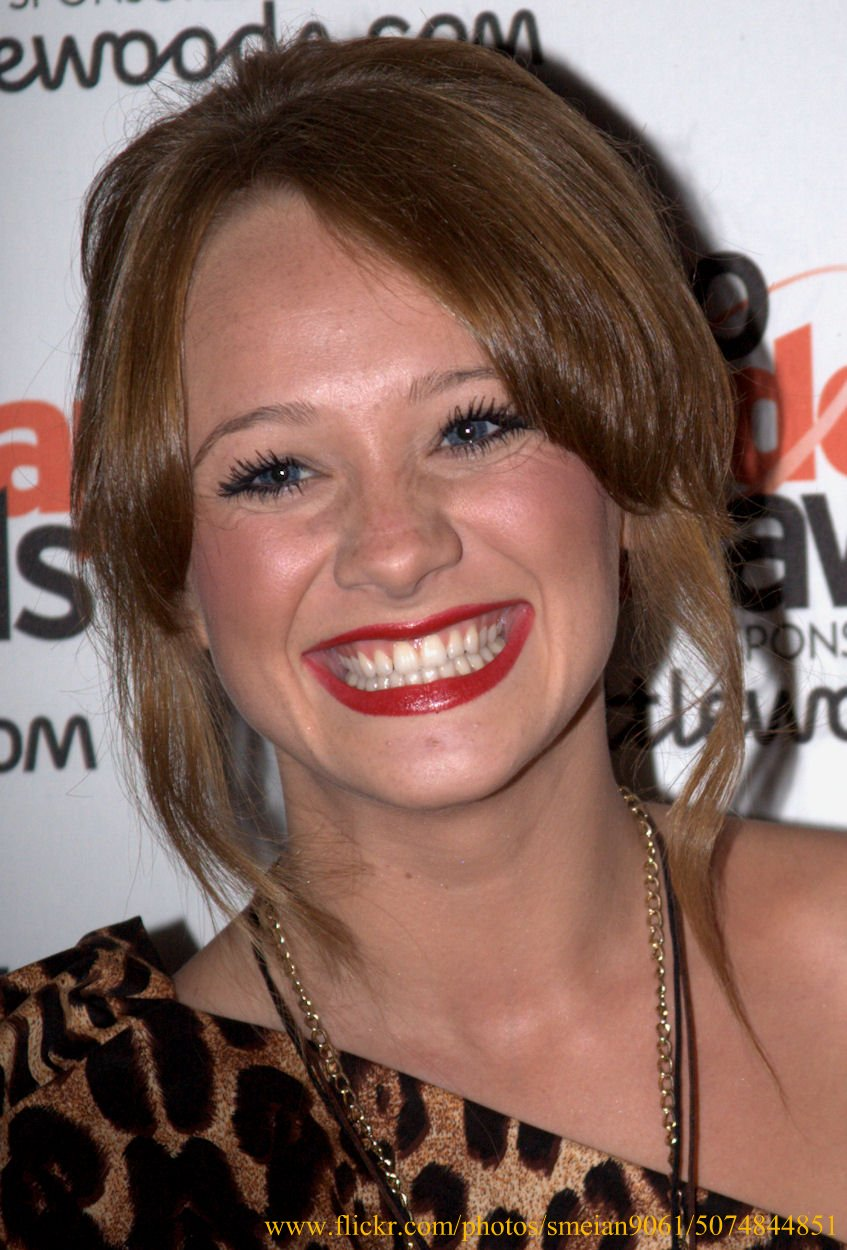
- Porter in 2010
- Born: 30 December 1988 (age 37); Manchester, England
- Occupation: Actress
- Years active: 2006–present
- Children: 2

Kirsty-Leigh Porter (born 30 December 1988) is an English actress, known for her roles in British soap operas, including portraying Zoe Willson on Coronation Street, Roz Fielding on Emmerdale and Leela Lomax on Hollyoaks.

== Career ==
Porter attended Oldham Theatre Workshop and trained extensively in dance including ballet, jazz, contemporary and modern dance. She has played a number of small roles on British television, including Doctors, The Royal Today, Shameless and Ashes to Ashes. Porter went on to have larger roles in the children's television programme My Spy Family, as Marcy, and The Street as Ellie.

It was announced in July 2009 that Porter had been cast in the long-running ITV soap opera Coronation Street as the girlfriend of long established character David Platt (Jack P. Shepherd). After her role in Coronation Street, Porter was cast in another ITV soap, Emmerdale, as the best friend of Holly Barton (Sophie Powles). Her role in Emmerdale as Roz, included pushing Holly into taking illegal drugs, and stealing to fuel her addiction. At the end of the storyline, it was announced that Porter would be leaving the soap. On 26 June 2013, it was announced that Porter would be joining the cast of Hollyoaks and over a month later it was announced she would play Leela Lomax, one of established character Ste Hay's (Kieron Richardson) two half-sisters.

In September 2023, Channel 4 announced Porter as one of the contestants on Celebrity SAS: Who Dares Wins.

== Filmography ==
Year	Title	Role	Notes
2006, 2009	The Street	Tarty Schoolgirl 1 / Ellie	3 episodes
2007–2009	My Spy Family	Marcy Desmond	7 episodes
2007	Brain Warehouse	Brain Bouncer	Television film
2007	The Bad Mother's Handbook	Anya	Television film
2007	Doctors	Kelly Madden	1 episode
2008	The Royal Today	Debbie Fitzgerald	1 episode
2008	Shameless	Bindy	1 episode
2009	Ashes to Ashes	Rachel Lessing	1 episode
2009	Monday Monday	Kelly	1 episode
2009	Coronation Street	Zoe Willson	7 episodes
2010–2012	Emmerdale	Roz Fielding	58 episodes
2012	Accused	Julie	1 episode
2013–present	Hollyoaks	Leela Lomax	Regular role, 520 episodes
2014	Common	Liaison Officer	1 episode
2020	Hollyoaks Later	Leela Lomax	2020 special
2023	Celebrity SAS: Who Dares Wins	Contestant	Channel 4

== Awards and nominations ==
Year	Award	Category	Result	Ref.
2014	TV Choice Awards	Best Soap Newcomer	Won	
2014	Inside Soap Awards	Best Newcomer	Shortlisted	
2018	TV Choice Awards	Best Soap Actress	Nominated	
