= Maxim Baldry =

English actor (born 1996)

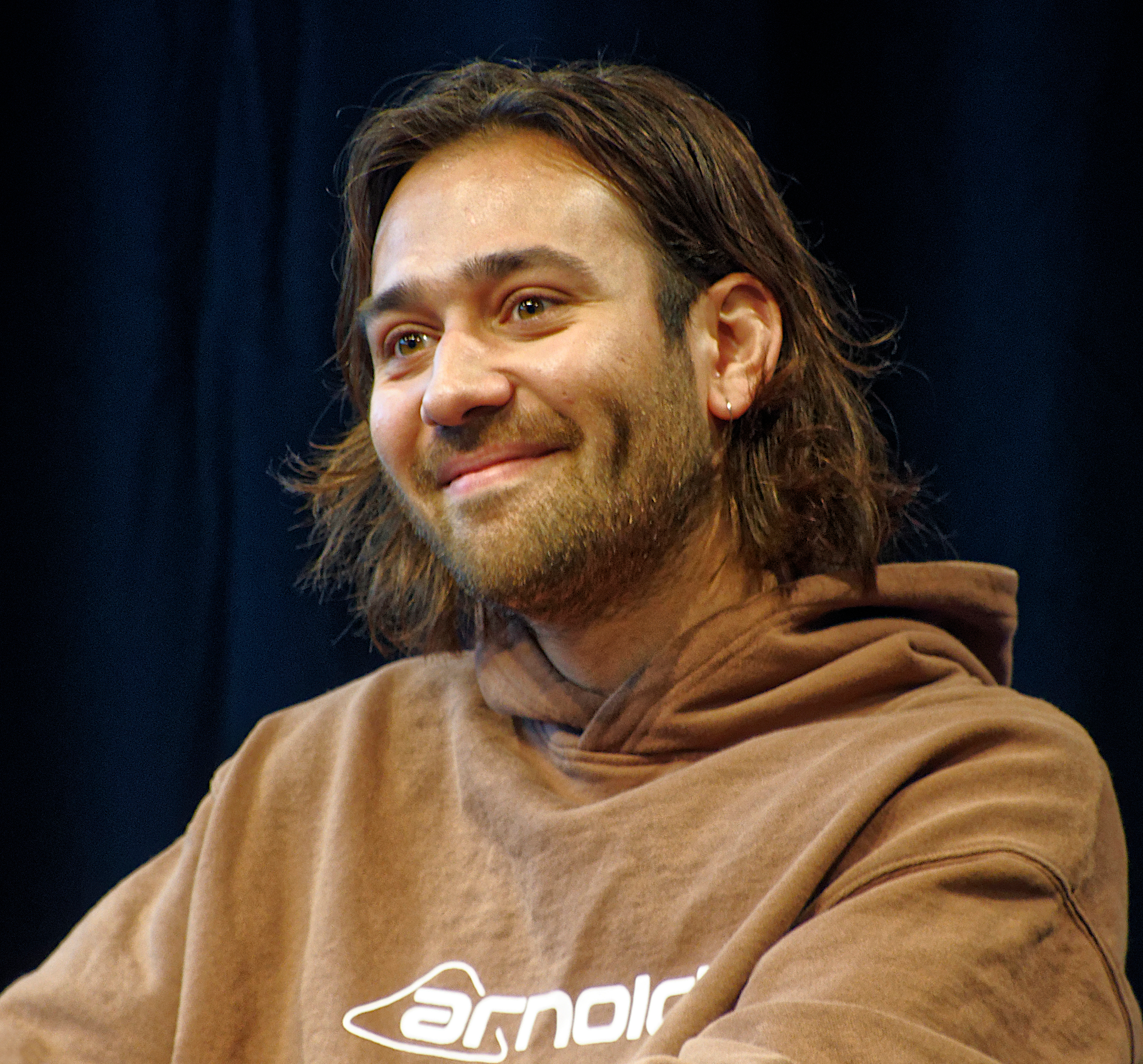
- Baldry at the 2022 Comic-Con Germany in Stuttgart
- Born: Maxim Alexander Baldry; 5 January 1996 (age 30); Redhill, Surrey, England
- Occupation: Actor
- Years active: 2005–present
- Notable work: Mr. Bean's Holiday; Hollyoaks; Years and Years; The Lord of the Rings: The Rings of Power

Maxim Alexander Baldry (born 5 January 1996) is an English film and television actor. He began his career as a child actor in the film Mr. Bean's Holiday (2007). More recently, he is known for his roles in the Channel 4 soap opera Hollyoaks (2016–2017) and miniseries Years and Years (2019), and the Amazon Prime fantasy series The Lord of the Rings: The Rings of Power (2022–present).

== Early life ==
Baldry was born in Redhill, Surrey to an English father from Leicestershire and a Russian-Armenian mother from Moscow; his parents met while his father was working in Eastern Europe. Baldry spent his early childhood in Moscow and Warsaw, and spoke Russian as his first language, before returning to England. He attended Hurtwood House, completing A-Levels in English, history, and theatre studies in 2014. He began his studies in literature at the University of Edinburgh, but withdrew.

== Career ==
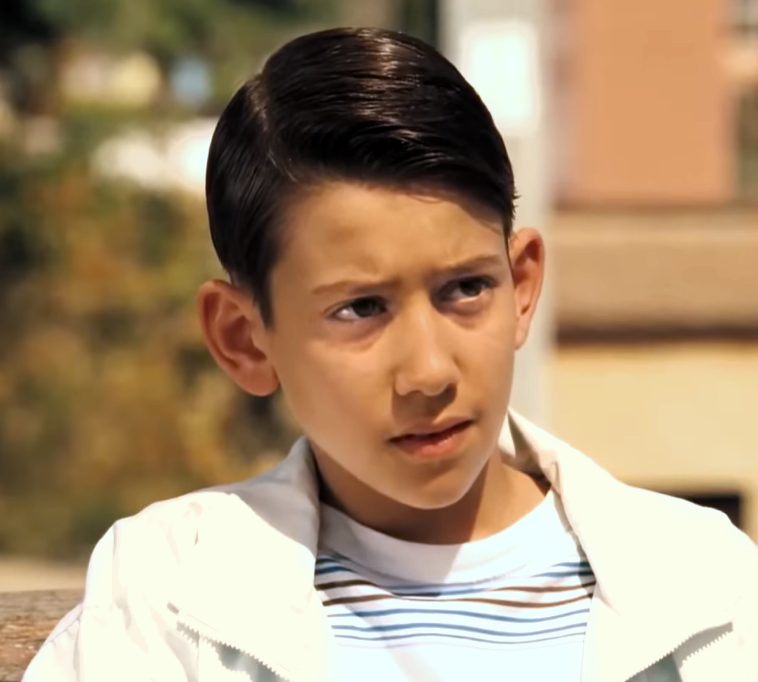
Maxim Baldry in Mr. Bean's Holiday (2007)

In 2007, Baldry starred as Stepan Duchevsky in the comedy film Mr. Bean's Holiday alongside Rowan Atkinson. He received a Young Artist Award nomination for his work in the film. Also in 2007, Baldry played Caesarion in the HBO historical drama Rome. He returned to acting nearly a decade later when he was cast as Liam Donovan in the Channel 4 soap opera, Hollyoaks; he played that role from 2016 to 2017. He then appeared in the Syfy television film Lake Placid: Legacy.

Baldry played Viktor Goraya in Russell T Davies' 2019 BBC One miniseries Years and Years and Ed in the film Last Christmas. The following year, he guest starred as John Polidori in the Doctor Who series 12 episode "The Haunting of Villa Diodati" and appeared in Strike Back: Vendetta on Sky One. After circling a role in The Lord of the Rings: The Rings of Power for several months, he was confirmed to have joined the ensemble cast in December 2020. The series premiered in 2022, with Baldry playing Isildur.

== Filmography ==
Year	Title	Role	Notes
2005	The Little Polar Bear 2: The Mysterious Island	Chucho	English dub
2007	Rome	Caesarion	3 episodes
2007	Mr. Bean's Holiday	Stepan Dachevsky	
2016–2017	Hollyoaks	Liam Donovan	Series regular (80 episodes)
2018	Lake Placid: Legacy	Dane	Television film
2019	Years and Years	Viktor Goraya	6 episodes
2019	Last Christmas	Ed	
2020	Doctor Who	John Polidori	Episode: "The Haunting of Villa Diodati"
2020	Strike Back: Vendetta	Loric Demachi	4 episodes
2022–present	The Lord of the Rings: The Rings of Power	Isildur	8 episodes

== Awards and nominations ==
Year	Award	Category	Work	Result	Ref.
2008	Young Artist Awards	Best Supporting Young Actor in a Feature Film – Comedy or Musical	Mr. Bean's Holiday	Nominated	
