= Diego Salvador Martinez Hernandez De La Cruz =

UK soap opera character, created 2015

- Hollyoaks character
- Portrayed by: Juan Pablo Yepez
- Duration: 2015–2017
- First appearance: 16 November 2015
- Last appearance: 8 March 2017
- Introduced by: Bryan Kirkwood
In-universe information
- Occupation: Barman
- Mother: Juanita Salvador Martinez Hernandez De La Cruz
- Wife: Maria (until 2016)
- Daughters: Carmina McQueen

Diego Salvador Martinez Hernandez De La Cruz is a fictional character from the British Channel 4 soap opera Hollyoaks, played by Juan Pablo Yepez. The character made his first on-screen appearance on 16 November 2015. Diego was introduced as a new love interest of established character Myra McQueen (Nicole Barber-Lane) following a chance meeting in Alicante, Spain. Yepez auditioned for the role then met with Barber-Lane and after a successful screen test was offered the part. It was his first regular British television role after moving to the country from Venezuela. The character's first scenes proved controversial due to his ownership of a Confederate flag at a time it was deemed socially unacceptable. Diego is also a Venezuelan national and he is characterised as a romantic person, with honest values and a fresh outlook on life. He also has a cheeky and charming personality.

He follows Myra to Hollyoaks village under the impression she is a countess. But despite learning she deceived him the pair resume their relationship. Yepez has explained that his character just tends to follow his heart. His main storyline has focused on his romance with Myra and his desire to start a family with her. The character has proved popular with some critics of the genre, mostly due to the character being deemed aesthetically pleasing. Following the end of his relationship with Myra, Diego departed on 8 March 2017.

== Casting ==
The character and Yepez's casting were announced on 4 October 2015 via an interview with actress Nicole Barber-Lane published by Digital Spy. Barber-Lane revealed that Yepez had joined the cast to play the new boyfriend of her character Myra McQueen. Yepez met with Barber-Lane during the audition process. Yepez has recalled that he was excited when Hollyoaks invited him to complete a screen test for the role. Yepez stated "I didn't know much about Hollyoaks at all so I had to do a crash course. I spent two weeks reading about it and watching online." It was his first regular television work in the United Kingdom after moving from Venezuela. He had previously appeared in one episode of rival soap opera Coronation Street.

== Development ==
=== Characterisation and introduction ===
"This red-blooded Latin lover is cheeky, charming, bursting with energy... and the last man you’d expect to find on the arm of Myra McQueen! [...] With a heart bigger than his surname, Diego is a hopeless romantic who lives for the moment and has more passion than a Pasadoble. [...] But don’t be fooled by his cheeky charm, there’s more to this Venezuelan dreamboat than meets the eye."

Diego is a Venezuelan character and Yepez also shares his nationality. He is characterised as a romantic, has a very accepting nature and is played as a charming man with a cheeky personality. Yepez told Kilkelly (Digital Spy) that Diego is "a dreamer, he's adventurous and he's a free spirit. He's quite fun, he's transparent and there's no barriers or games being played." The actor has also called Diego "an exotic character" who is fun-loving, big-hearted and full of passion. Yepez told Claire Crick from All About Soap that Diego has a "very fresh outlook" on life. He also believed his character was honest, adding "there are no barriers with him. What you see is what you get when it comes to Diego."

The character's first scenes caused controversy with viewers because of decor on his camper van. A Confederate flag was displayed on his van while conversing with fellow character Holly Cunningham (Amanda Clapham). This came at a time some residents of the United States were condemning modern display of the flag. Viewers took to social media to express their outrage that Hollyoaks had displayed the divisive symbol. A spokesperson from the show apologised stating "We apologise for any offence caused to our audience, due to this oversight. The flag has been removed from any future episodes."

=== Relationship with Myra McQueen ===
"Myra feels a real magic with Diego, and he's brought her to life. It's a fun and passionate relationship."

— Barber-Lane on Diego and Myra's relationship. (2015)

Diego and Myra had met while in the Spanish resort of Alicante. Diego arrives in Hollyoaks village in search of Myra and is under the impression Myra is the "Countess of Chester" following Myra lying to him. She lied because she feared Diego would not be interested in her if she was not wealthy. Barber-Lane told Daniel Kilkelly from Digital Spy that "She's living that fantasy out and she doesn't want that to come crashing down, so she doesn't actually want Diego to follow her to Chester at first." Yepez stated that Diego comes to Hollyoaks with no money but determined to make a new life and keep Myra in his life. Myra felt that pretending to be a countess would keep Diego while in Spain. When the truth comes out in the village, she just has to trust that he will stay with her. Barber-Lane revealed that her scenes with Yepez would add fun to the McQueen family at a time they were playing out dark storylines. Producer Bryan Kirkwood had planned to use their relationship to reintroduce some light fun and excitement back into Hollyoaks. Though Barber-Lane warned "Myra and Diego will have wicked highs but some lows too. There will be a rollercoaster ride – so expect anything!"

Myra's son John Paul McQueen (James Sutton) is suspicious of Diego's intentions towards her. Myra is also much older than Diego, but Barber-Lane told Kilkelly that she believes Diego and Myra are one hundred percent in love and "there was an immediate chemistry when they met in a bar in Spain." Myra tries to hold onto her new-found youth and she believed that Diego had rejuvenated her character into a changed woman. The actress added that viewers would learn much more about Diego's past and that would ultimately decide whether his and Myra's relationship can survive. Myra soon suspects that Diego is being unfaithful when she finds a photograph of him with another woman. She hears him call Maria and expresses his love. Myra confronts Diego but is shocked when he reveals that Maria is his sister. Writer's played a story to test the character's relationship in January 2016. Diego starts working for the Nightingale family at "The Dog in the Pond" pub. Myra offers to give Nathan Nightingale (Jared Garfield) Spanish lessons despite not knowing the language. Diego had refused to learn Nathan the language and Myra is desperate to hide her scam from Diego because he is so honest. Nathan's sister Ellie Nightingale (Sophie Porley) tries to convince Diego that Myra and Nathan are having an affair. He refuses to believe her, but her scheming has the desired outcome when Diego misinterprets an interaction between Myra and Nathan as being an affair. Diego later witnesses Nathan showing Myra underwear he has purchased for his girlfriend Rachel Hardy (Jennifer Brooke). He informs Rachel that their partners are cheating on them and tries to leave the village. Myra then has to convince Diego that she has not been unfaithful.

Writers later began to embed the character amongst the McQueen family and interacting more with John Paul. The storyline begins when John Paul becomes annoyed with Diego and Myra's intimacy around the house. He opines that their relationship is merely about sex and orders them to refrain from being intimate for a day. Diego obliges to prove that their relationship is credible. The incident subsequently brings Diego to the decision that he wants to father a child with Myra. This shocks John Paul who begins to develop feelings for him. Yepez believed that John Paul was only disappointed with Diego because of jealousy. He added that Diego "reaches out to him and they establish more of a friendship."

=== Family planning ===
Producers explored the story of Diego's want for a child in March 2016. When Diego informs Myra he wants to start a family of their own she is horrified. Diego does not realise Myra's actual age because she has been dishonest. Yepez told Sarah Ellis from Inside Soap that it is "normal progression" for Diego as he views their relationship as being stable. Diego wants Myra to know that he is committed, "having a baby ties you together long term, and he wants that emotional stability." He believed Diego's naivety about Myra's age came from their healthy sex life. But Diego ultimately believes that age does not matter because he and Myra are in love.

Diego becomes suspicious of Myra's actual age when he looks through old photo albums. Believing she is 38 he is confused about dates and concerned when she lies about her whereabouts. Barber-Lane told Ellis that Myra is closer to 50 and unsure if she still can get pregnant. Myra viewed Diego as "young and hot" and decided to pretend she was ten years younger to gain his interest. Myra feels younger with Diego but the reality is that she is older. The actress explained that "she feels guilty that she may not be able to give him what he wants. She'd love to have a baby with him – she just doesn't think she can." Diego's worries about Myra's age are sidelined when she falls over and he finds her visiting the hospital. He assumes that she must be pregnant. In June 2016, episodes featured Mrya hospitalised following a fall down some stairs. She is then informed that she is pregnant and Diego is delighted that his dream of starting a family with Myra has become reality.

=== Introduction of family ===
In July 2016, Kilkelly (Digital Spy) reported that Fernanda Dinez had been cast as Diego's sister Maria. He revealed that Maria would be unwelcome in the McQueen household when Mercedes McQueen (Jennifer Metcalfe) learns she is involved in drug trafficking. Her presence causes conflict with Mercedes which effects Myra's health. She is taken to hospital with stomach pains fearing for her unborn child's life. Mercedes also becomes directly involved in Maria's crimes trying to help Diego. The show managed to keep a secret storyline involving Diego and Maria concealed until a revelation episode was broadcast. When Diego and Mercedes force Maria to leave Hollyoaks village, Maria reveals that Diego has been lying and she is his ex-wife rather than his sister. Writers also used Diego and Maria's scenes to imply that the character is hiding more secrets.

Jacey Sallés was then cast as Diego's mother Juanita Salvador Martinez Hernandez De La Cruz. The character was billed as glamorous, wealthy and has the best intentions for her son. A publicist from Hollyoaks told Amy Duncan from Metro that Juanita had "very high hopes" for Diego and even made monetary promises if she approved of his choice of partner. They revealed that in Diego's backstory Diego and Juanita became estranged following his divorce from Maria. Her "hopes were utterly dashed" and she refused to give Diego money and ceased contact with him. They added that Diego has a "complicated family history" and Myra would support a reconciliation between Diego and Juanita.

=== Departure ===
On 8 March 2017, the character made "a shock exit" when he left the village, following the end of his relationship with Myra. Daniel Kilkelly of Digital Spy confirmed that Yepez had left the cast. Diego's final storyline saw him attempt to scam Frankie Osborne (Helen Pearson). When Myra learns the truth, she decides to "turn a blind eye" and move to Spain with him and their young daughter. However, when Frankie confesses that she and Diego also had sex, Myra breaks up with him and Diego leaves without a fight.

== Reception ==
Laura-Jayne Tyler from Inside Soap said that Diego was her team's new favourite hunk. She added that she would not miss an episode of the show because of Diego. A Soaplife writer predicted that all of the McQueen family would find themselves vulnerable to succumbing to "toyboy" Diego's good looks. A writer from BT TV believed that Diego "causes a stir" on Hollyoaks. Ben Kelly from gay lifestyle Attitude branded Diego "handsome" and stated that the company's staff were keeping a "a very close eye on proceedings" between Diego and John Paul. Sarah Ellis (Inside Soap) said "call us cynics, but when Myra first returned with toy boy Diego, we couldn't help being suspicious. But after the handsome foreigner weathered the revelation that his lover wasn't actually a countess – bless him for believing! – he certainly proved us wrong." Daniel Kilkelly from Digital Spy put the inclusion of a Confederate flag during Diego's introduction on his list of 11 "blunders" in soap operas, writing, "It's important to give brand new soap characters memorable entrance scenes, but Hollyoaks took that a little bit too far with the introduction of Myra McQueen's toyboy lover Diego".
