= Brodie family =

Fictional family from River City

The core Brodie family (left to right: Adeeb, Leyla, Conor, Michael, Nicole)

The Brodie family are a fictional family from the soap opera River City that appeared on-screen from 2010 onwards.

== Creation ==
On 1 September 2010, ATV News Network announced that a new mixed-race family would join River City. The family were collectively introduced by the show’s executive producer Gaynor Holmes, and debuted on-screen throughout October and November. The family consists of patriarch Michael Brodie (Andy Clark); his son and daughter, Conor (Rian John Gordon) and Nicole (Holly Jack); his wife Leyla (Maryam Hamidi); her son Adeeb (Taryam Boyd); and Michael’s brothers Gabriel (Garry Sweeney) and Leo (Nick Rhys). Speaking of the family, Holmes stated: "We're absolutely delighted to be welcoming Andy Clark, Garry Sweeney, Nick Rhys and Maryam Hamidi to River City. They're certainly going to shake things up in Shieldinch with some exciting upcoming stories. It is a real testament to the show’s popularity that it continues to attract such strong acting talent."

== Gabriel Brodie ==
Gabriel Brodie
- River City character
- Portrayed by: Garry Sweeney
- Duration: 2010–2019, 2021–2022
- First appearance: 5 October 2010
- Last appearance: 26 September 2022
- Introduced by: Gaynor Holmes
In-universe information
- Occupation: Shopkeeper
- Brothers: Michael Brodie; Leo Brodie
- Nephews: Conor Brodie; Adeeb Brodie (adoptive)
- Nieces: Nicole Brodie

Gabriel Brodie, played by Garry Sweeney, is Michael and Leo's brother. He made his first on-screen appearance on 5 October 2010. Sweeney spoke on his casting: "It’s a joy to be part of the cast and to play such a larger-than-life character like Gabriel. He is so much fun to play – always ducking and diving – but also seems to have a real heart of gold."

Gabriel arrives in Shieldinch and breaks into 11 Montego Street to leave a post-it note in the fridge with "found you" written on it. Later, he sets up a stall outside Versus, annoying prospective tenant Fraser Crozier (Neil McNulty). He breaks into the premises to move his stock in and calls the letting agents. Gabriel later asks Stella Walker (Keira Lucchesi) to lock herself in so he can meet with the estate agent. When he meets the agent, the agent refuses to let him on the premises. After another disagreement, Fraser calls the police and reports Gabriel for selling stolen goods, but when the police search, they find Fraser's goods have already been reported as stolen and Gabriel's are legitimate.

Gabriel gives the agent the deposit for Versus. He officially departed in late 2015 before returning for Malcolm Hamilton's funeral in March 2016. He left in April but returned again in the summer to help Stevie Burns, before remaining as a regular in July as Kelly Marie-Adams (Carmen Pieraccini) announces she is pregnant with his child. Gabriel is attacked by Alex Murdoch (Mark Rowley), but survives. In 2019, Gabriel dies after being shot by Dougie Patterson (Stewart Porter). Years later, Gabriel returns as an angel after Stevie O'Hara (Iain Robertson) attempts to kill himself. Gabriel returned yet again in a Multiverse dream shared between Bob and Angus where he is married to Eileen.

== Michael Brodie ==
Michael Brodie
- River City character
- Portrayed by: Andy Clark
- Duration: 2010–2012
- First appearance: 5 October 2010
- Last appearance: 16 October 2012
- Introduced by: Gaynor Holmes
In-universe information
- Occupation: General practitioner (until 2012)
- Brothers: Gabriel Brodie; Leo Brodie
- Wife: Chloe Brodie; Leyla Brodie
- Sons: Conor Brodie
- Daughters: Nicole Brodie
- Stepsons: Adeeb Brodie
- Granddaughters: Grace

Michael "Mike" Brodie, played by Andy Clark, is Leyla's husband and Conor and Nicole's father. He made his first on-screen appearance on 5 October 2010, and becomes the soap's resident general practitioner. The character's profile on the official River City website describes him as "uptight and regimented". Clark spoke on his casting, "I'm delighted to be joining the cast of River City. It's great to be playing a good guy for once, as I’ve played a lot of baddies in my time. Michael is a real family guy, and it'll be interesting to see how his character develops."

Michael arrives in Shieldinch and inspects 11 Montego Street, which he bought. He tells Gabriel that he does not want any trouble as the family is making a fresh start, and returns home to pack up the rest of the family's belongings. Michael receives a phone call from his ex-wife Chloe and goes to see her; she tells him that she is moving to Canada and that Conor and Nicole will have to stay with him. Michael later learns that Nicole has been seeing Charlie Bowie, and he angrily confronts him before Nicole admits that Charlie refuses to see her after he discovered her age. Michael diagnoses Scarlett Mullen with ovarian cancer. When Scarlett does not tell her family, Michael drops her medical records on the surgical theatre's floor and asks her mother, Molly O'Hara, to clean it. Molly finds the medical records and reads them. Michael helps Scarlett when she becomes ill and goes to the hospital with her.

== Leyla Brodie ==
Leyla Brodie
- River City character
- Portrayed by: Maryam Hamidi
- Duration: 2010–2014
- First appearance: 12 October 2010
- Last appearance: 13 May 2014
- Introduced by: Gaynor Holmes
In-universe information
- Occupation: Receptionist
- Husband: Michael Brodie
- Sons: Adeeb Brodie
- Stepsons: Conor Brodie
- Stepdaughters: Nicole Brodie

Leyla Brodie, played by Maryam Hamidi, is Michael's wife and Adeeb's mother. She made her first on-screen appearance on 12 October 2010. ATV describes her as a "modern Muslim", and has also been described as "pushy". When asked about her casting, Hamidi said, "Family set-ups are never that simple in our society and hopefully the journey our new family is going on will be one a lot of modern and multi-cultural families can relate to. I really enjoy the verve and spirit of River City, but hope the Brodies are going to offer Shieldinch a little class and sophistication."

Leyla arrives in Shieldinch with Michael and Adeeb. She tells Michael she is fine with leaving university to become his receptionist at the Health Centre. Leyla clashes with Molly when she mistakes her for a doctor and explains she does not have a problem with her ethnic background. She is horrified to see Gabriel and tells Michael that he is dependent on him. Leyla struggles to work at the clinic and drops a pile of patients' files on the floor. Whilst picking them up, she misses the note which nurse Ruth Carroll had written in regards to flu injection-related allergies. When Mr. Stewart, a patient, falls ill from the injection, Ruth’s professionalism is questioned and she is sent home by Michael. Leyla finds the note on the floor but hides it. When Ruth and Leyla help Grayson who has collapsed in the street, Ruth panics as she is trying to help him. She tells Leyla she is worried she will make another mistake, but Leyla tells her that Mr. Stewart's collapsing was not her fault. Ruth asks Leyla why the incident was not her fault and Leyla admits that she found the note from the file, but did not tell Michael. She also tells Michael that the incident was not Ruth's fault.

== Adeeb Brodie ==
Adeeb Brodie
- River City character
- Portrayed by: Taryam Boyd
- Duration: 2010–2013
- First appearance: 12 October 2010
- Last appearance: 11 June 2013
- Introduced by: Gaynor Holmes
In-universe information
- Occupation: Student
- Mother: Leyla Brodie
- Stepfather: Michael Brodie

Adeeb Brodie, played by Taryam Boyd, is Leyla's son. He made his first on-screen appearance on 12 October 2010. ATV describes him as an "intelligent kid" who takes his biological father's Iraqi heritage seriously.

Adeeb arrives in Shieldinch with Leyla and Michael. When he spends more time on his laptop, Leyla assumes that he is watching pornography. Adeeb explains to Michael that he wants to move to Iraq because he feels he does not belong in Scotland. Michael tells Leyla and she agrees to take Adeeb to Iraq for a holiday.

== Nicole Brodie ==
Nicole Brodie
- River City character
- Portrayed by: Holly Jack
- Duration: 2010–2014, 2018–2024, 2026
- First appearance: 12 October 2010
- Introduced by: Gaynor Holmes
In-universe information
- Occupation: Student
- Father: Michael Brodie
- Mother: Chloe Brodie
- Stepmother: Leyla Brodie
- Brothers: Conor Brodie
- Daughters: Grace Brodie
- Uncles: Gabriel Brodie; Leo Brodie

Nicole Brodie, played by Holly Jack, Michael's daughter and Conor's sister. She made her first on-screen appearance on 12 October 2010. ATV describes her as "14 going on 40". Speaking of her casting, Jack said, "I think they [her parents] were happier than me when I got the part. My mum was screaming down the phone. I think she nearly had a heart attack."

Nicole is shopping at the Hola boutique where she meets Charlie, who thinks she is older than she really is. She flirts with him and gives him her phone number. She later truants from school and visits Charlie, arranging a date with him, before telling Michael she feels too ill to go to school. When Nicole kisses Charlie, Annie Sobacz stops her and tells Charlie that Nicole is a schoolgirl. Nicole turns up at Charlie’s flat and he tells her that he knows she is still at school. She tells Charlie that they can have a secret relationship and that age is not important. After Michael asks her if she is in a relationship with someone, Nicole tells him that she was seeing Charlie. Michael angrily confronts Charlie, thinking he is a pervert, but Charlie tells him he thought Nicole was a college student. When Michael asks for the truth, Nicole admits that Charlie refused to see her after he discovered her age.

Nicole then falls for schoolmate Sean, but her friend Carmen also likes him. When Nicole embarrasses Carmen in front of Sean, Carmen bullies her. Vulnerable, frightened and lonely, Nicole turns to Councillor Nick Morrison for emotional support. Her affection for Nick begins to grow and turns to love after he saves her from a physical attack at the hands of the school bullies. Mistaking his gentle care for requited feelings of love, Nicole tries to kiss Nick and he pushes her away. Michael and Layla eventually find out about the two of them and become angry, which pushes Nicole further away from the family, annoyed that her father still treats her like a child and disapproving of any boy she intends on seeing. Eventually, Nicole finds out about her stepmother's affair with her uncle Gabriel, and she runs away. She joins a bad crowd with a guy named Cammie, who lures and grooms her to sell to wealthy clients, and threatens and blackmail her friend Christina. Nicole is helped by one of Cammie's girls, who advises her to get out. Nicole escapes and makes her way home. She tells Michael the truth about why she ran away, which prompts Michael to have an argument with Leyla and disown Gabriel. In 2013, Nicole gives birth to a daughter called Grace. She struggles to be a young single mum and considers putting her child up for adoption when she gets a place in a college in Aberdeen. When Grace develops meningitis, Nicole takes her when she leaves Shieldinch.

== Conor Brodie ==
Conor Brodie
- River City character
- Portrayed by: Rian Gordon
- Duration: 2010–2013, 2024–2026
- First appearance: 12 October 2010
- Introduced by: Gaynor Holmes
In-universe information
- Occupation: Student
- Father: Michael Brodie
- Mother: Chloe Brodie
- Stepmother: Leyla Brodie
- Sisters: Nicole Brodie
- Uncles: Gabriel Brodie; Leo Brodie
- Nieces: Grace

Conor Brodie, played by Rian John Gordon, is Michael's son and Nicole's brother. He made his first on-screen appearance on 12 October 2010. ATV describes him as a "typical teenage boy".

Conor arrives in Shieldinch with Nicole. After Leo asks Conor if Leyla had something to do with Michael quitting the army, he questions Michael asking him why he never talks about his former job. Conor shows Leo Michael's cadet uniform, but Michael sees and asks him if he had permission. Conor tells Michael that he forged his signature on the consent form. Michael disapproves, and tells Conor he is not joining cadets, but Leo says that he is proud of him.

== Leo Brodie ==
Leo Brodie
- River City character
- Portrayed by: Nick Rhys
- Duration: 2010–2011
- First appearance: 2 November 2010
- Last appearance: 30 August 2011
- Introduced by: Gaynor Holmes
In-universe information
- Occupation: Soldier
- Brothers: Gabriel Brodie; Michael Brodie
- Nephews: Conor Brodie; Adeeb Brodie
- Nieces: Nicole Brodie

Leo Brodie, played by Nick Rhys, is Michael and Gabriel's younger brother. He made his first on-screen appearance on 2 November 2010. ATV describes him as "young man about the town". Rhys said in regards to his casting, "Being a young man about the town, there will definitely be someone Leo takes a shine to, who that may be you will have to wait and see." Rhys later commented that Leo was not a one-dimensional character, calling him "complicated".

Leo arrives in Shieldinch and meets Hayley McCrone (Pamela Byrne) and overhears that she will not wear a Remembrance Day poppy because she does not want to put a hole in her cardigan. He asks her if it matters and she tells him that handing over her money is the main issue before walking away. Leo later asks Conor if he thinks whether Leyla had something to do with Michael quitting the army. Before Leo returns to Afghanistan, Hayley kisses him, but she pulls away admitting it was wrong. Michael receives a phone call from the army, who tell him that Leo has been injured.

== Chloe Brodie ==
Chloe Brodie
- River City character
- Portrayed by: Shonagh Price
- Duration: 2013
- Introduced by: Gaynor Holmes
In-universe information
- Husband: Michael Brodie (backstory)
- Sons: Conor Brodie
- Daughters: Nicole Brodie

Chloe Brodie, played by Shonagh Price, is Michael's first wife and the mother of Conor and Nicole.

== Reception ==
Andrea Mullaney of The Scotsman said that it was a "strange novelty" to see the Brodie family move into an empty house with their belongings, rather than using the previous inhabitants' belongings. She commented: "[I]t was actually mildly refreshing to see the new family in River City walk around their new, empty house, pondering where to put their belongings when the removal van got there."
