= Malique Thompson-Dwyer =

English actor

- Born: 2 February 1998 (age 28); Hollinwood, Greater Manchester, England
- Occupation: Actor
- Years active: 2015–present
- Television: Hollyoaks; I'm a Celebrity...Get Me Out of Here!; Celebs Go Dating; Celeb Ex in the City; Celebs on the Farm
- Children: 2

Malique Thompson-Dwyer (born 2 February 1998) is an English actor, known for playing Prince McQueen in the Channel 4 soap opera Hollyoaks from 2016 to 2019 and 2021 onwards.

== Career ==
Thompson-Dwyer's first on-screen acting role was as Tommo in the CBBC children's drama The Dumping Ground. In 2016, he joined the Channel 4 soap opera Hollyoaks as Prince McQueen, the son of Goldie McQueen (Chelsee Healey) and the twin brother of Hunter McQueen (Theo Graham). His first appearance was in the episode shown on 17 November 2016. For his work in Hollyoaks, Thompson-Dwyer won "Best Partnership" at the British Soap Awards 2018, alongside Theo Graham. In 2019, Thompson-Dwyer departed from the cast of Hollyoaks. It was confirmed in Summer 2021 that he will return with his return airing in September 2021.

In 2017, Thompson-Dwyer appeared as young Wet Stick in the film King Arthur: Legend of the Sword. In November 2018, it was announced that he would compete in the eighteenth series of I'm a Celebrity...Get Me Out of Here!. Aged 20 at the time of participating, he is the youngest contestant to appear on the show, and was the second to be eliminated on 2 December 2018. In 2020, he appeared in the eighth series of Celebs Go Dating and in December in Celeb Ex in the City. The following year, he competed on the MTV series Celebs on the Farm.

== Personal life ==
Thompson-Dwyer has two daughters born in 2017 and 2022.
