= Holly Jack =

Scottish actress

- Born: 1989 or 1990 (age 36–37); Airdrie, North Lanarkshire, Scotland
- Occupations: Actress; acting coach
- Known for: River City; Waterloo Road; Burnistoun’s Big Night Out

Holly Jack is a Scottish actress and acting coach. She is known for her role as Nicole Brodie in the BBC Scotland soap opera River City, in which she joined as a series regular in October 2010. After appearing in the soap for four years, she quit and began working as an acting coach. She also appeared in Waterloo Road as Bonnie Kincaid in 2015. Then, four years after leaving River City, she returned in 2018.

== Career ==
In 2010, Jack was cast in the BBC Scotland soap opera River City as Nicole Brodie. She made her first on-screen appearance on 12 October 2010. ATV described her as "14 going on 40". Speaking of her casting, Jack said, "I think they [her parents] were happier than me when I got the part. My mum was screaming down the phone. I think she nearly had a heart attack." She quit the role in 2014, saying that she had learned all she could from the character. Of her last storyline on the show, she told The Sunday Post that it "left her shattered".

Shortly after she quit River City, she was hired as an acting coach. In 2014, she appeared in Footballers United. On 1 July 2014, it was announced that Jack would be joining the cast of Waterloo Road as a new student at the beginning of the second half of the tenth series in early 2015, which would also be the last series of the show. Jack returned to River City in 2018 as Nicole. In 2019, Jack played the role of Cinderella in the pantomime production of Cinderella at the Pavilion Theatre in Glasgow.

== Filmography ==
Year	Title	Role	Ref(s)
2010−2014, 2018–2024, 2026	River City	Nicole Brodie	
2014	Footballers United	Jessie	
2015	Waterloo Road	Bonnie Kincaid	
2015	Burnistoun's Big Night	Various roles	

== Stage ==
Year	Title	Role	Venue	Ref(s)
2019	Cinderella	Cinderella	Pavilion Theatre, Glasgow	
