= Jacey Sallés =

British actress

Jacey Salles
- Education: Rose Bruford College; London Metropolitan University
- Occupation: Actress
- Years active: 1991–present
- Television: Cold Feet; Casualty
- Children: 1

Jacey Sallés is a British actress. She is known for her role as Ramona Ramirez in the ITV drama Cold Feet (1998–2003) and its revival (2016–2019). In 2019, she began appearing in the soap opera Casualty as Rosa Cadenas.

== Early life and education ==
Sallés is the daughter of an English interior designer and a Spanish entrepreneur from Barcelona. She spent her early childhood in Ibiza. She attended Parliament Hill School.

Sallés graduated from Rose Bruford College with a Bachelor of Arts in Theatre Studies. She later obtained a PGCE from London Metropolitan University in 2009, which she used to teach at Highbury Grove School.

== Career ==
Sallés rose to fame playing Ramona Ramirez, the Marsden family's "fiery Spanish nanny", in the ITV drama Cold Feet between 1997 and 2003. She reprised the role for the revived series in 2016. In August 2016, it was announced that Sallés had been cast in a guest role on Hollyoaks, portraying "glamorous and feisty" Juanita Salvador Martinez Hernandez De La Cruz, the mother of established character Diego Salvador Martinez Hernandez De La Cruz (Juan Pablo Yepez). She appeared in six episodes, originally broadcast in September 2016.

In May 2019, it was announced that Sallés would join the cast of the BBC One medical drama Casualty as hospital porter Rosa Cadenas, who would be part of an "interesting story" with established character David Hide (Jason Durr). Sallés has also appeared in the 2011 film Attack the Block and the 1998 romantic comedy The Misadventures of Margaret. Additionally, she has appeared in small roles in Keith Lemon: Coming in America, Doctors, Holby City and My Family.

== Personal life ==
Sallés has a daughter.

== Filmography ==
Year	Title	Role	Notes
1991	Murder Most Horrid	Silvia	
1992	Birds of a Feather	Jacinthe	
1994	The Knock	Air Stewardess	
1995	An Independent Man	Yvonne	
1997	The Detectives	Bride	
1998	The Misadventures of Margaret	Frannie	Film
1998–2003, 2016–2019	Cold Feet	Ramona Ramirez	Supporting role, 32 episodes
2000	Lock, Stock...	Sylvia Harmless	
2002	Holby City	Daniella Canas	
2002	Doctors	Sheila Roberts	
2003	My Family	Maria	
2003	Loose Women	Herself	Panellist
2003	Cold Feet: The Final Call	Herself	
2003	Russian Roulette	Herself	
2008	Doctors	Lydia Blake	
2011	Attack the Block	Biggz's Mum	Film
2016	Hollyoaks	Juanita Salvador Martinez Hernandez De La Cruz	Guest role; 6 episodes
2019–2022	Casualty	Rosa Cadenas	Series regular
