= Kerry Bennett =

British actress

- Born: United Kingdom
- Occupation: Actress
- Years active: 2010–present

Kerry Bennett is a British television and theatre actress. Bennett grew up in Stockport, England, and began her career aged fourteen acting in theatre productions. She rose to prominence playing the role of Jess Cranham in the BBC medical drama Casualty and Eva Falco in the soap opera Hollyoaks. Bennett has also appeared in numerous other British television dramas, soap operas and short films. Bennett has also participated in voice over work and continued to pursue her theatrical career when not signed to television or film roles.

== Career ==
Bennett was born in United Kingdom and grew up in the northern town Stockport. Bennett is biracial and has Seychellois heritage. At age fourteen, Bennett joined the NK Theatre company and began playing roles in their productions. Bennett's first professional role was dancing in the NSPCC charity gala at The Palace Theatre in Manchester. Bennett then participated in various "theatre in education" programmes and later became a patron of the theatre's charity. She furthered her training by attending the East 15 Acting School in Essex. In addition to acting, Bennett has become a voice over artist during her career.

In 2014, Bennett secured a guest role in CBBC show Hank Zipzer. In 2015, it was revealed that Bennett was filming a role for the horror genre web-series titled, The Highridge Massacre. Bennett played the role of Jess Cranham in the BBC medical drama Casualty. The character is portrayed as a paramedic on the series. Jess is also a lesbian who becomes the victim of domestic violence. She made her finale appearance in the episode broadcast on 20 January 2016.

In 2016, Bennett had a role in the British-Italian indie film The Habit of Beauty. She also returned to theatre from April to June 2016, playing the role of Dawn in the touring stage production of Invincible. It was later announced that Bennett had joined the cast of the Channel 4 soap opera Hollyoaks, playing the role of Eva Falco. The role was described as deadly character who was fixated on getting revenge. Whilst working on Hollyoaks, Bennett worked with Clive Russell who played her on-screen father Billy Brodie. Bennett described the experience as "quite daunting" but was "thrilled" to work alongside the actor. Bennett remained with the show for six months until her character was killed off and her final scenes were broadcast on 16 January 2017. Discussing her exit, Bennett stated she had an "amazing time", a "great storyline" and was "sad" to leave the cast.

Bennett then secured a role in the ITV soap opera Coronation Street, playing Trina Robson. It was reported that Bennett had only filmed the role for a small number of episodes. In 2018, Bennett appeared in the short film Neon, in the main role of Mary alongside Joe Absolom. She also appeared in the Sky One drama series Bulletproof, playing Scarlett Nugent. She also played the role of Jessica Markhamp in an episode of the ITV drama Butterfly, which was broadcast on 28 October 2018. On 4 February 2019, Bennett appeared as Lauren Crighton in an episode of the BBC soap opera, Doctors. She also appeared in the film We Die Young, which starred Jean-Claude Van Damme. From May to August 2019, Bennett appeared in the West End theatre production of The Starry Messenger.

In 2021, Bennett appeared as Cori Atkins in the film Off Your Head. In 2022, Bennett returned to theatre work playing Alex in stage production of Home I'm Darling, written by Laura Wade. Also in 2022, Bennett appeared in the Viaplay show Threesome as Joanna Alexander.

== Filmography ==
=== Film ===
Year	Title	Role	Notes
2010	The Last Man	Alex	
2013	My Kin	Ally	Short films
2014	It's a Riot	Radio News Reporter (voice)	Short films
2014	Bait	Pauline	
2015	The Session	Harper	Short films
2015	Everyday Stories of Colossal Importance	Sophia	Short films
2015	Delirium	Mother	Short films
2016	The Habit of Beauty	Elisabeth	
2018	Neon	Mary	Short film
2019	We Die Young	Brenda	
2021	Off Your Head	Cori Atkins	Short films
2023	I Know a Place	Nicki	Short films

=== Television ===
Year	Title	Role	Notes
2014	Hank Zipzer	Mother Customer	Guest role; episode: "Who Ordered the Baby?"
2015	Monster Hunters	Donna Matthews	Television film
2015–2016	Casualty	Jess Cranham	Recurring role; 6 episodes (series 30)
2016	The Tunnel	Check-In Attendant	Guest role; episode: #2.1
2016–2017	Hollyoaks	Eva Falco	Regular role; 25 episodes
2017	Coronation Street	Trina Robson	Guest role; 4 episodes
2018	Bulletproof	Scarlett Nugent	Guest role; episode: #1.3
2018	Butterfly	Jessica Markhamp	Guest role; mini-series; 2 episodes
2018	Relationshit	Amber	Regular role; mini-series; 8 episodes
2019	Doctors	Lauren Crighton	Guest role; episode: "Boot Camp"
2022	Threesome	Joanna Alexander	Guest role; 3 episodes (season 2)
2025	Professor T.	Lydia Birdsong	Guest role; 3 episodes (series 4)

=== Video games ===
Year	Title	Voice Role	Notes
2021	F1 2021	Zoe Akkerman	
