= List of Hollyoaks characters introduced in 2016 =

Hollyoaks is a British television soap opera that was first broadcast on 23 October 1995. The following is a list of characters that appeared in the serial in 2016, by order of first appearance. All characters were introduced by executive producer, Bryan Kirkwood. The first character to be introduced was James Nightingale (Gregory Finnegan), a mysterious solicitor who begins manipulating Cindy Cunningham (Stephanie Waring) and is later revealed to be the eldest Nightingale sibling, while February saw the arrival of Marnie Nightingale (Lysette Anthony), the Nightingale family matriarch. Liam Donovan (Maxim Baldry), Jesse Donovan (Luke Jerdy), and Adam Donovan (Jimmy Essex), the half-brothers of Grace Black (Tamara Wall) were introduced in March and April, with Lisa Loveday (Rachel Adedeji), the missing daughter of Simone Loveday (Jacqueline Boatswain) and Louis Loveday (Karl Collins), making her first appearance in late April.

D.S. Armstrong (Andrew Hayden-Smith), a police officer, debuted in June. August saw the first appearance of Maria (Fernanda Diniz), the former wife of Diego Salvador Martinez Hernandez De La Cruz (Juan Pablo Yepez), Ryan Knight (Duncan James), the fiancée of Amy Barnes (Ashley Slanina-Davies), and Courtney Campbell (Amy Conachan), the cousin of Cameron Campbell (Cameron Moore). Tracey Donovan (Lisa Maxwell), the mother of Grace, Liam, Jesse and Adam, joined the recurring cast in September, while Juanita Salvador Martinez Hernandez De La Cruz (Jacey Sallés), the mother of Diego, and Billy Brodie (Clive Russell), the estranged brother of Jack Osborne (Jimmy McKenna), were introduced for guest appearances.

Nick Savage, the nephew of Dirk Savage (David Kennedy), and Eva Falco (Kerry Bennett), the estranged niece of Jack, made their first appearances as regular characters in September. The McQueen family were expanded in November with the arrivals of Goldie McQueen (Chelsee Healey), Prince McQueen (Malique Thompson-Dwyer) and Hunter McQueen (Theo Graham). Marnie's mother Tabitha Maxwell-Brown (Linda Gray) was introduced in November, while Dr. Barton (Amanda Muggleton), a doctor treating Nancy Osborne (Jessica Fox), appeared in December.

== James Nightingale ==
James Nightingale, played by Gregory Finnegan, made his first screen appearance on 12 January 2016. He is the eldest son of Mac (David Easter) and Marnie Nightingale (Lysette Anthony). He is an older brother to Nathan (Jared Garfield), Ellie (Sophie Porley), and Alfie Nightingale (Richard Linnell).

The character and Finnegan's casting was announced on 24 December 2015. James works as a solicitor and a Hollyoaks publicist said that James would cause "terrible trouble locally" upon arriving in the show and specifically target established character Cindy Savage (Stephanie Waring). Ste Hay (Kieron Richardson) and Harry Thompson (Parry Glasspool) will be confused as to why he spends time with Cindy as they believe that James is gay, which was later confirmed to be true. Waring described James as being "very alluring and dashing, so of course Cindy is immediately taken in by his knight-in-shining-armour routine."

== Marnie Nightingale ==
Marnie Nightingale
- Hollyoaks character
- Portrayed by: Lysette Anthony
- Duration: 2016–2022
- First appearance: Episode 4311; 1 February 2016
- Last appearance: Episode 5764; 13 January 2022
- Introduced by: Bryan Kirkwood
In-universe information
- Occupation: Interior designer Restaurant owner Pub Landlady
- Mother: Tabitha Maxwell-Brown
- Husband: Mac Nightingale (backstory)
- Sons: Nathan Nightingale; James Nightingale
- Daughters: Ellie Nightingale
- Adoptive sons: Alfie Nightingale
- Stepdaughters: Juliet Nightingale
- Grandsons: Romeo Nightingale

Marnie Nightingale, played by Lysette Anthony, made her first on-screen appearance on 1 February 2016. The character and casting was announced on 24 January 2016. She is the ex-wife of Mac Nightingale (David Easter) and the biological mother of Nathan Nightingale (Jared Garfield), Ellie Nightingale (Sophie Porley) and James Nightingale (Gregory Finnegan), and the adoptive mother of Mac's biological son, Alfie Nightingale (Richard Linnell). It has been said that Marnie will waste no time in causing "chaos for Mac" and was billed as "a complex, intriguing and hilarious matriarch with a big broken heart" and that she can start a fight in an empty room. Marnie arrives in the village to help her son, James, take down Mac for events that happened in the past by using Cindy Savage (Stephanie Waring) against him, however she is unaware that Cindy is Alfie biological mother and the reason for her divorce from Mac. A reporter writing for the Inside Soap Yearbook described Marnie's entrance as "the classiest" of 2016, before noting that she arrived wearing "the biggest hat ever seen in soap!" In August 2017, Anthony was longlisted for "Best Bad Girl" at the Inside Soap Awards, while she and Nicole Barber-Lane (Myra McQueen) were longlisted for "Best Partnership". While Anthony was not shortlisted for "Best Bad Girl", she and Barber-Lane made the shortlist for "Best Partnership". On 6 November 2017, Anthony and Barber-Lane won the "Best Partnership" accolade. In 2018, Anthony was longlisted for Funniest Female at Inside Soap Awards, and a year later received a nomination for Best Partnership with Niamh Blackshaw, who portrays the role of Juliet Nightingale. Anthony left the show on 13 January 2022 after almost six years, when Marnie was killed-off in an explosion which occurred at her patisserie café, leading to her dying from a hidden brain haemorrhage. Anthony's exit was not announced prior to broadcast.

Marnie arrives in Hollyoaks revealing that she has been working with her son, James, with the inadvertent help of Cindy, to drain her ex-husband, Mac, of his finances as he was awarded everything by the courts when they divorced. She threatens to take away their daughter, Ellie, if he does not comply. Mac then gives her a large amount of money to keep her away from Ellie. Before she and James leave Hollyoaks, her other son, Nathan, accidentally reveals to her that Alfie is the biological son of Mac and Cindy. Marnie is furious and goes to The Dog in the Pond public house where she reveals to everybody that Alfie is Mac and Cindy's son. Marnie then attempts to persuade Diane Hutchinson (Alex Fletcher) and Tony Hutchinson (Nick Pickard) to sell The Hutch to her in an attempt to get closer to her children. However, their several attempts fail. Marnie, with the help of James, steal Diane's laptop to see whether if the restaurant is close to bankruptcy. It is then revealed that the restaurant could be bankrupt by Easter, so she and James then return to the restaurant in a bid to persuade Diane and Tony into selling the restaurant. However, Diane's nephew Scott Drinkwell (Ross Adams) catches them with the laptop as they return it. Marnie later learns that Tony earned money from betting with Darren Osborne (Ashley Taylor Dawson). She later informs Diane of this, leaving her upset. Marnie later helps Ellie open up a beauty parlour. At first, Ellie's beauty parlour is unsuccessful. However, when Ellie helps Freddie Roscoe (Charlie Clapham) and Tegan Lomax (Jessica Ellis) raise money for charity, her business starts to become a success.

After informing Alfie's family, Cindy then tells Marnie that Alfie's cancer had returned. This leaves Marnie shocked and upset. Marnie then tells Cindy that she had tried to be a good mother to Alfie, but she couldn't love him as much as she loved Nathan, James and Ellie. Marnie, Cindy and Neeta then put aside their differences so that they can all be there for Alfie. After learning about Rachel's death, Marnie becomes devastated. She later meets Freddie at The Loft. The pair talk and they then both go back to Freddie's house, where they have sex. The next day, Marnie learns that Freddie is going on a date with Ellie. She pretends that she and Freddie haven't met before and she introduces herself as Ellie's mother, leaving Freddie horrified. Marnie follows Ellie and Freddie as they go on a date at The Loft. While Ellie leaves, Marnie tells Freddie if she doesn't back away from her daughter, then she will tell her everything that happened between them. The next day, Freddie breaks up with Ellie, leaving her devastated. However, Ellie and Freddie later get back together again, much to Marnie's dismay. Since they got back together, Marnie has been constantly threatening Freddie to leave Ellie alone, but Freddie refuses. Freddie even blackmails her at one point by using a picture of Marnie kissing him. He said if she tries to break them up, he will show both Ellie and Mac the picture and they will never forgive her for what she did. Marnie and James continue their plan into getting The Hutch. Some of their plans have include having Scott to distil alcoholic drinks, using Myra McQueen (Nicole Barber-Lane) to bankrupt Tony as she wants £8,000 from Tony as compensation for having a neck injury caused by Scott and manipulating Scott into burning The Hutch down. Marnie and James are successful in buying The Hutch and rename it to "Nightingales"; at its opening, Ellie is furious since her mother told her that she would turn the restaurant into a cosmetics shop to fulfill her daughter's dream.

When Marnie's mother, Tabitha Maxwell-Brown (Linda Gray), visited the family, the majority of them were overwhelmed, apart from Mac who did not get along with Tabitha. Tabitha returned to America when Marnie proclaimed her love for Mac. In a bid to not lose her relationship with Ellie, Marnie claimed she had a brain tumour. When Mac discovered the truth surrounding her brain tumour, he threatened to reveal the truth. The family were left devastated when Nathan died after falling from a window and following this, Mac told the family that Marnie had been misdiagnosed and was not ill. Marnie later discovered Mac's evil actions including causing the school explosion killing his ex-fiancée Neeta in the process and pushing their son Nathan to death, she and James then decided to take revenge on Mac.

== Liam Donovan ==
Liam Donovan
- Hollyoaks character
- Portrayed by: Maxim Baldry (2016–2017); Jude Monk McGowan (2018–2020)
- Duration: 2016–2020
- First appearance: 28 March 2016
- Last appearance: 26 March 2020
- Introduced by: Bryan Kirkwood
- Spin-off appearances: Hollyoaks Later (2020)
In-universe information
- Occupation: Hairdresser; Club owner Drug dealer Gangster
- Father: Glenn Donovan
- Mother: Tracey Donovan
- Brothers: Adam Donovan; Jesse Donovan
- Half-brothers: Toby Wilde
- Half-sisters: Grace Black; Clare Devine
- Daughters: Iona Campbell
- Nephews: Curtis Royle; Rex Gallagher
- Nieces: Tori Devine-Banks (adoptive)

Liam Donovan, played by Maxim Baldry, made his first on screen appearance on 28 March 2016. The concept for the character was announced on 16 February 2016, while further details, such as the character's name and casting were announced on the 21 March 2016. Liam is introduced with his brothers, Adam Donovan (Jimmy Essex) and Jesse Donovan (Luke Jerdy), as the half-brothers of Grace Black (Tamara Wall). The brothers were billed as "a new injection of infectious energy". Baldry explained that Liam would attract the attention of multiple female village residents, including Tegan Lomax (Jessica Ellis) and Celine McQueen (Sarah George). Liam is described as someone who "always bails on relationships before things get too serious". Baldry expressed his delight at joining the cast. A reporter writing for the Inside Soap Yearbook 2017 described the Donovan brothers as "tasty", adding that they "set temperatures rising in Hollyoaks". On 11 April 2017, it was confirmed that Baldry had left the show and Liam would depart in the episode broadcast that day. He departed in what Digital Spy described as "a rather low-key exit" after blackmailing Grace for money.

On 3 August 2018, it was announced that Liam would return to the series later that month, with the role recast to actor Jude Monk McGowan. Liam returns after bumping into Courtney Campbell (Amy Conachan), the mother of his daughter Iona Campbell, in Magaluf. It was reported that since leaving the village, Liam had been on "a destructive path" while grieving for his former girlfriend, Eva Falco (Kerry Bennett). McGowan explained that Liam has not been dealing with his grief and instead has been "burying it in drugs, alcohol and women." He added that Liam is in a "destructive and dark place" as a result of not dealing with his grief. On whether Liam would reunite with his daughter, McGowan said that Liam would struggle to accept his daughter as Iona was unplanned for, and he and Eva were expecting a baby before her death. McGowan also thought that Liam would not reconnect with some of his family, but said that Liam "couldn't care less... and the feeling is mutual". Conachan believed that Jesse would accept Liam back into the family willingly, but Grace would not. She expected there to be "a few personality clashes" between them and predicted that Liam and Jesse could clash over Iona. He returned on 12 August 2018. Liam was killed-off on 26 March 2020.

Liam first appears in Hollyoaks at Dee Valley Hospital after his now ex-girlfriend accidentally burned his bum with a pair of hair straighteners. While receiving treatment for the burn, he catches the eyes of nurses Tegan Lomax (Jessica Ellis) and Celine McQueen (Sarah George). They pretend to be disinterested with him, but when they see him at The Loft, Celine makes a move on him when Tegan reacts to having too many alcoholic drinks. Celine and Liam make out in a hot tub but when she realises it was a girls' night, she heads back home with him. Later on, Tegan and Liam start to hang out and when they arrive at her house, they start kissing on the sofa. Liam ditches Tegan before she wakes up. After both dates, Celine and Tegan text Liam behind each other's backs. After learning about what happened, Celine and Tegan start fighting over him. When Lindsey Roscoe (Sophie Austin) gets annoyed with their behaviours, she makes them give their work badges to her and randomly selects who should go on the next date with him. Lindsey randomly selects Celine for the next date, which makes Tegan annoyed and jealous. However, Liam doesn't turn up to the date, leaving Celine angry. After Liam doesn't show up to the date, Celine and Tegan swear that they won't speak to another man until the summer. Unbeknownst to them, the pair text Liam constantly behind each other's backs. Later on, while Liam is in the hot tub, Tegan and Celine steal and make off with his clothes as revenge for two-timing them, leaving him naked in the tub.

Liam departs a year after his entrance when Grace murders Eva. The following year, Courtney is sent to transport drugs from Magaluf under the orders of Liam's father, Glenn Donovan (Bob Cryer). When she arrives to collect the drugs, she meets Liam and confronts him about the care of Iona. He then hands her the drugs and money for Iona's care. Liam later meets Glenn on a criminal job outside of the village; when he arrives, he sees Jay Johnson (Michael Dixon) about to shoot Glenn, so he shoots Jay. He returns to the village and reunites with Jesse, but continues to be hostile with Grace after what she did to Eva.

A year later, Liam was having an affair with Mercedes McQueen (Jennifer Metcalfe) since earlier in the year. They steal Harry Thompson's (Parry Glasspool) car to take for a joyride. Their night of fun turned into tragedy when, while being distracted by cocaine Liam was shoving in her face, Mercedes runs over Liam's half-sister Grace Black (Tamara Wall). Liam convinces Mercedes to flee the scene. Grace ends up severely injured and paralysed from the waist down. Mercedes wants to confess to the police, but Liam convinces her to let Harry take the fall. Mercedes feels guilty at first, but not for long. He later found out that Mercedes had gotten pregnant and had a termination, because she did not know whether he or her husband Sylver McQueen (David Tag) fathered the baby.

When Harry was on the run, not knowing that he is murdered by serial killer Breda McQueen (Moya Brady), Liam tells Mercedes that Harry's mobile has been disposed of and they can now run away together. Mercedes tells Liam she never intended to run away with him and was only using him to dispose of the evidence. It is then revealed that he still has the mobile, which means Mercedes' confession can still be revealed. However, during Harry's funeral, which nobody attends due to his actions at Grace. Lucky, he confesses his role and tells Grace it was Mercedes who was driving. Liam hands Grace Harry's phone which has a recording where Mercedes not only admits to the hit-and-run, but also to her affair with Liam and she also threatens to kill Harry if he goes to the police. Grace arrives at Harry's wake at The Dog in the Pond public house and plays the recording for all to hear causing everyone to know Mercedes' actions. She is later shot and Liam is the primary suspect. He is arrested, but eventually released. He later forms a relationship with James and they sleep together.

Liam's life is turned upside down when his younger brother Jesse dies from alcohol poisoning and he discovers that it was Maxine Minniver (Nikki Sanderson) who gave him too much, even though she attempted to stop him. Although he wanted to target her, Graces tell him not to and mentions how she suffered abuse from her late husband Patrick Blake (Jeremy Sheffield) despite they still blacklash at her for what she did to Damon. Although he agrees, but still continues on as a target at Maxine alongside Mercedes, Warren and James. But after discovering that Grace and James shot Mercedes, Liam summons them all to a "Devil's Dinner Party" at The Dog where he blows the truth in front of everyone. But before he can kill Grace himself, Warren arrives and tackles him to the ground. Liam chases after Grace and Mercedes, but trip and ends up dangling off above The Dog cellar, with Grace hanging onto him by his tie - until Grace lets go and allows Liam to fall down the stairs to his death.

== Jesse Donovan ==
Jesse Donovan
- Hollyoaks character
- Portrayed by: Luke Jerdy
- Duration: 2016–2020
- First appearance: 6 April 2016
- Last appearance: 24 January 2020
- Introduced by: Bryan Kirkwood
- Spin-off appearances: Hollyoaks Later (2020)
In-universe information
- Occupation: Hairdresser
- Father: Glenn Donovan
- Mother: Tracey Donovan
- Brothers: Liam Donovan; Adam Donovan
- Half-brothers: Toby Wilde
- Half-sisters: Grace Black; Clare Devine
- Wife: Courtney Campbell (2020)
- Adoptive daughters: Iona Campbell
- Nephews: Curtis Royle; Rex Gallagher; Toby Wilde (adoptive)
- Nieces: Iona Campbell; Tori Devine-Banks (adoptive)

Jesse Donovan, played by Luke Jerdy, made his first on screen appearance on 6 April 2016. Jesse, alongside his brothers Adam (Jimmy Essex) and Liam (Maxim Baldry), were introduced as the half-brothers of Grace Black (Tamara Wall). On 22 January 2020, Jesse was tragically killed off after binge drinking and collapsing in the village.

The concept for the character was announced on 16 February 2016 whilst further details such as the character's name and casting were announced on 21 March 2016. Jerdy has said that his character is "cheeky, loyal and has a real zest for life." He has been billed as "a fool for love, who's always unlucky with the ladies because his over-enthusiasm leads to him being friend-zoned." A reporter writing for the Inside Soap Yearbook 2017 described the Donovan brothers as "tasty", adding that they "set temperatures rising in Hollyoaks". In August 2017, Jerdy was longlisted for Funniest Male at the Inside Soap Awards. He did not progress to the viewer-voted shortlist.

Jesse first appears with his brother Liam Donovan when they pretend to be police officers. He questions Tegan Lomax (Jessica Ellis) and Celine McQueen (Sarah George) about the disappearance of the clothes and wallet belonging to Liam. He then takes them down to the police station for further questioning. However, it is revealed that it was a plan to get back at Tegan and Celine for stealing Liam's belongings. After Jesse reveals that he is really Liam's brother, Celine threatens to have him arrested for impersonating a police officer. Jesse returns with Liam a couple of weeks later, and is attracted to Tegan's older sister, Leela Lomax (Kirsty-Leigh Porter), however he is scared off by her controlling boyfriend, Cameron Campbell (Cameron Moore). Jesse later invites Ellie Nightingale (Sophie Porley) and Neeta Kaur (Amrit Maghera) to his and Liam's house party, and Neeta falls asleep in his arms with Ellie maliciously photographing her.

Ellie's manipulative mother, Marnie (Lysette Anthony), shows Neeta's fiancé, Mac Nightingale (David Easter) the photograph, so he savagely attacks Jesse in his own home, with Neeta screaming for him to stop. This subsequently puts a strain on Mac and Neeta's relationship, as she becomes frightened of his temper after watching his attack on Jesse. Jesse is later distressed after Liam is accidentally shot by their older half-sister, Grace, however is thrilled when he survives and begins a relationship with Celine, despite protests from Liam, who had had sex with her before. Jesse is devastated when Celine dumps him favour of marrying Diego Salvador Martinez Hernandez De La Cruz (Juan Pablo Yepez), unaware it is a scam so the McQueen family can inherit Diego's multimillion-pound inheritance. At the wedding, they do not marry because Celine cannot go through with it, but when she confesses this to Jesse, he chooses not to date her.

In January 2017, Jesse is arrested and imprisoned for Celine's murder after she goes missing. This came about after Adam discovered that Jesse had a one-night stand with his former fiancée, Darcy Wilde (Aisling Jarrett-Gavin), before she went missing. Later, Celine's real murderer is revealed to be Cameron, so Jesse is released, however receives abuse from his customers about Celine's disappearance. In June 2017, he begins a relationship with Darcy. When he proposed to Darcy, Jesse's heart was ultimately broken when she chose to be with Adam instead.

In 2018, Jesse began a relationship with Courtney Campbell - until he discovered that she was helping to make drugs for his dad Glenn Donovan (Bob Cryer). After Glenn dies, a heartbroken Jesse got back together with Courtney and the couple soon got engaged. Jesse discovered that Grace and James Nightingale (Gregory Finnegan) shot Mercedes McQueen (Jennifer Metcalfe). Devastated and believing his family would only ever create misery, Jesse got extremely drunk at his wedding reception until he later collapsed alone in the street and died of alcohol poisoning.

== Adam Donovan ==
Adam Donovan
- Hollyoaks character
- Portrayed by: Jimmy Essex
- Duration: 2016–2018
- First appearance: 6 April 2016
- Last appearance: 23 May 2018; 11 December 2018 (video-recording)
- Introduced by: Bryan Kirkwood
In-universe information
- Occupation: Hairdresser; Informant
- Father: Glenn Donovan
- Mother: Tracey Donovan
- Brothers: Liam Donovan; Jesse Donovan
- Half-brothers: Toby Wilde
- Half-sisters: Grace Black; Clare Devine
- Wife: Maxine Minniver (2017–2018)
- Adoptive daughters: Minnie Minniver
- Nephews: Curtis Royle; Rex Gallagher
- Nieces: Iona Campbell; Tori Devine-Banks (adoptive)

Adam Donovan, played by Jimmy Essex, made his first on screen appearance on 6 April 2016. Adam, alongside his brothers Jesse (Luke Jerdy) and Liam (Maxim Baldry), were introduced as the brothers of Grace Black (Tamara Wall).

The concept for the character was announced on 16 February 2016 whilst further details such as the character's name and casting were announced on 21 March 2016. Adam, as with the rest of the Donovans will be Grace Black's (Tamara Wall) brothers. A show insider has teased that Adam has "a strong conscience, which stops him from straying over certain lines that Grace wouldn't think twice about crossing." A reporter writing for the Inside Soap Yearbook 2017 described the Donovan brothers as "tasty", adding that they "set temperatures rising in Hollyoaks".

Adam arrives looking for his brothers, Liam and Jesse, and reveals himself as Grace's oldest half-brother. He insists that Liam and Jesse must come home, but he decides to stay after Grace's husband, Trevor Royle (Greg Wood), is murdered on their wedding day. On 23 May 2018, Adam is fatally shot by his father, Glenn (Bob Cryer).

== Lexi Roscoe ==
Lexi Roscoe
- Hollyoaks character
- Portrayed by: Uncredited (2016–2017); Marnie Fletcher (2024–present)
- Duration: 2016–2017, 2024–present
- First appearance: Episode 4387; 18 May 2016
- Introduced by: Bryan Kirkwood (2016); Hannah Cheers and Angelo Abela (2024)
In-universe information
- Other names: Kimberley Roscoe
- Father: Freddie Roscoe
- Mother: Lindsey Butterfield
- Stepmother: Grace Black
- Half-brothers: JJ Roscoe
- Grandmothers: Sandy Roscoe
- Uncles: Darren Osborne; Joe Roscoe; Ziggy Roscoe; Robbie Roscoe; Jason Roscoe
- Aunts: Kim Butterfield; Kath Butterfield
- First cousins: JJ Osborne; Frankie Osborne; Oscar Osborne; JJ Roscoe; Charlie Dean (adoptive)
- Other relatives: Auntie Christine

Lexi Roscoe, portrayed by Marnie Fletcher, is the daughter of Freddie Roscoe (Charlie Clapham) and Lindsey Roscoe (Sophie Austin). She is born in episode 4387, originally broadcast on 18 May 2016, the episode in which her mother's death is incited. She is originally named Kimberley after Lindsey's sister Kim Butterfield (Daisy Wood-Davis), but later renamed Lexi. She then later made an unannounced return to the show in episode 6357, originally broadcast on 19 April 2024, and is later revealed to be portrayed by former soap rival Emmerdale star Kelvin Fletcher's daughter, Marnie Fletcher, as part of Lexi's recast and return.

When Freddie decides he no longer wants anything to do with Kimberley, the name given to her by her mother, her custody is transferred to Freddie's brother Joe Roscoe (Ayden Callaghan) and his girlfriend Mercedes McQueen (Jennifer Metcalfe). Joe wants to call her Adele and Mercedes wants to call her Lexus, but eventually Joe registers the name Alexandra. Following Joe's death in October 2016, Lexi is taken to South Africa to live with her grandmother Sandy Roscoe (Gillian Taylforth). In April 2017, Sandy's sister, Christine (Kim Taylforth) brings Lexi back to the village and gives her to Freddie, telling him that Sandy cannot cope with looking after both Lexi and JJ. Freddie accepts Lexi and his parental responsibilities with help from his girlfriend Ellie Nightingale (Sophie Porley). After Freddie assaults Ellie's rapist Nick Savage (Ben-Ryan Davies), leaving him badly injured, he is charged with GBH, and is forced to go on the run. He takes Lexi with him when he flees to South Africa to join his mother and surviving brothers, Jason (Alfie Browne-Sykes) and Robbie (Charlie Wernham).

In April 2024, Freddie visits Lexi at a primary school. He has an interaction with Lexi, with Lexi not knowing he is her father.

== DS Gavin Armstrong ==
DS Gavin Armstrong
- Hollyoaks character
- Portrayed by: Andrew Hayden-Smith
- Duration: 2016–2017
- First appearance: 15 June 2016
- Last appearance: 22 December 2017
- Introduced by: Bryan Kirkwood
In-universe information
- Occupation: Detective Sergeant

Detective Sergeant Gavin Armstrong, played by Andrew Hayden-Smith, made his first on screen appearance on 15 June 2016 as a detective sergeant who starts to investigate the disappearance of Patrick Blake (Jeremy Sheffield).

D.S. Gavin Armstrong first appears with D.S. Geoff Thorpe (James Bradshaw). D.S. Armstrong and D.S. Thorpe meet with Patrick's daughter, Sienna Blake (Anna Passey), and D.S. Thorpe introduces her to D.S. Armstrong, informing her that he will be taking over the investigation into Patrick's disappearance. D.S. Thorpe then reveals that they have found some new evidence, intriguing Sienna. D.S. Armstrong and D.S. Thorpe take Sienna to the woods, where they reveal that her daughter and Patrick's real murderer, Nico Blake (Persephone Swales-Dawson), as their new witness. D.S. Armstrong reveals he believes that Patrick's wife, Maxine Minniver (Nikki Sanderson), was the person who murdered Patrick, and Sienna agrees to help the police get a confession from Maxine. D.S. Armstrong later reveals to Sienna that Maxine's boyfriend, "Mike Jones", is Warren Fox (Jamie Lomas) and Sienna persuades Warren to help them get a confession from Maxine.

D.S. Armstrong develops a sudden attraction to Leela Lomax (Kirsty-Leigh Porter), who begins receiving sinister messages. Leela immediately reports this to the police and Armstrong takes charge of the case. D.S. Armstrong implies to Leela that her friend, Zack Loveday (Duayne Boachie), could be stalking her, which Leela assumes. D.S. Armstrong provides Leela with her stalker's number and when she calls it, the phone rings in her daughter, Peri Lomax's (Ruby O'Donnell), bag. Peri denies any involvement and D.S. Armstrong concludes the stalker planted the phone on Peri. He later claims that Leela's former husband, Cameron Campbell (Cameron Moore), who is a serial killer, has escaped from prison, with the Lomax family losing their electricity shortly after. D.S. Armstrong fixes their electricity and claims Cameron had been hiding and never escaped. Leela thanks D.S. Armstrong and it is revealed that he is stalking Leela and watching her after planting a virus on her laptop.

D.S. Armstrong later deliberately interrupts an intimate moment between Leela and Zack. Following the murder of Amy Barnes' (Ashley Slanina-Davies), D.S. Armstrong arrests her former partner, Ste Hay (Kieron Richardson) and makes him confess to her murder. D.S. Armstrong supports Leela and they have sex, although Leela rejects him the following day, claiming it to be a mistake. Frustrated, D.S. Armstrong graffitis Leela's wall, which Leela reports to the police. D.S. Armstrong's colleague and Amy's widower, Ryan Knight (Duncan James), takes a statement from Leela and realises D.S. Armstrong is her stalker, but decides not to report it at risk of Ste being acquitted of Amy's murder. When D.S. Armstrong plants spray paint in Zack's bag and arrests him, Ryan releases Zack from custody and tells Leela that a man serving jail time is her stalker, before warning D.S. Armstrong and telling him to take sick leave and seek psychiatric help. However, as he is leaving, D.S. Armstrong watches Leela through his hidden camera.

D.S. Armstrong returns two months later just as Leela and Zack are about to reunite. A jealous D.S. Armstrong pushes Zack down the stairs outside the Lomax house. Zack is rushed to hospital where he says he was pushed. Zack's father, Louis Loveday (Karl Collins), reports this to D.S. Armstrong who promises to find Zack's attacker as he is clearly dangerous. D.S. Armstrong breaks into Leela's flat, stealing a photo of her and her nightgown. However, when Leela reports the theft to him he slips up by revealing information he wasn't supposed to know. Leela confronts D.S. Armstrong who blackmails her into silence by threatening to tell Zack that Louis is Daniel's biological father.

D.S. Armstrong then turns his attentions to Dirk Savage's (David Kennedy) wife, Cindy Savage (Stephanie Waring). He moves in with Dirk and Cindy as a lodger, sets up a fake website with nasty messages about Cindy and then plays the role of the hero. D.S. Armstrong then arranges for Dirk to receive a false telephone call claiming that his daughter, Liberty (Abi Phillips) has been in an accident. After Dirk leaves, D.S. Armstrong persuades Cindy to attend a conference in Liverpool. D.S. Armstrong accompanies Cindy to protect her, having booked adjacent rooms at the hotel for Cindy and himself. When Cindy realises the conference is a fake, D.S. Armstrong convinces her that she should stay in a locked room with him for her safety. D.S. Armstrong deliberately spills wine on Cindy's dress and tries to kiss her. Cindy rejects D.S. Armstrong, reminding him she is married to Dirk. While in the bathroom, Cindy receives a phone call from Leela warning her that D.S. Armstrong is her stalker. Cindy runs for it. D.S. Armstrong is arrested but later released on bail.

Milo Entwistle (Nathan Morris) visits D.S. Armstrong in prison, where D.S. Armstrong threatens to reveal Milo's secret unless he brings him Cindy's nightie. When Milo does deliver, D.S. Armstrong discovers that it is the wrong one, so he threatens Milo again, getting him to hack into the prison system and forge a document to get him released. After D.S. Armstrong is released, Cindy and Leela walk into Nightingale's restaurant and stand up to him. D.S. Armstrong falls for a trap set by Milo, and is later killed after being electrocuted by Christmas lights orchestrated by Milo.

The character and casting was announced on 12 May 2016. A Hollyoaks spokesperson has billed him as "young, driven, and ambitious", with Hayden-Smith stating that his character is "very authoritative so anyone hiding secrets is anxious when they are in his presence, and rightly so."

== Maria ==
Maria
- Hollyoaks character
- Portrayed by: Fernanda Diniz
- First appearance: 1 August 2016
- Last appearance: 31 August 2016
- Introduced by: Bryan Kirkwood
In-universe information
- Occupation: Drug smuggler
- Husband: Diego Salvador Martinez Hernandez De La Cruz (until 2016)

Maria, played by Fernanda Diniz, made her first on screen appearance on 1 August 2016. Maria was introduced as the "sister" of established character Diego Salvador Martinez Hernandez De La Cruz (Juan Pablo Yepez).

Maria arrives in Hollyoaks unexpectedly, surprising Diego. She then meets Mercedes and announces that she will be staying in Hollyoaks for a bit. Mercedes offers to take her bag, but Maria is reluctant. The pair tussle over it and the bag drops onto the floor, revealing a stash of drugs. It is revealed that Maria has smuggled cocaine into the village so she can give the drugs to a drug dealer. Mercedes orders Diego to kick Maria out, but Maria cannot go until she has given the drugs. Maria then meets Diego's girlfriend Myra. Myra first believes that Diego is cheating on her with Maria, but when he introduces her as his sister, she is shocked that his sister came unexpectedly. When Myra helps Maria with her belongings, Maria and Diego talk Spanish in private. Maria blackmails him into helping her with the deal, otherwise she will reveal his darkest secret to Myra - who he really is. Later on, Maria, Diego and Mercedes talk about the drugs, which Myra overhears. Diego and Maria lie about the drug deal, saying that Maria has been taking drugs so she can relieve her physical pain. Maria and Diego go to the Hollyoaks city wall. However, Maria suddenly collapses and is taken back to the McQueen house. Diego offers to take the drugs for her, but Maria refuses as the dealer is expecting a female. Maria then suggests that Mercedes take the drugs but Mercedes refuses. Maria later reveals that she is Diego's wife.

The character had been previously mentioned on-screen, but her arrival and casting was not announced until 26 July 2016. Maria arrives in the village unexpectedly, to the shock of Diego, sparking immediate chaos. It was revealed that she would tell Diego and Mercedes McQueen (Jennifer Metcalfe) that she is smuggling drugs, with the latter ordering Diego to get rid of Maria and the drugs. Diego and Maria later meet with a dealer in order to "solve her problems once and for all", but Diego's partner Myra McQueen (Nicole Barber-Lane) would "start to smell a rat".

== DS Ryan Knight ==
DS Ryan Knight
- Hollyoaks character
- Portrayed by: Duncan James
- Duration: 2016–2018
- First appearance: 12 August 2016
- Last appearance: 7 May 2018
- Introduced by: Bryan Kirkwood
In-universe information
- Occupation: Detective Sergeant
- Wife: Amy Barnes (2017)
- Stepsons: Lucas Hay
- Stepdaughters: Leah Barnes
- Uncles: Geoff Thorpe

Detective Sergeant Ryan Knight, played by Duncan James, made his first appearance on 12 August 2016. He is introduced as Amy Barnes's (Ashley Slanina-Davies) fiancé following her return to the show. James' departure was announced October 2017. Ryan's last episode aired on 7 May 2018. In his very last scene, it appeared Ryan had drowned in a river. On 8 May 2018, it was confirmed Ryan had drowned when his body was discovered.

The character and casting was announced on 22 May 2016. Ryan has been billed as "a good guy in a committed relationship who will move into the village. He is a grounded family man with principles and integrity but who will fight tooth and nail for what he believes in." Slanina-Davies was reintroduced following her 2012 departure, with James confirmed to be playing Amy's fiancée, Ryan alongside the announcement. Ryan was described as the "polar opposite" of Amy's ex-partner Ste Hay (Kieron Richardson). It was announced that Ryan would "go head-to-head" with Ste for a storyline tackling blended family life. A show spokesperson teased that "viewers will be torn between luckless Ste and a man who on paper is a better example for his children but not their dad."

On 8 August 2016, the show announced that a new storyline would begin on-screen which would find Ryan under suspicion of child abuse. The storyline would begin when Ste discovers a bruise on his and Amy's daughter, Leah Barnes' (Ela-May Demircan) arm, and suspect Ryan to be responsible. Daniel Kilkelly of Digital Spy described the storyline as "explosive".

For his portrayal of Ryan, James was nominated for Best Newcomer at the 22nd National Television Awards.

Ryan arrives in Hollyoaks with his fiancée, Amy Barnes, and her two children, Leah and Lucas (William Hall). Ryan is the nephew of D.S. Geoff Thorpe (James Bradshaw) and joins his uncle working at the Dee Valley police station. Ryan immediately clashes with Amy's ex-boyfriend, Ste Hay. Ste does not want Ryan around his kids and they constantly come to blows. Amy and Ryan win full custody of the kids and try to cut Ste out of their lives. One night, after an argument with Amy, Ryan sleeps with Mercedes McQueen (Jennifer Metcalfe). Amy finds out Ryan cheated and dumps him so he leaves for Canada.

Ryan returns from Canada weeks later and begs Amy to marry him. Amy comes around and they are married in a beautiful ceremony. After the ceremony, Ryan and Amy announce they are moving to the United States, where Ryan has been offered a job. Ste refuses to let Ryan and Amy take the kids and they go to an emergency custody hearing. The judge grants Ryan and Amy permission to move with the kids, leaving Ste furious. Amy is murdered later that night, her body being found by Ryan and her father, Mike (Tony Hirst).

Ste is charged with Amy's murder and Ryan takes over raising Leah and Lucas. Ryan grows close to Mercedes and they begin seeing each other. Ryan had claimed he was at the Loft while Amy was murdered, but the CCTV footage is missing. Ryan admits to Mercedes that he stole the footage because he had cheated on Amy that night. The person he cheated with turns out to be Kyle Kelly (Adam Rickitt). Ryan is scared that the truth about his adultery and sexuality will come out. Ryan sleeps with Kyle again, but rejects him immediately afterwards and Kyle threatens to expose their affair to Mercedes. In order to stop him, Ryan has Kyle arrested for drug dealing, but Kyle ends up telling Mercedes anyway and she dumps Ryan.

Ryan works with Ste's lawyer James Nightingale (Gregory Finnegan), who hates Ste for ruining his relationship with John Paul McQueen (James Sutton), to throw the case against him. James begins to take things too far and Ryan cuts ties with him. Ryan testifies to Ste's good character in court and he is acquitted. Ryan's colleague, D.S. Gavin Armstrong (Andrew Hayden-Smith), is later charged with Amy's murder.

Through a flashback, it is revealed that it was Ryan who murdered Amy. Ryan had accidentally called Amy during his encounter with Kyle and left her a voicemail. When Ryan arrived home, Amy furiously confronted him about cheating on her with a man on their wedding day. Amy said how foolish she felt to have fallen in love with another gay man and that she was leaving with her father immediately. Amy threatened to tell everyone that Ryan was gay and he murdered her in a fit of rage.

After being released from prison, Kyle begs Ryan to give them a chance, but Ryan vehemently refuses. Ryan tries to pick up a male prostitute, but then has to pretend he is on sting operation when the prostitute turns out to be Harry Thompson (Parry Glasspool). James is suspicious and confronts Ryan, who emotionally admits that he sleeps with men. Needing a cover, Ryan begins dating Ste's half-sister, Tegan Lomax (Jessica Ellis).

After some time, Ryan becomes overwhelmed with guilt and decides to confess to murdering Amy. However, Diane Hutchinson (Alex Fletcher) tells Ryan that it was Harry who murdered Amy. It turns out that, shortly before Ryan had murdered Amy, Harry had gone to confront her about taking Ste's children and she accidentally fell and hit her head. Harry panicked and ran out, leaving Amy unconscious on the floor. Ryan threatens to turn Harry into the police, but James stops him by threatening to reveal he is gay.

During an explosive argument about Ryan's treatment of Tegan, Ste and Ryan impulsively sleep together. Ryan declares it a mistake and begs Ste not to tell anybody. When Harry is arrested for Amy's murder, Tegan is not happy to learn Ryan already knew what Harry had done. Ryan and Ste turn to each other for comfort and Tegan sees them in the heat of passion. Tegan angrily confronts Ryan and he accidentally calls Tegan by Amy's name, making her realise that he killed Amy. When Tegan threatens to go to the police, Ryan suffocates her. Believing that he has killed her, Ryan places Tegan in the bath to make it look like an accident. Tegan turns out to still be alive, but she is in a coma. Ryan learns Tegan left Kim Butterfield (Daisy Wood-Davis) a voicemail the night he attacked her. Kim tells Ryan she knows he killed Amy so he kidnaps her and locks her in the basement of Hollyoaks High. Ste tells Ryan that Tegan has woken up from her coma, though this turns out to be a lie told by Tegan's niece, Peri (Ruby O'Donnell). Ryan leaves town fearing that the truth about him will be exposed.

Ryan rushes back to town when he receives a message from Ste saying Leah is in hospital. It turns out Leah is fine and that she had actually sent him the message. Ste's other half-sister, Leela (Kirsty-Leigh Porter), publicly confronts Ste and Ryan about their affair. Ryan finally accepts that he is gay and starts a relationship with Ste. When Geoff reveals that he knows about Ryan sleeping with Kyle the night of Amy's murder, Ryan strangles his uncle to death, which is witnessed by Glenn Donovan (Bob Cryer). In exchange for his silence, Glenn gets Ryan to help him frame Shane Sweeney (Michael Salami) for the murders of Geoff and a man Glenn had murdered, called Trigger (Adam Sina).

Tegan wakes up from her coma and reveals everything Ryan has done. Ryan is finally arrested for Amy's murder. Ryan makes a deal with Kim's girlfriend, Farrah Maalik (Krupa Pattani): he will tell her the location of Kim's body (though Kim is actually still alive), but only if she breaks him out of prison. Farrah helps Ryan escape, but then he discovers she is wearing a wire and escapes. Ryan tracks down Ste, Harry, Leah, and Lucas at a campsite and confesses to all of his crimes. Harry chases after Ryan and they have a struggle, causing Ryan to fall backwards into a river. Ryan pleads with Harry to help him, but Harry walks away and Ryan appears to drown.

Harry feels guilty over what he did to Ryan and fears he may actually still be alive. However, it is confirmed Ryan died when his body is discovered. Everyone affected by Ryan's actions has to figure out a way to pick up the pieces.

== Courtney Campbell ==
Courtney Donovan (also Campbell), played by Amy Conachan, is the cousin of Cameron Campbell (Cameron Moore) and his brother Lockie (Nick Rhys). She made her first on screen appearance on 29 August 2016.

== Tracey Donovan ==
Tracey Donovan
- Hollyoaks character
- Portrayed by: Lisa Maxwell
- Duration: 2016–2017
- First appearance: 12 September 2016
- Last appearance: 2 October 2017
In-universe information
- Husband: Fraser Black (backstory); Glenn Donovan (backstory)
- Sons: Adam Donovan; Liam Donovan; Jesse Donovan
- Daughters: Clare Devine; Grace Black
- Grandsons: Curtis Royle; Rex Gallagher
- Granddaughters: Iona Campbell; Tori Devine-Banks (adoptive)

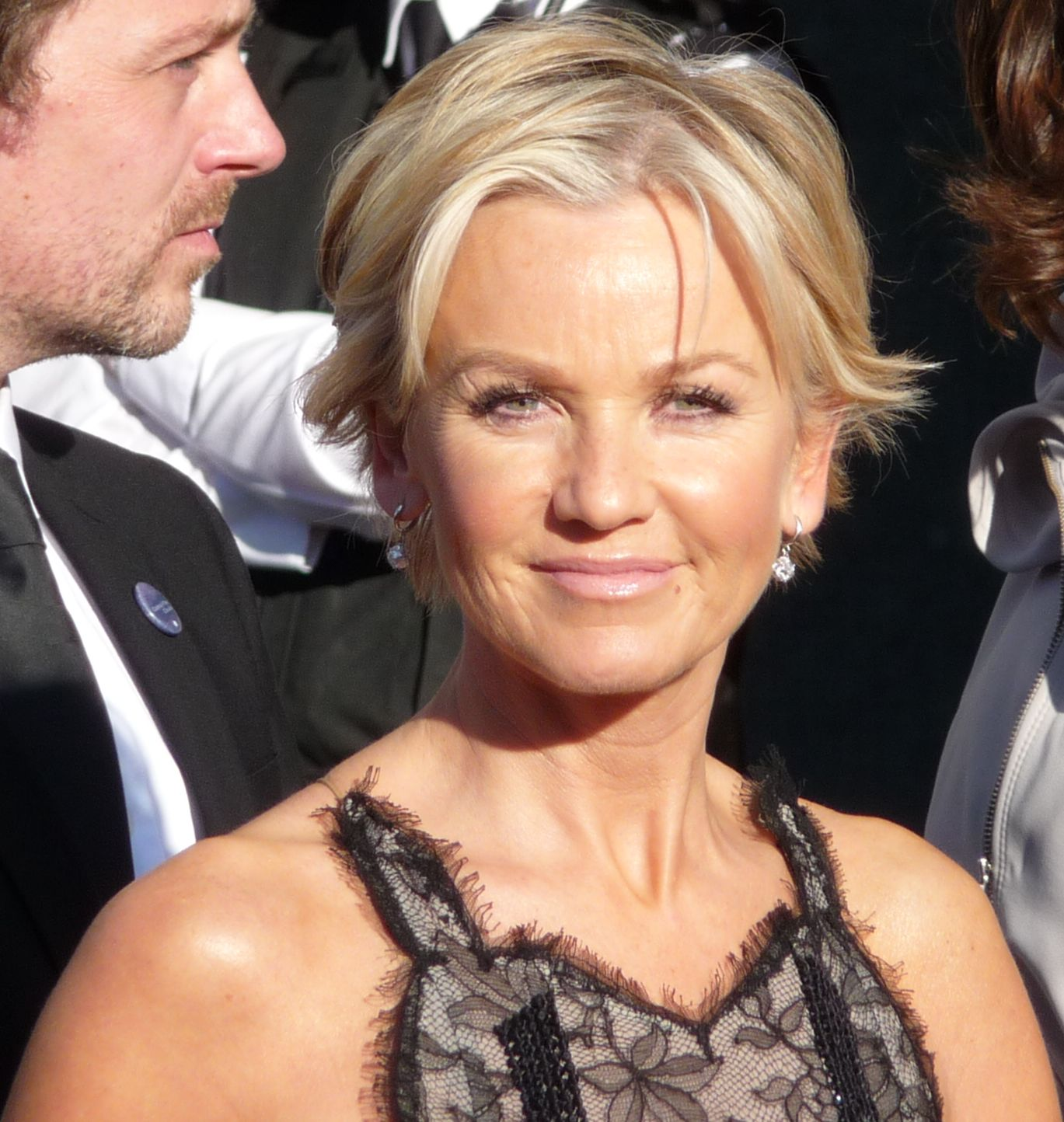
Lisa Maxwell portrayed Tracey from 2016 to 2017.

Tracey Donovan, played by Lisa Maxwell, made her first on screen appearance on 12 September 2016. Tracey is the mother of established characters Clare Devine (Gemma Bissix), Grace Black (Tamara Wall), Adam Donovan (Jimmy Essex), Liam Donovan (Maxim Baldry) and Jesse Donovan (Luke Jerdy) and the ex-wife of the character Fraser Black (Jesse Birdsall).

The character and casting was announced on 7 August 2016, with further details about the character revealed on 8 August 2016. Maxwell filmed her first scenes prior to the announcement of her casting. The character is billed as a "train wreck" who has had a "tough life", which Daniel Kilkelly of Digital Spy described as not being "a huge shock" considering she was married to Fraser, a "dangerous gangster". Tracey's backstory states that she left Grace and her sister Clare Devine (Gemma Bissix) when they were "very young" in an attempt to "escape the dark clutches" of "evil" Fraser. It continued to state that Grace has since "resented" her mother because she was left to live a "dangerous life of crime and corruption", whilst her mother went on to meet a man who she had three more children, Adam, Liam and Jesse, with. Kilkelly observed that Tracey's backstory explained why the three brothers were "so happy-go-lucky" in comparison to Grace.

It was teased that there could be "fireworks" when Tracey and Grace reunite because they "are not the best of friends" and there is "not a lot of love lost between them." A show insider added that Tracey would add an "interesting dynamic" to the Donovan family and that Maxwell "enjoyed" filming, with show bosses believing that the audience would "love" scenes between Maxwell and Wall. For the role, Maxwell has required to have a "make-under" to make her appear older on-screen as there is only a 13-year age difference between Maxwell and Wall, with her describing the "make-under" as "great, terrific fun". Kilkelly said that he "hardly recognised" Maxwell in her first promotional image. Executive producer Bryan Kirkwood later revealed that Maxwell would become a "recurring guest star", meaning that she would "pop up from time to time" and not move into the village on a regular basis. On 21 September 2017, Tracey was killed off when she drowned after falling off a boat following an altercation with her arch-enemy, Darcy Wilde (Aisling Jarrett-Gavin). She appeared in a flashback sequence on 2 October 2017, which was her final appearance.

== Juanita Salvador Martinez Hernandez De La Cruz ==
Juanita Salvador Martinez Hernandez De La Cruz
- Hollyoaks character
- Portrayed by: Jacey Sallés
- First appearance: 19 September 2016
- Last appearance: 30 September 2016
- Introduced by: Bryan Kirkwood
In-universe information
- Brothers: Starling Carlos Gonzalez De La Cruz
- Sons: Diego Salvador Martinez Hernandez De La Cruz
- Granddaughters: Carmina McQueen

Juanita Salvador Martinez Hernandez De La Cruz, played by Jacey Sallés made her first on-screen appearance on 19 September 2016. She was introduced as the mother of Diego Salvador Martinez Hernandez De La Cruz (Juan Pablo Yepez). The character and casting was announced on 21 August 2016. It was reported that Juanita would arrive in Hollyoaks to meet his new partner. She was billed as "a glamorous and feisty woman with an iron will, who always wanted the best for her son".

Juanita is first mentioned when Diego and his much older pregnant fiancée, Myra McQueen (Nicole Barber-Lane), are struggling financially, and Diego states that Juanita is worth £5 million. Excited, Myra calls Juanita in from Venezuela in order to get Diego's inheritance. However, upon her arrival, Juanita sees Myra's face on front-page news after conning the newspaper company into believing that Jesse Donovan (Luke Jerdy) is her unborn child's father. Panicked after hearing Juanita insulting her, Myra asks her niece Celine McQueen (Sarah George) to pretend to be Diego's fiancée, which she does and Juanita takes a shining to her. She promises to return for their wedding, and so Celine revises Diego's ancestry in order to be believed as Diego's fiancée. This hurts Myra having to watch Diego and Celine marry, and equally hurts Celine who is desperate to be with her lover, Jesse.

Juanita later returns for Celine and Myra's daughter Mercedes McQueen's (Jennifer Metcalfe) hen parties, who is marrying Joe Roscoe (Ayden Callaghan) at the same time that Diego will marry Celine. Juanita insults the family home and Cindy Savage (Stephanie Waring), which instantly leads to her becoming unwelcome around the village. The hen night ends disastrously, however, when Mercedes, Cindy and Tegan Lomax (Jessica Ellis) are all arrested for fighting. On the day of the wedding, Diego and Celine are prepared to marry as Juanita watches on, however a visit from Jesse throws Celine's intentions. As Diego and Celine say their vows, Myra arrives and stops the wedding, revealing to Juanita that she is engaged to Diego and that Diego is the father of her unborn baby. Juanita then gives Diego an ultimatum: he either leaves Myra or he will not get his share of her inheritance. Diego chooses to be with Myra and their baby, and so Juanita storms out of the church, infuriated.

== Billy Brodie ==
Billy Brodie
- Hollyoaks character
- Portrayed by: Clive Russell; Rian Gordon (flashback)
- First appearance: 20 September 2016
- Last appearance: 21 September 2016
- Introduced by: Bryan Kirkwood
In-universe information
- Occupation: Police officer
- Family: Osborne
- Mother: Aggie Osborne
- Half-brothers: Jack Osborne; Kenneth Osborne
- Daughters: Eva Falco
- Nephews: Darren Osborne
- Nieces: Ruth Osborne; Natalie Osborne; Rachel Osborne; Bethany Cunningham

Billy Brodie, played by Clive Russell, appeared in two episodes on 20 September 2016 and 21 September 2016. Billy was introduced as Jack Osborne's (Jimmy McKenna) brother and the father of Eva Falco (Kerry Bennett).

Jack receives a visiting order from Billy and visits him in prison. It becomes clear that Jack is hiding a huge secret, which Billy is aware of and uses this to persuade Jack to give him a large amount of money. However, Jack refuses, and Billy reveals that he is dying from a heart condition. The following day, Billy is rushed to hospital where his daughter Eva visits him and he asks her not to interfere with Jack anymore. Billy dies shortly afterwards, with Eva ignoring her father's requests and seeking revenge on Jack. One year after his death, his name was finally cleared when his brother Jack confess the truth.

The character had been referenced several times on screen before being cast, with more details about the character along with his casting was announced on 20 August 2016. Billy is set to reveal a deadly secret to Eva which will "make a large impact on the Osborne family."

== Nick Savage ==
Nick Savage
- Hollyoaks character
- Portrayed by: Ben-Ryan Davies
- Duration: 2016–2017
- First appearance: 21 September 2016
- Last appearance: 29 June 2017
- Introduced by: Bryan Kirkwood
In-universe information
- Occupation: Student
- Uncles: Dirk Savage; Dr. Charles S'avage
- First cousins: Dodger Savage (adoptive); Will Savage; Liberty Savage; Dennis Savage

Nick Savage, played by Ben-Ryan Davies, made his first on screen appearance on 21 September 2016. He is introduced as Dirk Savage's (David Kennedy) nephew. He made his final appearance on 29 June 2017.

Nick first arrives when his uncle Dirk Savage's (David Kennedy) wife Cindy (Stephanie Waring) opens the door for Nick, who introduces himself. Nick reveals that Dirk allowed him to stay for university. Nick starts working at The Hutch when Marnie Nightingale (Lysette Anthony) employs him. Nick cannot cope with being a waiter and decides to swap jobs with Cindy. During "Freshers" week, Cindy's daughter Holly Cunningham (Amanda Clapham) introduces him to her friends and unknown to Nick, Holly is attracted to him. Holly is upset when Tegan Lomax (Jessica Ellis) flirts with Nick. Nick confronts Freddie Roscoe (Charlie Clapham) when he argues with Ellie Nightingale (Sophie Porley). Ellie later kisses Nick and they start talking. They later go to Ellie's bedroom, where a drunken Ellie falls asleep, however Nick misreads the situation and continues kissing Ellie. Ellie is shocked the following morning when Nick claims that they had sex, as Ellie does not remember giving her consent. Ellie starts acting awkwardly with Nick, who has begun flirting with Holly, which worries Ellie.

In 2017, Nick is later arrested after Ellie reports him to the police for raping her, but the charges are dropped after Lisa Loveday (Rachel Adedeji) reports it as a fake, due to her part for revenge to Ellie's father, Mac Nightingale (David Easter). However, Nick later turns against Ellie, and offers his condolences following the death of her older brother, Nathan Nightingale (Jared Garfield). Nick begins an affair with Tegan, having sex regularly at work. When Tegan believes she is pregnant, Nick rejects her, so Tegan tells Holly about their affair. Holly forgives Nick, and they reconcile. Nick and Holly go to his graduation party at The Dog, where Zack Loveday (Duayne Boachie) tells Nick that he and Holly kissed. Nick humiliates Holly, but she forgives him and they go back home. Nick wants to have sex with Holly, but she refuses. Nick ignores her pleas and rapes her, in a similar fashion to Ellie. The next day, Holly confronts Nick about her not giving consent, but he becomes aggressive and defensive towards her. Holly reports Nick to the police after telling Ellie what Nick has done to her.

Nick is released on bail and goes to the hospital to talk to Tegan. When Tegan refuses to allow him to stay with her and her family, he brands her a "bitch". Nick talks to Holly, blackmailing her by threatening to upload their sex tape online if she refuses to retract her statement. Nick tells Dirk that neither Ellie or Holly consented to having sex. Dirk phones the police and Nick confesses to raping Ellie and Holly. He is arrested and thrown out by his parents. Nick asks for Dirk's help, but he is reluctant. While waiting for Dirk at the folly, Nick is confronted by Holly and she asks him to leave. Nick is sentenced to 7 years imprisonment for the rapes of Ellie and Holly.

The character and casting was announced on 18 August 2016. Nick is Dirk's fun-loving nephew who's able to make "a dodgy deal like any true Savage and he's also a typical ladies' man" who will catch the eyes of several female residents of the village. Nick has been billed as "fun-loving", "the popular boy who all the lads wanted to be friends with and all the girls fancied" and someone able to make "a dodgy deal like any true Savage and he's also a typical ladies' man". It was reported that Nick would catch the eyes of several female residents of the village. It was also announced that Nick would be involved in a storyline which would see the issue of sexual consent explored. The show worked with Rape Crisis and youth charity The Mix when creating the storyline and show bosses hoped that the storyline would "divide opinions", but promised that the issue would be "sensitively explored".

The storyline would begin where Ellie and Nick have sex after getting drunk during Fresher's Week, but the following morning Ellie would wake up with no recollection of what happened. Davies said that he was "really interested" in seeing his character's progress throughout the story. He added that it was "a very important issue" which carried "big responsibility". Davies said that he was "honoured" that the show had entrusted him with the storyline. Zoë Bailie from The Mix said that the story "couldn't be more timely" and added that "working together with Hollyoaks, we hope to break down the myths surrounding consent. We want to help young people understand what consent is, what it isn't and importantly how to make sure they have it before entering into a sexual experience."

== Eva Falco ==
Eva Falco
- Hollyoaks character
- Portrayed by: Kerry Bennett
- Duration: 2016–2017
- First appearance: 21 September 2016
- Last appearance: 17 January 2017
- Introduced by: Bryan Kirkwood
In-universe information
- Occupation: Detective Inspector
- Family: Osborne
- Father: Billy Brodie
- Uncles: Jack Osborne
- First cousins: Ruth Osborne; Darren Osborne; Natalie Osborne; Rachel Osborne; Bethany Cunningham
- Other relatives: Jack Osborne; Francine Osborne; Oscar Osborne

Eva Falco, played by Kerry Bennett, is the niece of Jack Osborne (Jimmy McKenna). She first appeared on 21 September 2016. The character and casting was announced on 18 August 2016. Her backstory states that she "drifted in and out of care homes" due to her father, Billy, disappearing and her mother dying at a young age. This transformed Eva into "an angry tearaway", until she joined the police force. Eva eventually found her father, but comes to the village looking for the person who kept them apart in order to take revenge on them. The character left the series in scenes that aired on 17 January 2017. Eva was killed off when Grace murdered her while Eva and Liam were travelling on a train. Her departure had been teased through the show's social media platforms on 16 January. On her departure, Bennett said "I've had such an amazing time and felt so welcomed and supported from the start. I'm sad to be leaving - six months has flown by way too fast - but it feels awesome to have been involved in such a great storyline on such a fabulous production."

Eva is first seen visiting her father, Billy Brodie (Clive Russell), in hospital and is left devastated when he dies. Despite warning from Billy not to, Eva seeks revenge on Billy's brother, Jack, believing he is responsible for her father's life in prison. She breaks into his home and trashes the place, with Jack and Esther Bloom (Jazmine Franks) reporting the crime to the police. Eva is revealed as the detective in charge of the investigation and informs Jack and Esther that there is nothing to worry about. Eva later meets Liam Donovan (Maxim Baldry) in The Loft nightclub and they have sex. When she discovers he was planning to use her, Eva decides to use Liam in her plan to take revenge on Jack. Eva asks Liam to look after some drugs for her, which she took from the evidence room at the police station, however she later takes them back and allows Liam to believe that he has lost them. Eva tells Liam that she needs a large amount of money to pay the drug dealer, and is frustrated when Liam confides in his older half-sister, Grace Black (Tamara Wall), who is a former gangster. Eva later explains to Liam that the drug dealer she is dealing with has threatened to kill her, however she will be spared if she murders somebody in return. Eva then gives Liam a photograph of Jack, and orders him to kill him. However, after talking to Jack's cancer-stricken foster daughter Jade Albright (Kassius Nelson), Eva stops Liam from murdering Jack with a car boot lid. Eva continues her hate campaign against Jack, and on the day of Billy's funeral, is furious to see Jack laying flowers in his memory. Eva then charges over to the Osbornes armed with a gun, however Liam contacts Jack and warns him that he is in danger. Cindy Cunningham (Stephanie Waring) later visits the Osbornes to find that the entire family has vanished without a trace.

Liam is certain that Eva is involved with the disappearance of Jack and his family, but she explains that when she arrived at the Osbornes', they had already gone. Liam later finds a message from Tom Cunningham (Ellis Hollins) to his girlfriend Peri Lomax (Ruby O'Donnell), asking to meet her in the folley, however he keeps this from Eva. After Cindy phones the police on Liam, believing he knows something about the Osbornes' disappearance, Eva finds Tom's message in Liam's wallet, and is furious that Liam kept it from her, because Tom could have led her to Jack. When Liam attempts to thwart her plans yet again, Eva records Liam confessing that Grace shot him, and blackmails him into keeping quiet. She later finds an address for Kim Butterfield (Daisy Wood-Davis), to whom Jack has been transferring money monthly. She questions Kim, but her interrogation is disrupted by the arrival of Grace and Cindy. Eva then threatens Liam, saying that if Grace does not leave her to find the Osbornes herself, she will give her recorded confession to the police. Liam later forgives Eva, and they continue their relationship, but she is still intent on finding the Osbornes. She is thrilled when Tegan Lomax (Jessica Ellis) informs her that Kim had visited the hospital in search of medication, and so Eva puts all hospitals in the borough on alert. She is called to one hospital where Jack's son, Darren Osborne (Ashley Taylor Dawson), has brought his wife Nancy (Jessica Fox), but is frustrated to find that they have vanished.

Eva refuses to give up the search for the family, and is later informed by Peri that Tom is back in the village. When Tom refuses to reveal the Osbornes' whereabouts during questioning, Eva threatens to charge him with murdering the Osbornes unless he tells her. Tom's former guardian, Sam "O.B." O'Brien (Darren Jeffries), later promises Eva that he will get Tom to confess. However, when Eva leaves Tom in a police car momentarily to take her to the Osbornes, O.B. appears and helps Tom escape, with the whole village doubting Eva's abilities as a detective over the incident, infuriating her. It is later revealed that O.B. is an ally of Jack's, and is helping him find out who wants him dead, and he reveals his suspicions of Eva's motives. O.B. also shares this with Grace, who worries due to Eva's relationship with Liam. Eva continues her quest to find the Osbornes as 2016 comes to an end, and is stunned when she bumps into Jack on New Year's Eve. She takes him back to the Osborne household armed with a gun, where Darren, Nancy and Jack's wife Frankie (Helen Pearson) arrive and she holds them all hostage. It is then revealed that when they were teenagers, Billy was feuding with a local schoolboy and severely beat him up, and taunted Jack to do the same. Jack kicked the schoolboy, which was the blow that lead to his death. Jack was then manipulated by the police to get Billy imprisoned, who then manipulated Eva to believe that Jack was responsible for the way her life turned out. Suddenly, Kim, Grace and Esther arrive and as Jack and Darren attempt to wrestle the gun off Eva, the trigger is pulled and Esther is shot, leaving her in a coma.

Eva goes into hiding, knowing that Grace is after her. Liam and Jack, who has now been exiled from his family, help Eva to escape the village, which ultimately leads to Liam being banished from his family, too. Liam remains in contact with Eva, and after convincing his older brother, Adam Donovan (Jimmy Essex) to help them financially, Liam leaves the village with Eva. Elsewhere, Esther regains consciousness in hospital and has post-traumatic amnesia, and orders Grace to get revenge on Eva for shooting her. At the train station, Eva fears that the police will catch her, but she and Liam manage to board the train. However, after Liam leaves for a moment, he returns to find Eva seemingly sleeping, but finds the back of her head bleeding and realises that she is dead. Grace is then shown leaving the train station, having shot Eva in the back of the head for what she did to Esther. An investigation into Eva's murder is then underway, with Liam working with D.S. Geoff Thorpe (James Bradshaw) to bring Grace down. Liam is later devastated when D.S. Thorpe reveals that Eva was pregnant with his baby when she died, making him more determined to get a confession out of Grace.

== Goldie McQueen ==
Goldie McQueen
- Hollyoaks character
- Portrayed by: Chelsee Healey
- Duration: 2016–2026
- First appearance: Episode 4513; 9 November 2016
- Last appearance: Episode 6683; 23 February 2026
- Introduced by: Bryan Kirkwood
- Spin-off appearances: Hollyoaks Later (2020)
In-universe information
- Other names: Chanelle
- Occupation: Barmaid; cleaner
- Family: McQueen
- Father: Vinnie Bletcher
- Mother: Breda McQueen
- Brothers: Sylver McQueen (adoptive)
- Sons: Prince McQueen; Hunter McQueen
- Grandsons: Theo Anderson
- Grandmothers: Marguerite McQueen
- Uncles: Victor McQueen
- Nieces: Cher Winters (adoptive)
- First cousins: Bart McQueen
- Other relatives: Marlena McQueen; Myra McQueen; Jacqui McQueen; Mercedes McQueen; John Paul McQueen; Porsche McQueen; Celine McQueen; Cleo McQueen; Theresa McQueen; Bobby Costello; Max McQueen; Matthew McQueen

Goldine "Goldie" McQueen, played by Chelsee Healey, made her first on screen appearance on 9 November 2016. Goldie was introduced as a new member of the McQueen family. Healey had previously been announced to be joining the show on 16 July 2016, when she confirmed the news on social media and was spotted reading through a script on the show's set, but details of her character were not announced until 26 July 2016. Of her casting, Healey said, "I am absolutely thrilled to join Hollyoaks. I've grown up watching it so to be in it is unbelievable. It was an irresistible opportunity, especially to play this character.". On 20 January 2026 it was announced that Healey had quit her role as Goldie and would be departing later in the year.

It was confirmed that Goldie would be joined by her 15-year-old twin sons, Prince (Malique Thompson-Dwyer) and Hunter (Theo Graham). Goldie and her sons arrive in search of their "posh and distant relatives" Myra (Nicole Barber-Lane), Mercedes (Jennifer Metcalfe) and John Paul (James Sutton), who are not pleased by their arrival. Goldie was billed as a "tough, gobby and absolutely shameless [...] good old-fashioned McQueen" that would "never back down in a fight" and always get involved in a scam to earn quick money. A show spokesperson said that Goldie would arrive in the village "in the hope of mooching off the family she's scarcely had anything to do with", but that the only thing she cares about more than money is her children, who she had when she was a teenager. Healey expressed her disbelief at playing a mother, but stated that Thompson-Dwyer and Graham were "fantastic to work with" and that all three were "delighted" by the new family unit. She also compared the wardrobe to her younger self's wardrobe.

Healey's pregnancy and temporary departure from the series was announced on 21 January 2017. Show producers created storylines to allow Healey absence from the show, but promised "plenty of drama" for Goldie before she leaves. The character departed on 4 July 2017 after deciding to take the blame for a robbery that Prince committed, before escaping court and fleeing the village. Healey departed alongside Metcalfe, who also took maternity leave from her role as Mercedes. Goldie returned in February 2018 for two episodes and full-time in March. in 2024 Healey took another materinty leave in February and returned for two episodes In June and she returned on 24 June 2025. . In August 2017, Healey was longlisted for Funniest Female at the Inside Soap Awards. She did not progress to the viewer-voted shortlist.

Goldie arrives in Hollyoaks, but Myra is against letting her stay because she is troublesome. When she is kicked out, she brings Prince and Hunter to the village and Myra allows them to move in with her. Goldie and the McQueens are devastated when relative Celine McQueen (Sarah George) goes missing and this draws Goldie and Celine's boyfriend Jesse Donovan (Luke Jerdy) closer. They kiss but agree to remain friends. The McQueens are devastated when Celine is later found dead after being murdered by Cameron Campbell (Cameron Moore). Goldie videos Mercedes and Ryan Knight (Duncan James) kissing, and uses this to blackmail Ryan to not charge Prince and Hunter for stealing Harry Thompson (Parry Glasspool) engagement ring. Mercedes finds out and forces Goldie to delete it, she does but restores the video. Goldie uses this to blackmail Ryan. Her cousin, John Paul, discovers the video. Goldie is surprised when her ex-boyfriend and Prince and Hunter's father, Shane Sweeney (Lanre Malaolu/Michael Salami) arrives in the village, having been released from prison. Shane reveals he and Goldie met when she worked as a stripper and announces his intentions to reconcile with his sons and Goldie, and she accepts.

== Tabitha Maxwell-Brown ==
Tabitha Maxwell-Brown
- Hollyoaks character
- Portrayed by: Linda Gray
- Duration: 2016−2017
- First appearance: 15 November 2016
- Last appearance: 28 February 2017
- Introduced by: Bryan Kirkwood
In-universe information
- Daughters: Marnie Nightingale
- Grandsons: James Nightingale; Nathan Nightingale; Alfie Nightingale (adoptive)
- Granddaughters: Ellie Nightingale

Tabitha "Tabby" Maxwell-Brown, played by Linda Gray, made her first on screen appearance on 15 November 2016. She is the mother of Marnie Nightingale (Lysette Anthony) and appeared for a guest stint in November 2016. The character was reintroduced for a longer stint in early 2017.

The character and casting was announced on 17 August 2016. Gray previously played Sue Ellen Ewing in the American soap Dallas. Tabitha "whips up a storm just like Sue Ellen did" when she arrives, following the death of her husband, and is said to have "fierce and affectionate bond" with Marnie, although she will not be a fan of her ex-husband, Mac Nightingale (David Easter). Executive producer, Bryan Kirkwood, decided to cast Gray after watching episodes of Dallas with his husband. On her casting, Gray said, "I love England, I read the script, she's feisty, I love the feisty ones. My motto is 'choose wisely' - and I think I've chosen wisely." Gray signed up to appear in the show for an initial one-week run. Daniel Kilkelly from Digital Spy described the character as having many stories of her "fabulous lifestyle" but is actually "lonely and harbours hurt feelings" because she is now so distant from the rest of her family. Kilkelly described Gray's casting as "Soapland's casting coup of the year". Gray began filming on 17 September 2016.

Kirkwood said in October 2016 that he would like Gray to join the show on a more permanent basis and revealed that the show and Gray had had conversations on her returning. He said, "The conversations are continuing and she feels like a really natural member of the Nightingale family. If you look at the linear between her, Marnie and Ellie - all three of them are all stunning women and I believe in it. I believe she is part of that family." On 14 December 2016, it was announced that Gray would return to the cast as a semi-regular character. A show spokesperson said, "Everyone loved having Linda around last year and we can't wait to see her back. She's due back on set in Liverpool next week and is looking forward to working with her on-screen family again." Gray returned to filming on 10 January 2017 and was later spotted filming an unknown family member's funeral.

== Prince McQueen ==
Prince McQueen
- Hollyoaks character
- Portrayed by: Malique Thompson-Dwyer
- Duration: 2016–2019, 2021–present
- First appearance: Episode 4519; 17 November 2016
- Introduced by: Bryan Kirkwood (2016); Lucy Allan (2021)
In-universe information
- Occupation: Student; Drug dealer Window Cleaner; Waiter
- Family: McQueen
- Father: Shane Sweeney
- Mother: Goldie McQueen
- Brothers: Hunter McQueen
- Wife: Lily Drinkwell (2018–2019); Olivia Bradshaw (2022–2023)
- Sons: Theo Anderson
- Grandmothers: Breda McQueen
- Uncles: Sylver McQueen (adoptive)
- First cousins: Cher Winters (adoptive)
- Other relatives: Marlena McQueen; Myra McQueen; Mercedes McQueen; John Paul McQueen; Theresa McQueen; Carmina McQueen; Porsche McQueen; Celine McQueen; Cleo McQueen; Bart McQueen; Bobby Costello; Max McQueen; Matthew McQueen

Prince McQueen, played by Malique Thompson-Dwyer, made his first on screen appearance on 17 November 2016 as the son of Goldie McQueen (Chelsee Healey).

The character and casting was announced on 26 July 2016 alongside that of his mother Goldie and twin brother Hunter (Theo Graham). Prince was described as a "cocky and swaggering" 15-year old who has "confidence in spades and more front than Blackpool". He was billed as having "a rebellious and adventurous spirit" causing him to "live in the moment", but also has trouble "listening to authority", something that Sophie Dainty of Digital Spy described as "a trait that seems to run in the McQueen family." Healey said that she, Thompson-Dwyer and Graham were overjoyed by their family unit. Lily Drinkwell (Lauren McQueen) was introduced as a new love interest for Prince in January 2017. McQueen commented that Lily and Prince were total opposites and that no one would think to put them together. In August 2017, Thompson-Dwyer and McQueen were longlisted for Best Partnership at the Inside Soap Awards. They did not progress to the viewer-voted shortlist. It was announced in June 2019 that Prince would be leaving the series in summer 2019. In June 2021, Thompson-Dwyer posted a photo to his Instagram account from the Hollyoaks set; a day later, it was announced that he would be reprising his role as Prince. His return aired on 7 September 2021.

In March 2018, Prince and Lily got married, despite Lily's aunt Diane Hutchinson (Alex Fletcher) and Prince's father Shane Sweeney (Michael Salami) attempting to stop the wedding from taking place. They move into the flat above Price Slice. They eventually argue about money and heating. In 2019, Lily dies from sepsis and Prince leaves the village months later.

== Hunter McQueen ==
Hunter McQueen
- Hollyoaks character
- Portrayed by: Theo Graham
- Duration: 2016–2018, 2022–2024
- First appearance: Episode 4519; 17 November 2016
- Last appearance: Episode 6370; 8 May 2024
- Introduced by: Bryan Kirkwood (2016); Lucy Allan (2022)
In-universe information
- Occupation: Student
- Family: McQueen
- Father: Shane Sweeney
- Mother: Goldie McQueen
- Brothers: Prince McQueen
- Grandmothers: Breda McQueen
- Uncles: Sylver McQueen (adoptive)
- Nephews: Theo Anderson
- First cousins: Cher Winters (adoptive)
- Other relatives: Marlena McQueen; Myra McQueen; Mercedes McQueen; John Paul McQueen; Carmina McQueen; Porsche McQueen; Celine McQueen; Cleo McQueen; Theresa McQueen; Bart McQueen; Bobby Costello; Max McQueen; Matthew McQueen

Hunter McQueen, played by Theo Graham, made his first on screen appearance on 17 November 2016 as the son of Goldie McQueen (Chelsee Healey). The character and casting was announced on 26 July 2016 alongside that of his mother Goldie and twin brother Prince (Malique Thompson-Dwyer). Hunter was billed as the "more sensitive twin" who believes himself to be a graffiti artist. He is a "creative and free spirited" 15-year old who "tries his best to stay out of trouble", something "easier said than done" due to Prince's rebellious nature. Healey said that she, Thompson-Dwyer and Graham were "delighted" by their "new family unit". In August 2017, Graham was longlisted for "Best Newcomer" at the Inside Soap Awards. He did not progress to the viewer-voted shortlist.

On 2 October 2018, Graham made an unannounced departure from the show. It was confirmed in October 2022 that Hunter would return later in the year. Hunter's return aired on 28 December 2022.

On 17 April 2024, it was announced that Hunter would be killed-off later in the year, following Graham's decision to leave the role once again. Hunter's death aired on 8 May 2024, after taking impure drugs supplied by Warren Fox (Jamie Lomas).

Hunter arrived in the village along with Goldie and Prince. He dislikes his father Shane Sweeney (Lanre Malaolu/Michael Salami) as he arrives and breaks Goldie's heart. He orders Shane to leave and never come back. This causes Goldie and Prince to get angry at Hunter. Hunter is caught spray painting by Neeta Kaur (Amrit Maghera) and they have a heart to heart and she assures Hunter that he has done the right thing. He secretly develops a crush on Neeta and sleep together, although she was drunk. She gets back with Mac Nightingale (David Easter) to lose her forbidden crush which causes Hunter to get upset and does his best to split up both of them. He sees Mac's dark side when he attacks Harry Thompson (Parry Glasspool) but is stopped by Mac's son, James Nightingale (Gregory Finnegan). Hunter tells Neeta this but she doesn't believe him despite being hurt by him in the past. Hunter joins his friends in Ibiza and gets jealous when Neeta flirts with Brody Hudson (Adam Woodward), promoting him to push Brody into the swimming pool. Hunter nearly exposes his feelings towards Neeta in front of everyone. This annoys Neeta and calls him creepy which causes Hunter to be embarrassed and walk away. Hunter forgives Neeta but is confused about why Neeta keeps shutting him out and is with Mac and expresses how much he loves her.

At this point, Neeta secretly has feelings for Hunter but does not want to hurt Mac and ruin her and Hunter's future. Both of them have a heart to heart which Hunter express his feelings towards Neeta which causes her to fall for Hunter and have sex. The following day, they continue her affair until they are caught by Brody which forces Neeta to end their affair as teacher/student relationship is illegal. Hunter becomes jealous of Neeta and Mac and decides to make her jealous and he succeeds when he kisses Peri Lomax (Ruby O'Donnell) while Neeta watches on, despite actually loving Neeta. Because of this, Neeta reveals her love for Hunter and not Mac. Their affair is finally exposed to Mac when he finds out she drove his car away with Hunter and their messages confirmed it. Neeta is blackmailed into staying with Mac and ending her relationship with Hunter or else he will tell the police about her illegal relationship. Hunter is heartbroken and tries his best to get back with her although he is left broken again when she tells him their relationship meant nothing. Hunter finds out Neeta is being blackmailed by Mac and does his best to get her away from him but it results in Hunter being beaten by Mac and Neeta being locked in the bathroom. Hunter fears Mac and ends things with Neeta. Weeks later he regrets it and tries his best to get back with Neeta but her affair is finally exposed. When the school explosion happens, Hunter shouts to Neeta he loves her to which Neeta responds, Mac gets jealous and kills Neeta, causing her to fall. Hunter is devastated over Neeta's death and vows to get revenge. When he finds out the Mac nearly killed Jack Osborne (Jimmy McKenna) and attacked headteacher Sally St. Claire (Annie Wallace), he goes round to the pub and finds Mac sleeping and attempts to kill him but is stopped by Sally and Prince, saying Neeta wouldn't want this.

The following year, Hunter has anxiety because of Neeta's death and goes to visit Mac as Goldie's brother, Sylver McQueen (David Tag) tells him to. Around this time, he spots Carl Costello's (Paul Opacic) deceased body but no one believes him. He forgives Mac and tells him how Neeta loves him but not Mac. This promotes Mac to grab onto Hunter's arm which shocks Hunter and tells him to do it again until he is stopped by Neeta's sister, Asha Kaur (Rukku Nahar). They begin their friendship, and they deal with Neeta's death, and they become a couple and he leaves for a couple of weeks with her to Brighton. Hunter and Asha return and are shocked to see Mac in a scooter, when Mac actually made a full recovery and is faking not being able to walk. Hunter is given pills by Mac which he takes and goes to kill Mac and tells him to tell the truth. He is stopped by Asha and Prince but Asha breaks up with Hunter which delights Mac as his plan worked.

Thanks to Mac's grandson Romeo Quinn (Owen Warner), Asha waits for Hunter as he chases after her and begs her for another chance. She accepts and he tells Prince to back his bag as he is leaving for good. As Asha and Hunter are walking, they spot Mac who is shocked to see them two together again and Hunter tells Mac that he is nothing and will never find loved. This promotes Mac to get angry as Asha tells Mac he is jealous and they walk away. Hunter and Asha say their emotional goodbye to the McQueens and they depart as they drove off in a cab heading to their new lives in Brighton permanently. A year later, Prince leaves the village and goes to stay with Hunter and Asha, it is assumed that Prince told them about Mac's death.

== Dr. Barton ==
Dr. Barton, played by Amanda Muggleton, made her appearance on 13 December 2016. The character and casting was announced on 9 December 2016.

Dr. Barton is the doctor that Darren Osborne (Ashley Taylor Dawson) takes his wife Nancy Osborne (Jessica Fox) to after she begins to feel unwell after they suspect that she is suffering from multiple sclerosis.

== Daniel Lomax ==
Daniel Lomax
- Hollyoaks character
- Portrayed by: Beau Bell (2017); Kyzo-drè Murphy (2017–present)
- Duration: 2016–2020, 2023–present
- First appearance: Episode 4545; 23 December 2016
- Introduced by: Bryan Kirkwood
In-universe information
- Father: Louis Loveday
- Mother: Leela Lomax
- Stepfather: Cameron Campbell; Joel Dexter
- Half-brothers: Zack Loveday; Noah Dexter; Sid Sumner (adoptive)
- Half-sisters: Lisa Loveday; Peri Lomax; Clara Dexter
- Uncles: Ste Hay
- Aunts: Tegan Lomax
- Nieces: Steph Cunningham-Lomax
- First cousins: Lucas Hay; Hannah Hay-O'Connor; Leah Barnes (adoptive); Rose Lomax (adoptive); Dee Dee Hutchinson

Daniel Lomax, made his first on-screen appearance on 23 December 2016 as the son of Leela Lomax (Kirsty-Leigh Porter) and Louis Loveday (Karl Collins) and was named after Leela's deceased father Danny Lomax. Daniel is born two months premature after Leela goes into labour at her wedding to Cameron Campbell (Cameron Moore). Daniel has breathing difficulties, so he has to stay in the specialist baby care unit. There, it is discovered Daniel has a mongolian spot birthmark meaning Cameron is not his father. When Cameron discovers this, he forces Leela to choose between him and Daniel, and Leela chooses Daniel. Cameron believes Louis' son Zack Loveday (Duayne Boachie) is Daniel's father, but Louis later arrives at the hospital to meet Daniel. Louis gets involved in an affair with his ex-wife Simone Loveday (Jacqueline Boatswain), marrying Simone's sister Martine Deveraux (Kéllé Bryan) whilst away working and engaged to Leela. Everyone finds out Louis's deceit on his and Leela's wedding day and on that night Breda McQueen (Moya Brady) kidnaps Louis and she murders him as part of her "bad dads" scheme only for Mac Nightingale (David Easter) to blackmail her over Louis' death.

== Other characters ==
| Character | Date(s) | Actor | Details |
|---|---|---|---|
| Sapphire | 19 February | Susie Mandleberg | A stripper who Robbie Roscoe (Charlie Wernham) hires for his brother Jason Roscoe's (Alfie Browne-Sykes) stag party. Robbie later kisses Sapphire, making Holly Cunningham (Amanda Clapham) jealous. |
| Niamh | 29 February | Sophie Giddens | A cancer patient suffering from a brain tumour who Jade Albright (Kassius Nelson) meets. She helps lifts Jade's spirits up about cancer, but later confides in Jade, Jack Osborne (Jimmy McKenna), Darren Osborne (Ashley Taylor Dawson) and Nancy Osborne (Jessica Fox) that she has been told that her treatment isn't working. |
| Jake | 14 March | Matthew James-Bailey | A man who goes on a date with John Paul McQueen (James Sutton). He visits John Paul at his workplace, whilst John Paul is installing an antivirus program onto the school's laptops. Jake asks John Paul to go get some sugars for the coffees that he has made, and whilst John Paul is gone he steals all of the school's laptops. |
| Police Officer | 29 March–28 June | David Wills | A police officer who breathalyzes Cleo McQueen (Nadine Rose Mulkerrin) after a car accident caused by Holly Cunningham (Amanda Clapham) in which Rachel Hardy (Jennifer Brooke) is killed. After it was revealed that Holly was driving the car he interviewed her over the accident, until James Nightingale (Gregory Finnegan) intervened. |
| News Anchor | 7 April | Emma Redman | A news anchor who reports on the hospital murder by Lindsey Roscoe (Sophie Austin). She also mentions two of the people whom Lindsey was suspected of trying to murder. |
| News Reporter | 7 April | Ross Grant | A news reporter who reports on the hospital murders by Lindsey Roscoe (Sophie Austin) outside of the Dee Valley Hospital. |
| Janet Cardsley | 13 April–5 August | Ruth Evans | Joanne Cardsley's (Rachel Leskovac) mother who has Alzheimer's disease. Joanne later visits her in hospital, accompanied by James Nightingale (Gregory Finnegan), who poses as her husband. Janet dies shortly afterwards. |
| Journalist | 2 May | Chris Barlow | A journalist who arrives in the village looking for the Lovedays, but instead becomes interested in Joe Roscoe (Ayden Callaghan) after realising he is the husband of serial killer Lindsey Roscoe (Sophie Austin). He fails to get an interview and later tries again, before Joe threatens him. The journalist leaves threatening consequences. |
| PCSO Rocco | 16 May | David Tag | A police community support officer who is guarding the Roscoes from Lindsey Roscoe (Sophie Austin). He flirts with both Mercedes McQueen (Jennifer Metcalfe) and Celine McQueen (Sarah George) and accompanies them to a house party. |
| Vicar | 25 May | Joe Standerline | A vicar who marries Trevor Royle (Greg Wood) and Grace Black (Tamara Wall), before Trevor dies at the altar after being stabbed by Nico Blake (Persephone Swales-Dawson). |
| Molly Ravenwood | 1 June | Angela Murray | An investigator from Consumer Affairs who investigates Savage's Emporium after Simone Loveday (Jacqueline Boatswain) reports them for selling fake designer handbags. Cindy Savage (Stephanie Waring) is able to convince Molly otherwise by showing her real designer handbags that people had previously brought for her. |
| Pupil | 6 June | Oliver Sheard | A pupil who reads a self-written poem in the Hollyoaks High talent competition. |
| Victoria | 9 June | Alison Darling | A social worker sent to the hospital after she hears that Freddie Roscoe (Charlie Clapham) has not been visiting Kimberley. Joe Roscoe (Ayden Callaghan) and Mercedes McQueen (Jennifer Metcalfe) try and convince her that Freddie is ready for parenthood, but when Freddie he arrives he rejects Kimberley in front of all of them. |
| Counsellor | 14 June | Sally Bankes | A counsellor for Trevor Royle (Greg Wood) after he is diagnosed with PTSD. Grace Black (Tamara Wall) and Esther Bloom (Jazmine Franks) visit her after Trevor's death because Grace believes that they were having an affair, but she realises that she was wrong after discovering that the counsellor had no contact with Trevor outside of his sessions. |
| Vicar | 14 June | Philip Boradbent | A vicar who christens Alexandra Roscoe. |
| D.C. Richards | 21 June | Adam Jowett | A police officer who arrests Sally St. Claire (Annie Wallace) for aggravated assault. He later questions her. |
| Mr Malcolm Sheffield | 24 June | Christopher Villiers | A restaurant owner who interviews Tony (Nick Pickard) and Diane Hutchinson (Alex Fletcher) for a job in France. He gives them the position, but it is later revealed that he was only offering them the job due to him owing Marnie Nightingale (Lysette Anthony) a favour. |
| Court Clerk | 27–29 June | Darren Kemp | A court clerk present at the trial of Pete Buchanan (Kai Owen) for sexually abusing Cleo McQueen (Nadine Mulkerrin). He asks the jury for their verdict at the end of the trial. |
| Miss Dobson | 27–29 June | Tnia Miller | Pete Buchanan's (Kai Owen) defence barrister at his trial. She questions Cleo McQueen (Nadine Rose Mulkerrin) about her relationship with Pete, and forces her to admit that Holly Cunningham (Amanda Clapham) was driving the car that killed Rachel Hardy (Jennifer Brooke) and not Cleo. She cross-references the testimonies of Harry Thompson (Parry Glasspool), Jade Albright (Kassius Nelson), Celine McQueen (Sarah George) and Reenie McQueen (Zöe Lucker). She questions Pete about his relationship with Cleo and Reenie. |
| Mr Philips | 27–29 June | Rob Heaps | The prosecuting barrister at the trial of Pete Buchanan (Kai Owen). He interviews Harry Thompson (Parry Glasspool), Jade Albright (Kassius Nelson), Celine McQueen (Sarah George) and Reenie McQueen (Zöe Lucker). He questions Pete about his relationship with Cleo and questions Cleo about the secret email account that her and Pete shared. |
| Judge Tipp | 27–29 June | Philippa Howell | The judge who presides over the trial of Pete Buchanan (Kai Owen). After Pete was found guilty of sexual grooming and sexual relations with a child she sent him for pre-sentence reports. |
| Carter | 30 June–1 July | Amron Adams | A lawyer and former boyfriend of James Nightingale (Gregory Finnegan). He invites James to lunch with his partner, Lara (Hannah Warren-Green) and James attends with John Paul McQueen (James Sutton) pretending to be his boyfriend. He also interviews Joanne Cardsley (Rachel Leskovac) for the position. |
| Lara | 30 June | Hannah Warren-Green | Carter's (Amron Adams) girlfriend and she attends his lunch with James Nightingale (Gregory Finnegan) and John Paul McQueen (James Sutton), where she complains that her scallops are overcooked. |
| Babysitter | 15 July | Michaela Longden | A babysitter who agrees to look after Curtis Royle for Esther Bloom (Jazmine Franks) and Grace Black (Tamara Wall). |
| Police Officer | 1 August | Abi Uttley | A police officer who arrests Mac Nightingale (David Easter) for assaulting Neeta Kaur (Amrit Maghera). |
| Marco | 3 August | Andrew Squires | A drug dealer who meets with Mercedes McQueen (Jennifer Metcalfe) to complete Maria's (Fernanda Dinez) drug deal. Marco cancels the deal after he discovers that not all the drugs are present. |
| Registrar | 4 August 2016-22 January 2018 | Kate England | A registrar who marries Esther Bloom (Jazmine Franks) and Kim Butterfield (Daisy Wood-Davis). She leaves the wedding reception after Jesse Donovan (Luke Jerdy) starts hitting on her. She also marries Cameron Campbell (Cameron Moore) and Leela Roscoe (Kirsty-Leigh Porter); and Luke Morgan (Gary Lucy) and Mandy Richardson (Sarah Jayne Dunn). |
| Shop Owner | 9 August | Claire Fox | A shop owner who refuses to let Myra McQueen (Nicole Barber-Lane), Mercedes McQueen (Jennifer Metcalfe) and Celine McQueen (Sarah George) into her shop because she was closing. Due to some comments she made about their appearance, Myra and Mercedes decide to rob the store. |
| Doctor | 18 August | Amy Popplewell | A doctor who treats John Paul McQueen (James Sutton) after he is accidentally run over by Nancy Osborne (Jessica Fox). After John Paul awakens from his comatose state she takes him for a CT scan. |
| Father Dan | 26 August 2016-13 September 2018 | Joe Standerline | A priest who visits Joe Roscoe (Ayden Callaghan) and Mercedes McQueen (Jennifer Metcalfe) to discuss their upcoming wedding. He decides against it after discovering about Mercedes' previous marriages, but she implores him to reconsider. However, before he can Mercedes is arrested. Father Dan is later called to bless Mercedes and Russ Owen's (Stuart Manning) wedding. |
| Police Officer | 26 August | Myles Keogh | A police officer who arrests Mercedes McQueen (Jennifer Metcalfe) for drug-dealing. He puts Mercedes into a police line-up and refuses to allow her fiancé, Joe Roscoe (Ayden Callaghan), to talk to her. |
| Helen Sharman | 31 August | Herself | An astronaut who talks to Alfie Nightingale (Richard Linnell) about the comet he may have discovered. Although she believes that it is not a new discovery she encourages him not to give up on his dreams. |
| Simon Pearson | 15 September | Tom Lorcan | A solicitor who specializes in family cases who James Nightingale (Gregory Finnegan) approaches to open up a historic abuse allegation against his father, Mac Nightingale (David Easter). Although no proof could be used in a court, Simon advises James to talk to his siblings to see if they were also abused. |
| Gloria | 16 September | Leanne Rowley | A television presenter who arrives to interview Myra McQueen (Nicole Barber-Lane) about her octuplets, unaware that is actually a scam. However, she finds out when testing Jesse Donovan's (Luke Jerdy) microphone and overhears him and Celine McQueen (Sarah George) discussing it. |
| Vicar | 29-30 September | John Gully | A vicar at the double wedding of Joe Roscoe (Ayden Callaghan) and Mercedes McQueen (Jennifer Metcalfe) and Diego Salvador Martinez Hernandez De La Cruz (Juan Pablo Yepez) and Celine McQueen (Sarah George). |
| Cassandra Evans | 30 September-15 November | Eva Magyar | One of Diego Salvador Martinez Hernandez De La Cruz's (Juan Pablo Yepez) ex-wives, who he conned out of all her money. When Myra McQueen (Nicole Barber-Lane) goes to visit Diego in prison, Cassandra reveals everything about her past with Diego to her. Myra later pays another visit to prison, hoping to reconcile with Diego, but she changes her mind after seeing Cassandra there with him. When Myra decides she wants Diego back, she convinces James Nightingale (Gregory Finnegan) to help her. James gets Myra to steal Cassandra's phone and he discovers that she has been drinking when she promised a court that she should stop, James then blackmails her to drop the case. |
| Lionel | 4–25 October | Wil Johnson | Jade (Kassius Nelson) and Sonia Albright's (Kiza Deen) father, who Jade and Sonia go to visit after Jade is told that her second round of chemotherapy hasn't worked. After seeing him with his new family, Jade decides that she can't go through with it and she returns to the Osbornes. Lionel later visits the village, and learns from Sonia that Jade has died from cancer. Lionel attends the funeral, and at the wake asks Sonia to come live with him and his family in Belgium. She later takes him up on his offer and joins him. |
| Sonographer | 17 October 2016–1 June 2017 | Amy Searles | A sonographer who scans Maxine Minniver (Nikki Sanderson) after she collapses. She tells Maxine, Warren Fox (Jamie Lomas) and Adam Donovan (Jimmy Essex) that Maxine has miscarried her baby. She later performs a scan on Sienna Blake (Anna Passey), and confirms that her twins are still alive. |
| Pedro | 25 October | Andreas Muñoz | A man who Myra McQueen (Nicole Barber-Lane) goes on a date with in a bid to get over Diego Salvador Martinez Hernandez De La Cruz (Juan Pablo Yepez). |
| Chico | 26-27 October | Josh Bradshaw | A prostitute that James Nightingale (Gregory Finnegan) brings home to spite John Paul McQueen (James Sutton) after he tells his brother Nathan Nightingale (Jared Garfield) about their father Mac Nightingale (David Easter) abusing him as a child. Although James doesn't sleep with him, he hires him as a pretend therapist to fool John Paul into believing that he is attending counselling. |
| District Judge | 24 November | Christine Mackie | A district judge at the custody hearing of Leah Barnes (Ela-May Demircan) and Lucas Hay (William Hall). She awards full custody to Amy Barnes (Ashley Slanina-Davies) and Ryan Knight (Duncan James) and only allows Ste Hay (Kieron Richardson) to see them under supervision. |
| Solicitor | 24 November | Cassie Vallance | A solicitor who represents Amy Barnes (Ashley Slanina-Davies) and Ryan Knight (Duncan James) in the custody hearing for Leah Barnes (Ela-May Demircan) and Lucas Hay (William Hall). |
| DS Roxy Cassidy | 28 November−1 December 2016, 28 August 2017−15 November 2018 | Lizzie Stavrou | Roxy is an undercover police officer who DS Ryan Knight (Duncan James) visits. Ste Hay (Kieron Richardson) and Warren Fox (Jamie Lomas) mistake her for a prostitute and try to get her to help them frame Ryan, but she refuses. Roxy's identity is revealed when Warren is arrested under suspicision for being a pimp. The following year, she returns and executes a search warrant at the Osbornes' house after Darren Osborne (Ashley Taylor Dawson) admits to dealing heroin. Roxy tells Darren that even though he assisted the police in catching some of Shane Sweeney's (Michael Salami) associates, he would still face charges for dealing drugs. She later questions Grace Black (Tamara Wall) and Tracey Donovan (Lisa Maxwell) after Warren is stabbed. When Tracey's body is found in the lake, Roxy investigates and questions both Lisa Loveday (Rachel Adedeji) and Darcy Wilde (Aisling Jarrett-Gavin). She later informs Adam Donovan (Jimmy Essex) that Tracey's death has been ruled as an accident. She later interviews Nancy Osborne (Jessica Fox) when her credit card is found in Mark Gibbs's (Colin Parry) house after Luke Morgan (Gary Lucy) wrecked it. Both Luke and Nancy cover for each other, and Roxy takes Nancy to the police station to make a formal statement. Roxy begins working with Adam to convict his father, Glenn Donovan (Bob Cryer). Following the death of D.S. Geoff Thorpe (James Bradshaw), Roxy is assigned to his cases, including the murder of Amy Barnes (Ashley Slanina-Davies). Her colleague and Amy's husband, Ryan Knight, is revealed to be the murderer and Roxy leads the manhunt for him. In his interview, Ryan pretends to be mentally unwell, but Roxy and clinical psychologist, Farrah Maalik (Krupa Pattani), see right through him. Ryan then reveals he killed Farrah's girlfriend, Kim Butterfield (Daisy Wood-Davis), though Kim is actually alive and being held hostage in the basement of Hollyoaks High. Ryan offers to give the location of Kim's body in exchange for a deal, but Roxy is reluctant to give in to his demands. Roxy grows increasingly close to Adam and they end up having sex. |
| P.C. Harvey | 16 December 2016–25 May 2017 | Lucy Lowe | A police officer who arrests and questions Ellie Nightingale (Sophie Porley) for assaulting Nick Savage (Ben-Ryan Davies). After she learns that Nick isn't pressing charges she releases Ellie, but when she senses something is up with her, she implores Ellie to tell someone. She also questions Prince McQueen (Malique Thompson-Dwyer) over his involvement in a car crash. She also questions, and later charges him over stealing cameras from Hollyoaks High School. |
| Dr. Smith | 23 December | Naomi Yichen Christie | A doctor who delivers Leela Campbell's (Kirsty-Leigh Porter) baby son. Due to the fact that Daniel is two months premature, and not breathing properly she has him taken to a special unit. Cameron Campbell (Cameron Moore) later notices what he presumes to be a bruise on Daniel's leg, and confronts Dr. Smith over it, when Cameron is gone, she confirms to Tegan Lomax (Jessica Ellis) that it is a mongolian spot. |
| Barman | 23 December | Nathan Wright | A barman who stops Warren Fox (Jamie Lomas) from finding Joel Dexter (Rory Douglas-Speed), by pretending that he isn't at the bar. When Warren leaves, the barman questions Joel about him. |
| P.C. McCrimmon | 30 December | Bil Stuart | A police officer who questions a young Jack Osborne (Ben Ewing), getting him to reveal that a young Billy Brodie (Rian Gordon) was the person responsible for the death of Callum Alexander (Robbie Millar). |
| Aggie Osborne | 30 December | Helen Mallon | The mother of Jack Osborne (Ben Ewing) and Billy Brodie (Rian Gordon). She tells her sons not to go out on New Year's Eve, but they ignore her. |
| Callum Alexander | 30 December | Robbie Millar | A teenager who wronged a young Billy Brodie (Rian Gordon), causing him to beat him to near-death. Billy then convinces his younger half-brother Jack Osborne (Ben Ewing) to get involved and he accidentally deals the killing blow by kicking Callum in the head. |
| Young Billy | 30 December | Rian Gordon | A younger version of Billy Brodie (Clive Russell), seen in flashback, who beats Callum Alexander (Robbie Millar) to near-death, before having his half-brother Jack Osborne (Ben Ewing) to deal the finishing blow. He is subsequently arrested when Jack tells P.C. McCrimmon (Bil Stuart) that Billy killed him. |
| Young Jack | 30 December | Ben Ewing | A younger version of Jack Osborne (Jimmy McKenna), seen in flashback who accompanies his half-brother, Billy Brodie (Rian Gordon) on New Year's Eve. Young Jack subsequently accidentally deals the killing blow to Callum Alexander (Robbie Millar). Young Jack later tells P.C. McCrimmon (Bil Stuart) that Billy is wholly responsible for killing Callum, leading to his arrest. |
