= Theo Graham =

British actor (born 1997)

- Born: Theo Farris Lee Graham; 20 June 1997 (age 28); Manchester, England
- Occupation: Actor
- Years active: 2014–present

Theo Farris Lee Graham (born 20 June 1997) is an English actor. He gained prominence through his role as Hunter McQueen in the E4 soap opera Hollyoaks (2016–2018, 2022–2024), which earned him an award and a nomination at The British Soap Awards.

== Early life and education ==
Graham is from Manchester. He first attended Corpus Christie with St Anne's Roman Catholic Primary School in Ancoats, now named St Anne's, followed by St Peter's Roman Catholic High School and then pursued a BTEC Extended Diploma in Performing Arts at The Manchester College.

== Career ==
Graham first appeared in the BBC One soap opera Doctors as Wade Benton in a 2015 episode. He then returned in 2016 for a five-episode arc as Barney Turner. Graham starred as Hunter McQueen in the E4 soap opera Hollyoaks from 2016 to 2018. For his performance, he won Best On-Screen Partnership at the 2018 British Soap Awards alongside Malique Thompson-Dwyer, as well as earning a nomination for Best Actor.

Graham had recurring and supporting roles in the 2016 ITV miniseries Brief Encounters and the 2019 5Star series Clink. In 2021, Graham played Zak in the second season of the BBC comedy-drama Flatmates and starred as Dane in first season the Netflix teen fantasy series Fate: The Winx Saga. He returned for Fate's second season, this time in a recurring role. On 17 October 2022, it was announced that Graham would reprise his role in Hollyoaks.

== Filmography ==
Year	Title	Role	Notes
2014	All at Sea	Brad	Episode: "Wreath"
2015	Ordinary Lies	Young Lad	1 episode
2015	The Hunter	Gary	Short film
2015–2016	Doctors	Wade Benton / Barney Turner	6 episodes
2016	Brief Encounters	Richie	
2016–2018, 2022–2024	Hollyoaks	Hunter McQueen	Regular role
2017	In the Dark	Kid 1	Miniseries; 1 episode
2019	Clink	P.O. Caleb Williams	3 episodes
2021	Flatmates	Zak	Recurring role; 4 episodes
2021–2022	Fate: The Winx Saga	Dane	13 episodes

== Awards and nominations ==
Year	Award	Category	Work	Result	Ref.
2018	The British Soap Awards	Best Actor	Hollyoaks	Nominated	
2018	The British Soap Awards	Best On-Screen Partnership	Hollyoaks	Won	
