= Rian Gordon =

Scottish actor

- Born: 29 August 1997 (age 28); Irvine, North Ayrshire, Scotland
- Occupation: Actor

Rian John Gordon is a Scottish actor best known for his role as Conor Brodie in River City and Young Jerome in Silent Witness.

== Career ==
Gordon played the role as Conor Brodie on the BBC Scotland soap opera River City from 12 October 2010 to 2013. He returned to the role in January 2024.

== Filmography ==
Year	Title	Role	Notes	Refs.
2010–2013, 2024–2026	River City	Conor Brodie	Regular role	
2014	Silent Witness	Young Jerome	Series 17	
2014	Outlander	Innkeeper's Son	Series 1	
2016	Shadows	Shawn	Short	
2016	Hollyoaks	Young Billy Brodie	Guest role	
2017	Holby City	Russell Johnston	Series 19	
2017	Come Out of the Woods	Charlie	Short	
2017	The Rebel	Luke	Series 2	
2018	Final Score	Brandon		
2019	Get Duked!	Dean Gibson		
2022	Mayflies	Young Jimmy		
