= Pete Buchanan =

Fictional character from Hollyoaks

- Hollyoaks character
- Portrayed by: Kai Owen
- Duration: 2015–2016, 2018, 2021
- First appearance: Episode 4200; 2 June 2015
- Last appearance: Episode 5622; 29 June 2021
- Introduced by: Bryan Kirkwood (2015, 2018, 2021)
In-universe information
- Occupation: Builder
- Wife: Reenie Buchanan-McQueen (2015–2016)
- Stepdaughters: Porsche McQueen; Celine McQueen; Cleo McQueen

Pete Buchanan is a fictional character from the Channel 4 soap opera Hollyoaks, played by Kai Owen. From his debut appearance on 2 June 2015, he has been involved in the sexual abuse plot within the McQueen family. After being imprisoned for his crimes, Pete left the series on 29 June 2016. Pete returned for a one-off appearance on 12 October 2018. On 29 March 2021, it was announced that Owen would be reprising the role, with Pete returning on 6 April 2021.

== Development ==
=== Creation and characterisation ===
It was announced in April 2015 that the McQueen family were going to be centre to a sexual abuse storyline. Hollyoaks worked with the NSPCC for the storyline, who said: "we've teamed-up with Hollyoaks to highlight the most common form of child sexual abuse with the aim of assisting young victims to find help and support". The concept and name of the character was announced on 8 April 2015, where it was confirmed that Pete would be a pedophile, while additional details such as casting was announced on 10 April 2015. His profile on the Channel 4 website describes him as a handyman that is "always happy to help out". He is a "social chameleon" who can fit in wherever he goes, and can easily have a conversation with anyone that he meets. The profile states that "few people have a bad word to say about Pete", but that is part of his plan, since his "perfected Mr Nice Guy act is just a façade". It also notes that Pete is manipulative, and that after "worming his way in" to the McQueen family unit, he becomes Reenie McQueen's (Zöe Lucker) "saviour" to get close to her children. Digital Spy wrote that Pete is evil, but that he is "able to portray himself as a nice guy". Speaking of his casting, Owen told Digital Spy: "Pete is a challenging role to take on. I'm honoured to be part of this storyline and to be able to work with the NSPCC to raise awareness of child abuse to the Hollyoaks audience."

=== Returns (2018, 2021) ===
In 2018, it was announced that Pete would be returning as part of Cleo's "harrowing bulimia story". His scenes are set in prison, when Joel Dexter (Rory Douglas-Speed), the then-partner of Cleo, visits him. Douglas-Speed explained that Joel believes that Pete is "at the centre of all of Cleo's issues", which is what leads him to visit Pete. In March 2021, it was hinted that Cleo receives a "blast from the past" after she receives a call from an unknown number. When she answers the call, her reaction is "concerning" and her boyfriend Toby Faroe (Bobby Gordon) becomes worried for her. Hollyoaks producers confirmed that the storyline would see someone return to the series, whose last appearance had aired in 2018. Later that month, it was announced that Pete would act as the returnee the following month. The storyline, which revisits the mental health of both Cleo and Toby, sees Toby becomes determined to get revenge on the "evil abuser". Actor Owen confirmed that Pete's sole purpose of returning to the village was due to him believing that he could "win Cleo around once again". Speaking on his character, he said Pete is "a master manipulator, he's a nasty piece of work, and he's powerful", as well as that "he knows exactly who to target". He admitted that the role is difficult to play due to the villainous aspects of it, but felt it is important to portray Pete due to the importance of the storyline.

== Storylines ==
Pete is introduced as Reenie McQueen's (Zöe Lucker) ex-boyfriend following her release from prison. Upon his arrival in the village, Porsche McQueen (Twinnie-Lee Moore) informs her family that Pete sexually assaulted her at a young age. Porsche tells Phoebe McQueen (Mandip Gill) that one night after Reenie came home drunk, Pete sexually assaulted her. On the day of Phoebe's funeral after she is killed, it was revealed that Pete had been molesting his step daughter, Porsche's half-sister Cleo McQueen (Nadine Rose Mulkerrin) for years. Celine McQueen (Sarah George) also reveals that she suffered from sexual abuse at Pete's hands when she was young too. When Cleo refuses to continue her "relationship" with him, Pete leaves Reenie, knowing that this will cause Reenie's drinking to spiral out of control. Subsequently, Cleo begs for him to return and he does so on the understanding that she will go along with what he wants. Upon his return he proposes to Reenie, but privately tells Cleo that this is so he can be closer to Cleo. Pete grows extremely jealous of Cleo's relationship with her boyfriend, Harry, even persuading Jack Osborne (Jimmy McKenna) to rethink his decision of letting Cleo work for him during the summer. To prevent Cleo from going to see Harry, Pete has sex with Cleo. Pete does not use a condom when having sex with Cleo, and she has to go to the sexual health clinic, which infuriates Porsche. Later that evening, Reenie and Pete buy Cleo birth control pills.

Weeks later, Pete meets student Jade Albright (Kassius Nelson), who is being fostered by the Osborne family, Pete helps Jade with her schoolwork and gives her a phone so that he can start grooming her. Cleo later notices how Pete is acting with Jade and threatens to expose their relationship to Reenie. On the week of Pete and Reenie's wedding, Cleo is ready to expose her and Pete's relationship with Reenie when Pete makes Cleo believe that Reenie has terminal breast cancer. Cleo learns this is a lie, and their secret relationship is exposed to the McQueen family at Pete and Reenie’s wedding. Porsche then lets her anger out at Pete and Cleo storms off while John Paul McQueen (James Sutton) threatens to kill Pete. The next day, Jade asks Pete to give her a lift to an old foster home when she believes the Osbornes' do not want her anymore. Sonia manages to get a message to Jade about Pete being a pervert and Jade bashes a car door on him. Later, Pete is knocked down by Darren Osborne's (Ashley Taylor Dawson) taxi. The next day, it is revealed that Reenie ran Pete over and he threatens to tell the truth if she doesn't stop pushing Cleo to make a statement to the police. Later, he's threatened by Silas Blissett (Jeff Rawle) also by calling him disgusted about his sexual assault with the McQueens.

Pete spies on the McQueens, and sends Cleo a text asking to meet up, and she goes, not realising it is him. Cleo tells Pete that she doesn't want anything to do with him anymore. Pete then tries to get a job from Nathan Nightingale (Jared Garfield). Harry confronts Pete for being at the pub working and Pete pretends that Harry attacked him and Jason Roscoe arrests Harry. During the trial, Pete feigned innocence, and it begins to look as if he will go free. However, Cleo takes the stand for a second time and describes what he did to her. Pete is found guilty by the jury; as he is led away to jail, he yells abuse at the McQueen family. Pete is visited in prison by Joel, Cleo's partner. Joel is a priest who comes to confront him about the damage he has done to Cleo after he tries to contact her, after she has since developed an eating disorder. He informs Pete about Cleo's heart attack caused by her bulimia, and warns Pete to stay away from Cleo and blames Pete for Cleo's purging. Pete tells Joel that it is Joel's fault and that Cleo will be missing him. Joel beats Pete and leaves.

== Reception ==
When announcing that Pete would stand trial for his crimes, Metro described Pete as "sinister". It was said that "fans watched in horror" when Cleo kissed Pete for the first time on-screen. Metro noted that Pete had "weaved a tangled, sinister and destructive web over many months", and has called Pete "sinister and sly" in an article. Owen was longlisted for Best Actor at the Inside Soap Awards in 2016.
