= Sienna Blake =

Fictional character from Hollyoaks

- Hollyoaks character
- Portrayed by: Anna Passey
- Duration: 2012–present
- First appearance: 21 November 2012
- Introduced by: Bryan Kirkwood
- Crossover appearances: Brookside (2025)
In-universe information
- Other names: Sienna Bradley (1st married name); Sienna Williams (2nd married name)
- Occupation: Barmaid; Nanny; Receptionist; Shop assistant; Teaching assistant; Cleaner; Florist
- Father: Jeremy Blake
- Mother: Anna Blake
- Stepfather: Dirk Savage (until 2013); Patrick Blake (until 2016)
- Brothers: Dodger Savage
- Half-brothers: Will Savage
- Half-sisters: Liberty Savage
- Husband: Ben Bradley (2016–2017); Ethan Williams (2024)
- Sons: Sebastian Blake
- Daughters: Nico Blake; Sophie Blake
- Stepsons: Josh Bradley (2016-17)
- Granddaughters: Tori Devine-Banks
- Grandfathers: Charles Blake
- Grandmothers: Martha Blake
- Uncles: Patrick Blake
- Nieces: Nico Blake; Myra-Pocahontas Savage-McQueen; Faith Hudson-Savage
- First cousins: Dilly Harcourt; Minnie Minniver

Sienna Blake (previously Bradley and Williams) is a fictional character from the British Channel 4 soap opera Hollyoaks, played by Anna Passey. The character made her first appearance on 21 November 2012 and was introduced as the estranged twin sister of established character Dodger Savage (Danny Mac), along with her father Patrick Blake (Jeremy Sheffield). Emily Lawrance was originally selected for the role, however Passey replaced her within weeks and only she has appeared on-screen as Sienna. The character has had a daughter, Nico (Persephone Swales-Dawson), with Dodger, and twins Sebastian and Sophie with Warren Fox (Jamie Lomas), an affair with Darren Osborne (Ashley Taylor Dawson), a marriage with Ben Bradley (Ben Richards), an affair with Trevor Royle (Greg Wood) who was later killed by Nico, a relationship with her half-sister Liberty Savage's (Jessamy Stoddart) former boyfriend Brody Hudson (Adam Woodward), and been diagnosed with cervical cancer while pregnant. Passey took a short break from the show in early 2020 and was absent between 17 January and 30 March.

In February 2024, Sienna discovers that her love rival Dilly Harcourt (Emma Johnsey-Smith) is Patrick's daughter and her half-sister. However, in the episode aired on 21 August 2024, it was revealed that Patrick was not Sienna's father; it was, in fact, his twin brother Jeremy Blake (also played by Sheffield). Sienna enters into a relationship with Ethan Williams (Matthew James-Bailey), but accidentally pushes him to his death on their wedding day, when his affair with Vicky Grant (Anya Lawrence) is revealed. Jeremy helps her conceal Ethan's murder, and he frames Dilly; Sienna discovers later that Jeremy had killed her and is a serial killer and killing Clare Devine ( Gemma Bissix),also gaslighted Cleo McQueen (Nadine Rose Mulkerrin). On 22 October 2025 Sienna is one of many Hollyoaks characters that appears in the crossover with Brookside.

== Casting ==
The character of Sienna was announced on 7 October 2012, with Emily Lawrance cast in the role, however the role was recast with Passey before the character made her on-screen debut. Sienna is the twin sister of Dodger Savage (Danny Mac), the twin sibling Dodger never knew he had. Passey made her first on-screen appearance as Sienna in the episode broadcast on 21 November 2012.

== Development ==
Sienna Blake is beautiful, clever and calculating, often keeping secrets from those around her. A troubled girl with serious insecurities, Sienna conceals her cold, cynical and manipulative behaviour beneath a charming, warm exterior. This conflicting personality has allowed Sienna to lure many into her web of lies and deceit...

— Channel4.com on Sienna.

In an interview with Digital Spy Passey described Sienna as a "bit of a villain" with a more "complicated" narrative. When she joined the show, Passey was disclosed the background of Sienna's character by the producers, "I knew all about her upbringing and the problems she'd had with her family." On the characters background Passey said, "She's had quite an unusual upbringing, because she's never really had any friends. Usually, most people learn how to socialise and form relationships with people as they grow up, but Sienna has missed out on all of that. She's only ever really had her father."

Passey opined that Sienna is not "evil". Speaking to Inside Soap, Passey said: "With her upbringing, she isn't an out-and-out evil person. She really believes she's got her reasons to do what she does."

=== Long lost daughter ===
On 20 May 2014, it was announced that actress Persephone Swales-Dawson would play Nico Blake, who is revealed to be Sienna's long lost daughter. Although she knows that Sienna is her mother, Sienna believes otherwise due to her being told by her father, Patrick, that her daughter is someone else. Although Sienna, initially disbelieves Nico, she starts investigating her claim after suspecting that she has something to do with Nancy Osborne (Jessica Fox) finding out about her new job, which leads to Sienna finally recognizing that Nico is her daughter.

Upon their reunion, Passey noted that their reunion wasn't what Sienna was expecting, and that when she finds out that Patrick threatened Nico to stay away, Sienna would be heartbroken. Passey also commented how both characters would have an interesting time ahead of them as neither of them is what the other one was expecting, with Passey noting how Sienna isn't "necessarily mum material!" Hollyoaks producer Bryan Kirkwood also refused to answer whether Sienna and Nico would be able to keep their happily ever after.

On 4 September 2014, it was announced that Dodger, Sienna's twin brother, was Nico's father. It was discover that Dodger and Sienna had met briefly years ago, and slept together, without knowing they were twins. A spokesperson told Digital Spy today: "Sienna and Dodger were estranged as children and each did not discover they had a twin until adulthood. When Nico was conceived 14 years ago, it was a chance meeting and they did not know that they were related." In an interview with Danny Mac, conducted at the Inside Soap Awards 2014, Daniel Kilkelly noted how some fans loved the twist with Dodger being Nico's father, whereas others hated it. Danny Mac commented that when Dodger finds out he will feel "physically sick", as he never could have "thought this could have been possible." He also said that Dodger would strive to do the right thing, even if he didn't know what that was. In an interview with Digital Spy, Bryan Kirkwood stated that Dodger being the father of Nico had been discussed "right from the start", and that they pushed Dodger being the father due to the audience thinking that it was going to be Patrick, Sienna's father.

=== Sexual harassment ===
On 28 December 2018 it was announced that Sienna will be sexually harassed by a newcomer Laurie Shelby (Kyle Pryor), when he holds onto her waist for an uncomfortable amount of time. Sienna feels "unsettled" afterwards and confronts Laurie. A storyline was announced on November follow by the arrival of Pryor in the series, producer Kirkwood wanted Pryor character to feature in a sexual assault storyline exploring the MeToo movement. On-screen, the character meets with a woman who he sexually assaulted and has paid to sign a non-disclosure agreement, ensuring that the truth is not revealed.

== Storylines ==
=== Backstory ===
Sienna was raised by her controlling and physically abusive father Patrick Blake (Jeremy Sheffield), after her mentally unstable mother Anna Blake (Saskia Wickham) left with twin brother Mark, known as Dodger Savage (Danny Mac) after trying to kill Sienna and Dodger in a murder/suicide attempt. Believing her brother to be dead, she was raised as an only child in a wealthy home. Sienna attended private school but at the age of 13, she had a brief encounter with a teenage boy at a school where her father was working at over the summer. Sienna became pregnant at this time, not knowing that her brief encounter with the teenage boy was in fact her estranged twin brother Dodger, and was locked in a basement whilst she had the baby. She named the baby Sophie, who later turns to be Nico Blake (Persephone Swales-Dawson), however Patrick lied that Nico was stillborn.

Sienna was not allowed to grieve for the baby she lost and went on to live a normal life. She was head girl at her school and went to university. She continued to live with her father until she was tracked down by Dodger and decided to move to Hollyoaks to be closer to him.

=== 2012–present ===
Dodger tracks his father Patrick down but is adamant that his son died. After Dodger proves his real identity, Patrick reveals Sienna is his twin sister. Sienna begins spending time with Dodger and takes a dislike to half brother Will Savage (James Atherton). She later discovers Will and Dodger's girlfriend Texas Longford (Bianca Hendrickse-Spendlove) slept together, angry at him for hurting Dodger and would do anything to bring Texas back to her brother, which angers Will. Sienna secures a job at the local pub and befriends Darren (Ashley Taylor Dawson) and Nancy Osborne (Jessica Fox). Sienna soon starts to interfere in their relationship. When she realises that Nancy is developing an addiction to painkillers, Sienna manipulates the situation to get closer to Darren. When Nancy tries to overcome her addiction Sienna begins spiking her drinks and food with painkillers. Sienna finds Nancy sleeping and starts a fire with an iron to make Nancy appear unable to look after her and Darren's baby son, Oscar. She then pushes Oscar's empty pram into traffic causing Nancy to get hit by a car. The series events causes the breakdown of Nancy and Darren's marriage.

Sienna sleeps with Darren but ensures that Nancy catches them. No one believes Nancy's accusations that Sienna is trying to steal her life and family. Sienna then convinces Nancy to run away with Oscar and Charlie Dean (Charlie Behan). But when Nancy leaves, Sienna harms herself and fills her flat with gas to make it appear that Nancy has tried to kill her. The police believe that Nancy has abducted her own children and a police chase results in Nancy's car hanging off the edge of a multi-storey car park. Sienna is delighted when her plan sees Nancy sectioned. When Sienna realises that Darren still loves Nancy she pretends to be pregnant. She fakes scans and appointments while trying to get pregnant. But she becomes more unstable as the lie escalates. Problems in the Osborne household arise from Esther Bloom (Jazmine Franks) and Tom Cunningham (Ellis Hollins) who still support Nancy. She attempts to manipulate the situation but Tom begins to suspect that Sienna is lying about her pregnancy and catches her breast-feeding Oscar. Tom decides to plant a hidden camera and discovers that Sienna has been wearing a prosthetic baby bump.

When an explosion occurs in the local council flats, Sienna kidnaps Tom. She tells him that he caused the explosion and Darren has died. She locks him in the cellar of her childhood home and holds him captive, bringing him food daily. Sienna then discovers her half-brother Will had kidnapped her family including his own, and discovers that he murdered their mother and will never forgive him for what he has done and even to Dodger's love life Texas. She discovers in her mother's will that she and Dodger were now co-owners alongside their father, as Patrick is legally married at that time. Tom is declared missing and a police investigation is launched. Sienna convinces Chloe (Susan Loughnane) to sell her unborn baby to her. Tom manages to escape and Nancy is released from the secure unit. Nancy confronts Sienna and rips her dress revealing that she is not pregnant. An upset Sienna then tries to convince her brother, Dodger, to run away. But she attempts to kiss him. Sienna then abducts Tom, Charlie and Oscar and locks them in the Roscoe's garage. She then tries to kill them with exhaust fumes; they are saved and Sienna is sectioned. It is then revealed that Sienna had a child when she was a teenager. Patrick told her the baby died but he had actually put it up for adoption. Dodger vows to help Sienna find her daughter.

Gangster Fraser Black (Jesse Birdsall) sways a corrupt judge to let Sienna walk free. But other residents are unforgiving and start a hate campaign against her, but later forgive her for what happened in her past, and blame her father for ruining her life. When she learns that Peri Lomax (Ruby O'Donnell) was born on the same day as her daughter and is adopted, she assumes Peri is her daughter. Sienna manipulates Leela Lomax (Kirsty-Leigh Porter) into letting her move in. Sienna then exposes Danny Lomax's (Stephen Billington) affair with John Paul McQueen (James Sutton) to ruin his marriage to Sam Lomax (Lizzie Roper). The friction causes Peri to rely on Sienna more. Sienna ensures Sam discovers that Danny has slept with George Smith (Steven Roberts). She then tries to abduct Peri but the police believe it is a misunderstanding. When Leela confronts Sienna, she claims that Peri is her daughter. Leela then reveals that Peri is her own daughter and not her sister. Leela forgives Sienna and tries to help her find Sophie. Patrick pays the adoptive parent to tell Sienna that Sophie, now named Caroline, has run away.

Sienna finds her daughter Nico and she comes to live with her. Patrick plots to send Nico away, but Sienna eventually stands up to Patrick. He later reveals that Nico's father is Dodger. He explains that the pair met while in their teenage years, and slept together, but have failed to recognize each other as adults. Patrick realised that Dodger was her brother and adopting Nico and locked Sienna away for her own good. Sienna becomes obsessed with Dodger and takes him and Nico hostage to create the perfect family. Sienna later pretends to help her half-brother Will, but she never forgave him for killing their mother. She and Will later told Theresa McQueen (Jorgie Porter) to kill Dodger, since they knew that she murdered Calvin Valentine (Ricky Whittle) five years ago, but she refuses. With Will in a coma, and later killed by Gloved Hand Killer, Dodger leaves the village forever and Sienna admitted to a mental illness facility. She is later discharged by Dr. Charles S'avage (Andrew Greenough) and the pair form a friendship. When she is released she tries to make amends with Nico but her behaviour becomes increasingly odd. Following a series of rows, Sienna is stung by a bee and goes into anaphylactic shock. Nico purposely withholds her medication and she is rushed to hospital. Sienna later meets Ben Bradley (Ben Richards) and they begin a relationship. She starts to suspect that Ben is being unfaithful following his visits with a mystery woman named Carly (Sophie Wise). Sienna tracks her down and confronts her then a fight ensues. Nico strikes Carly over the head with a paperweight, killing her. Sienna asks Dr. S'avage to help dispose of her body at the hospital, but Ben finds her body and reveals that Carly is his daughter. Sienna feels guilty that her daughter has killed his daughter, but agrees to protect Nico. She lets Trevor Royle (Greg Wood) take the blame but he is later released. Problems with Nico continue and she slaps Sienna. Sienna also deals with Patrick's deteriorating health due to motor-neuron disease and his subsequent suspicious death.

Sienna later becomes increasingly annoyed with Ben's feud with Trevor and Ben agrees to stop. But he attacks Trevor, leaving him in hospital. Sienna discovers that Ben was responsible and she starts to help Trevor who is suffering from post-traumatic stress disorder. She sees a different side to Trevor and develops feelings for him and they begin an affair. Nico stops taking her kidney transplant anti-rejection medication and needs another transplant. She tries to kill Theresa and Sienna helps to save her life. She agrees to keep the incident a secret but Nico overhears Sienna telling Trevor. Feeling betrayed, Nico stabs Sienna with a glass bottle. Sienna tells police that she cannot remember who attacked her. She and Trevor then plan to make Nico confess to some of her crimes as Sienna fears for her safety. Subsequently, Nico murders Trevor on his wedding day to Grace Black (Tamara Wall); fearing that Sienna would run away with him. Upon learning that Nico killed Trevor, Ben falsely confesses and is convicted.

Sienna begins a relationship with Warren Fox (Jamie Lomas) and they plan to have Maxine arrested for Patrick's murder; but upon discovering Nico was responsible, Sienna tries to protect her by falsely confessing. After Warren and Maxine discover Nico's crimes, they force Sienna to tell the truth, and she is released from prison. Police chase Nico and she is caught in the blaze at the Halloween Spooktacular; Sienna pleads with Warren to save Nico, but he instead chooses to save Sienna's life and let Nico die. Sienna blames Warren for Nico's death and vows revenge. Upon learning that Warren's son Joel Dexter (Rory Douglas-Speed) is working in Hollyoaks as a Catholic priest, Sienna begins attending his church and tries to get close to him; truthfully giving details of her situation with Warren and Nico, but using false names. However, she struggles to keep her visits to Joel a secret from Warren. After Joel rejects Sienna when she tries to kiss him, she conspires to make Warren believe that a man from the church is stalking her. Sienna plans to get revenge on Warren for Nico's death by killing Joel however it goes wrong after Joel realizes Sienna's plans and she accidentally knocks a lamp into some petrol in the garage which causes a fire in which Joel is trapped inside. Warren attempts to help Joel however the garage explodes sending the three of them to the ground.

Sienna discovers she is pregnant by Warren. At a hospital appointment, they learn they are expecting twins. Warren murders Bart McQueen (Jonny Clarke) after suspecting him to be involved in his sister Katy's (Hannah Tointon) death. Sienna helps him hide the corpse in the attic of an empty flat, which Sally St. Claire (Annie Wallace) soon moves into. Warren later begins an affair with Grace after revealing that he has put plans in place to take the twins away from Sienna as soon as they are born. However, Sienna collapses and experiences spotting, and she is taken to hospital, where they run some tests. The results show that Sienna has cervical cancer, and will need a hysterectomy to remove the tumour, however this will put the twins at a high risk. Sienna is against the idea at first but after a heart-to-heart with Myra McQueen (Nicole Barber-Lane), she decides to have the hysterectomy.

On Sienna and Warren's wedding day, Warren is stabbed by Grace because unknown to Sienna, they were having an affair and Warren chose Sienna over Grace. Warren collapses in Sienna's arms but he survives. At the hospital, Warren threatens Grace and says he will tell the police everything but Grace says she will tell Sienna the truth. While Sienna is talking to Warren, he mistakes her for Grace since he is on medication and accidentally reveals the affair to Sienna. An angry Sienna confronts Grace and together they plan for Sienna to escape with the twins. With the help of Kim Butterfield (Daisy Wood-Davis), Sienna escapes from the hospital before Warren can catch them. Off-screen, Warren discovers where Sienna is and kidnaps her, taking her to an abandoned house in the middle of nowhere. He tells Sienna that when the babies are born he will take them away from her. When Warren comes to visit Sienna, she takes his keys and locks him in. Before he finds her, she carves a message on his car, which is noticed by Kim. Sienna fakes going into labour and when Warren is about to take her to the hospital he discovers the message and realises Sienna is faking it so takes her back into the house. When Sienna goes into labour for real, Warren refuses to believe her. Kim comes to rescue her but Warren catches them. Kim convinces him to let her go and he agrees. After the babies are born, Sienna tells him that he will not be involved in the twins' lives, so Warren takes their daughter Sophie, leaving Sienna devastated.

Sienna becomes depressed and struggles with her baby Sebastian. Sienna and Joel become close, making his ex-girlfriend Cleo McQueen (Nadine Rose Mulkerrin) jealous. Sienna becomes jealous when Joel and Cleo begin a relationship, but is relieved when her cancer is cured. Sienna threatens Cleo and tells her she will kill her if she gets in the way of her and Joel, but Cleo stands up to her telling her that she has nothing to lose. Sienna lies to Joel saying that Warren is back to get his attention but Cleo finds out she's lying and Sienna tells Joel the truth. Sienna is left shaken when she finds someone in her flat. She is shocked when she receives a text message who she thinks is Warren. Maxine discovers this and tells Joel but he doesn't believe her, however, Cleo convinces him to go find Sienna. Sienna later meets up with the stranger in the carpark and when Joel arrives the stranger drives off but Sienna tries to stop him and she gets run over. At the hospital, Sienna tells Joel she will never forgive him for ruining her chances of getting Sophie back. The doctor tells her that they have found a shadow leaving Sienna worried. A few weeks later the doctor tells her that her cancer hasn't returned. Joel who recently reconciled with Cleo prepares to tell Sienna the truth but she senses it's bad news so she tells him her cancer has returned. Sienna meets up with Myra in the village and tells her that she thinks Joel is seeing someone else. Myra discovers that it's Cleo and warns Joel to stick by Sienna. Sienna later tells Joel that the cancer is terminal.

Misbah Maalik (Harvey Virdi) finds out that Sienna is lying about her cancer and confronts her. Sienna later finds a teddy bear and is shocked when it says it knows she's lying about her cancer. She confronts Misbah since she is the only one who knows the truth but she denies everything. Sienna is left unsettled when she finds a countdown on her laptop. Joel arrives at her flat and tells her that he and Cleo are back together and an angry Sienna confesses that there is no cancer. Joel calls her insane and she slaps him. He tells her to never speak to him again leaving Sienna alone. Sienna returns home to find her flat decorated with Christmas decorations. She finds an envelope with a locket in it and in the locket there's a picture of Sienna and Ben. She meets up with Ben in the Hutch but his son Josh Bradley (Rupert Hill) shows up instead and confronts Sienna for ruining his father's life. He follows Sienna home and he smells gas, quickly turning off the cooker. Sienna is left scared and tells Josh that someone is out to get her.

Sienna becomes increasingly paranoid about the stalker and believes that it is Cleo or Darren. The stalker is revealed to be Nico, who survived the fire. When Sienna tries to get help, Nico stabs Sienna and escaped. An injured Sienna goes outside into the village and hands Sebastian to Joel before collapsing. While on her deathbed, she apologises to Myra and Joel who forgive her. Grace and Maxine arrive and they say their goodbyes and Sienna goes into cardiac arrest. Josh comes out and reveals that Sienna has died. Joel and Myra go into her room to say goodbye and Joel tells her he loves her. After her death several residents including Grace, Maxine, Tom and Simone Loveday (Jacqueline Boatswain) mourn her. The police decide to use Sienna's funeral to catch Nico, however, Myra and Joel refuse at first but decide that it is the only way Nico will be caught. On the day of the funeral, Nico takes Sebastian who was taken to the hospital by Sally after falling ill. Nico makes her way towards the hospital roof because the police had swarmed the hospital. She was being followed by someone dressed in black who is revealed to be Sienna, still alive, leaving Nico shocked. Sienna was working with several police officers, including Josh to catch Nico.

Sienna confronts Nico on the rooftop demanding that she hands over Sebastian. Sienna persuades Nico to hand herself in, until Nico pulls down her jumper revealing she's heavily pregnant. Nico begs Sienna to help her change and become a better person but before Sienna can say anything Warren shows up. He tells Sienna that Sophie has her eyes and that they can now be a proper family and he forces her to choose between him and the twins or Nico. An emotional Sienna tells Nico that she needs to face justice but Nico is furious and pushes Sienna towards the edge of the roof and as she does, Warren snatches Sebastian before running away and locking the door. Josh heads to the roof but Sienna and Nico are nowhere to be found. Sienna runs into her own wake begging for help leaving the villagers speechless. Joel takes Sienna into the bathroom wanting an explanation and Sienna tells him that Warren is back but he refuses to believe her. Sienna runs out to save Sebastian and catches up to Warren, but he drives off leaving Sienna crying hysterically in the village. It is later revealed that Sienna is hiding a pregnant Nico away in her flat since Nico is the only family she has left.

Sienna blackmails Darren into giving her £2,000 since she knows about his affair with Mandy Richardson (Sarah Jayne Dunn). Sienna runs into Leela in Price Slice and Leela asks if they can catch up but even though Sienna makes up excuses, Leela lets herself into her flat almost catching Nico in the process. Nico is furious to discover that Peri has a new friend, Harley Frater (Mollie Lambert). While at Harley's birthday party, Nico tries to hurt Harley by pushing her down the steps but Sienna stops her. Believing Nico to be a danger to herself, Sienna locks Nico in her room. Nico starts to become bored inside her room so Sienna suggests that she goes knitting. While they are knitting, Nico hides a needle up her sleeve. Nico unlocks the door with the needle and tries to escape but Joel arrives asking Sienna why she is moving, so Nico hides. Nico knocks something and Sienna kisses Joel to distract him, shocking him. Sienna takes Nico for her scan but panics when she disappears. Nico arrives home in labour and Sienna helps deliver her baby, whom she names Victoria. Sienna is alarmed when she overhears Nico telling her baby that she is going to kill Peri and confronts her over this. Realising how evil Nico is, Sienna calls Joel to come to the flat. When he arrives, Sienna gives him Victoria and tells him to take Victoria to the hospital. Nico comes out of her room and notices that Victoria is missing and she attacks Sienna after realising that she gave her away. Leela arrives and pulls Nico of Sienna and accidentally pushes Nico against a table. Believing Nico to be dead, Leela apologises to Sienna but Nico wakes up and screams "I hate you" at Sienna. Nico pushes Leela and tries to kill Sienna with a glass vase but Sienna hits her with a doorstop, killing her. A distraught Sienna decides to call the police but Leela convinces her to go to Spain. Sienna visits Victoria in hospital to say goodbye and Joel comes in. She tells Joel that Victoria is Nico's baby and they have a heart-to-heart. Sienna meets up with Josh in the village and confesses to killing Nico and Josh arrests her, but before he takes her away, Sienna says goodbye to Joel.

In September 2018, Sienna returns after she is released from prison. She is greeted by Nancy who wants Sienna to help her ruin Darren's life, the way she ruined hers. She tells Nancy that the new Sienna doesn't do revenge. Sienna and Kyle Kelly (Adam Rickett) take Nancy out to make Darren jealous. Liberty tries to reconnect with Sienna but she isn't interested. After Liberty breaks up with Brody Hudson (Adam Woodward), she moves in with Sienna. Sienna berates Brody over cheating on Liberty, unaware of the recent revelation of his sexual abuse from Buster Smith (Nathan Sussex). Sienna tries to apologise and she confides in him about Patrick and they almost kiss but Liberty catches them. Liberty moves out but Sienna apologises and they reconcile. Sienna is determined become a teacher at Hollyoaks High but is turned down by Sally. When she hears Nancy call in sick, she decides to take her class. Sally is furious and is about to take action but Imran Maalik (Ijaz Rana) tells her that the lesson was enjoyable so she relents and decides to give Sienna a chance. While teaching a class, Sienna wrongly accuses autistic teenager Brooke Hathaway (Talia Grant) of stealing a model heart and shouts at her before grabbing her by the arm causing her to have a meltdown. Sienna begins to doubt her career over this, however, Laurie Shelby (Kyle Pryor) convinces her it was just a mistake. Liberty gives Sienna her blessing to be with Brody. Sienna supports Brody through Buster's trial and is relieved when he is found guilty.

Sienna is left feeling uncomfortable when he holds onto her waist for too long. She confronts him over this but he claims that she misread the situation and gives her a week of work as compensation. Laurie continues to play mind games with Sienna and when Sienna wobbles while standing on a ladder he puts his hand on Sienna to steady her. Later, Laurie asks her out for a drink but she says they should not go on a date and Laurie makes her feel like she jumped to conclusions. After having a fight with Laurie's wife Sinead Shelby (Stephanie Davis), Sienna invites him over to have pizza with herself and Brody but Sinead invites herself along. Laurie suggests they play truth or dare and it takes a dark turn when he dares Sienna to streak around the village. Laurie intimidates Sienna and kisses her but tells her that she came onto him and Laurie later confides in Sally that Sienna kissed him. Sinead is convinced that they are having an affair and humiliates Sienna at the charity ball by pouring punch over her. Laurie tells Brody that Sienna kissed him and he confronts her but Sienna tells him what Laurie has been doing to her and Brody promises to stick by her. Laurie suggest that Sienna comes on the camping trip with the school kids, much to Sinead's anger. Before they leave, Laurie rips up his tent to make it unusable. Laurie offers to sleep outside but later chucks water over himself blaming it on Charlie. Sienna allows him to sleep in the tent with her. During the night, Laurie puts his arm over her but claims he was asleep and mistook her for Sinead. Sienna is left shaken the next morning and Laurie tells Brody that he and Sienna shared a tent together. Sienna emotionally confides in Brody about how terrified she was. Sienna tries to record Laurie confessing but he realises what she is trying to do and threatens her. Sienna tells Brody and Liberty that she will tell Sally about Laurie . At the Easter fete, Laurie tries to persuade Sienna not to tell Sally but then blackmails her saying that she was harassing him. Laurie organises a game where two people dive into a ball pit to win a free meal. Coincidentally, Laurie and Sienna are picked and when no one is looking, Laurie grabs Sienna's bum. This pushes her over the edge, causing her to slap Laurie, shocking the crowd. Sienna tells Sally everything, however, Laurie convinces Sally that Sienna is in the wrong. Brody becomes fed up with Laurie and bundles him into a car and drives off. He tries to force Laurie to confess but he brings up Buster causing Brody to break down. The school board decide to drop the allegations against Laurie and he is allowed return to work. When Sienna notices that Laurie switched the books with The Thaming of The Shrew she has a meltdown which is witnessed by Sally who warns her that she could lose her job. Sienna goes to the hospital to speak to Sinead and Sinead lets it slip that Laurie goes to anger management. Sienna returns to the school and knocks Laurie unconscious and ties him up in order to get him to confess. Laurie unties himself and tries to attack Sienna but she locks him in the room and threatens him with a fire extinguisher. Brody and Liberty arrive and Brody tries to convince Sienna not to hurt Laurie or she will go to prison. Sinead reports Laurie to the police for raping her and Sienna and Sinead have an emotional heart to heart and agree to be there for each other. Sally arrives and tells them that she is on their side and that Laurie will not get away with it. However, Sinead is arrested for giving the police the wrong information about the night Laurie raped her and he is allowed return to work. Nancy invites him to go for a drink and afterwards she meets up with Sienna where it is revealed that they are working together to bring Laurie down.

When Sienna discover her twins, she approaches Nina and asks her for help. As she refuses, Sienna takes her captive, despite Nina calls for help as Sienna leaves with the twins. However, she later discover that Maxine had fake her illness the entire time. In order to escape with the twins, Sienna promises to keep Maxine's secret if Maxine keeps quiet about Sienna taking the twins. Maxine agrees, while Sienna had convinced her to tell the truth to Damon, but she refuses and for worst Damon is arrested for fraud. Meanwhile, Sienna and Brody have decided to have a baby together. When Liberty points out that Sienna can't have anymore kids because she's had cancer, but Sienna tells her that she had some of her eggs frozen prior to the cancer and decides to start looking for a surrogate. Liberty offers to be their surrogate. Brody tells Liberty that he's not keen with Liberty being their surrogate. Liberty angrily tells Brody that she will help Sienna whether he likes it or not, which makes him change his mind. However he later discover that Sienna knew Maxine faked an illness upon learning that Damon's half-brother Scott exposed Maxine's secret and realises that Maxine learned about Sienna going to kidnap the twins, they end their relationship. Despite Sienna blames on Maxine for ruined her relationship with Brody, she then blames on her father for ruined Maxine's life. With Damon words, Brody and Sienna forgive each other. Sienna decide to forgive Maxine for Minnie's sake. Unfortunately, Sienna and Brody discover from Liberty that there was no heartbeat and that she's lost the baby, which devastates Sienna and Brody. Sienna meets Sid Sumner (Billy Price) who killed his father in self-defence due to his actions as a far-right extremist. Learning Sid's past, she decides to help him and calls social services. Sienna comforts Sid when he says he has no family. Sienna allows Sid to stay at her house until social services find him a permanent home. When Sienna discovers that Liberty and Brody had sex, she is upset and wants revenge, but she later discovers that they did this so that they could give her a child.

== Reception ==
At The National Television Awards 2014, Passey garnered a nomination for "Most Popular Newcomer". She was nominated in the "Best Bitch" category during The Inside Soap Awards 2013. In addition "Sienna plots to steal Nancy's life" received a nomination for "Best Storyline". The latter was also nominated for an identical accolade at The British Soap Awards 2014, but it was the "Villain of the Year" award that Passey secured at the ceremony. In August 2017, Passey was longlisted for "Best Actress" at The Inside Soap Awards 2017. The nomination made the viewer-voted shortlist, although she lost out to Lucy Fallon, who portrays Bethany Platt in Coronation Street. Passey was later nominated for the "Best Actress" award at The British Soap Awards 2018, however lost out again to Fallon. In 2018, Passey was nominated for best actress at the Inside Soap Awards.

In 2025, Sienna and Cleo received a "Best Soap Couple" nomination at the Digital Spy Reader Awards. Passey was longlisted for "Best Villain" and "Best Actress" at the 2026 Inside Soap Awards, whilst "Clare & Sienna's final showdown" was longlisted for "Best Showstopper".

Tina Campbell of the Metro praised Passey's portrayal and described Sienna as having various layers to her personality. She noted that a backstory consisting of a woman beating father, unhinged mother and long-lost brother left her normality doomed. She added that "despite her (many) flaws, you can't help but love Sienna" and deemed her Hollyoaks' best character. Katie Archer of BT described Sienna as appearing "sweet and innocent", but "on the inside, things are far uglier." MSN.com labeled the character a "barmaid [turned] psychopath". Viewers' perception of Sienna changed during her tenure. A startled Passey told an Inside Soap reporter that Sienna gained sympathy following revelations about her long-lost daughter.

== See also ==
- List of LGBT characters in soap operas
- List of soap opera villains
