= Andrew Still =

Andrew Still may refer to:

- Andrew Taylor Still (1828–1917), founder of osteopathic medicine
- Andrew Still (actor) (born 1993), Scottish actor
