= Cleo McQueen =

Fictional character from Hollyoaks

- Hollyoaks character
- Portrayed by: Nadine Mulkerrin
- Duration: 2015–2022, 2024–present
- First appearance: 26 January 2015
- Introduced by: Bryan Kirkwood (2015); Hannah Cheers and Angelo Abela (2024)
- Crossover appearances: Brookside (2025)
In-universe information
- Occupation: Waitress; Barmaid; Nursing student
- Family: McQueen
- Mother: Reenie McQueen
- Stepfather: Pete Buchanan
- Sisters: Celine McQueen
- Half-sisters: Porsche McQueen
- Sons: Joseph McQueen
- Grandmothers: Marlena McQueen
- Aunts: Myra McQueen
- First cousins: Mercedes McQueen; John Paul McQueen; Theresa McQueen; Carmel McQueen; Jacqui McQueen; Michaela McQueen; Tina Reilly; Carmina McQueen
- Other relatives: Phoebe McQueen (adoptive); Bart McQueen; Goldie McQueen; Hunter McQueen; Prince McQueen; Breda McQueen

Cleo McQueen is a fictional character from the British Channel 4 soap opera Hollyoaks, played by Nadine Mulkerrin. Cleo is a member of the show's established McQueen family and was introduced as the younger sister of Porsche (Twinnie-Lee Moore) and Celine McQueen (Sarah George), who arrived in late 2014. Actress Jennifer Metcalfe, who plays Mercedes McQueen, suggested that more McQueens should be introduced, as she knew the show was losing two members of the family. Mulkerrin had previously auditioned for the role of Phoebe Jackson, however this role was later given to Mandip Gill. Upon learning she had been cast as Cleo, she gave up her job as a waitress and relocated to Liverpool, where the show is filmed. She made her first appearance during the episode broadcast on 26 January 2015. Mulkerrin took maternity leave from the show in 2019, departing in the episode broadcast on 4 November 2019. She returned on 18 November 2020 before departing permanently on 24 May 2022 after Mulkerrin decided to leave the soap. The character made an unannounced return on 16 January 2024.

Cleo is portrayed as being studious, sensible and witty. She leaves her boarding school to be with her family in Hollyoaks village. Shortly after, she is given her first love interest in Harry Thompson (Parry Glasspool), who struggles with his sexuality while dating her. Cleo is central to a long-running sexual abuse storyline, in which she is manipulated and abused by her stepfather Pete Buchanan (Kai Owen). The cast and crew worked with child protection charity NSPCC on the storyline, while Mulkerrin met with abuse survivors during her research. During the storyline Cleo is also involved in a car crash stunt, and takes the blame for killing Rachel Hardy (Jennifer Brooke) to protect her friend Holly Cunningham (Amanda Clapham). She later develops feelings for Rachel's fiancé Nathan Nightingale (Jared Garfield).

Cleo's second issue-led storyline saw her taking heroin, following Nathan and Celine's deaths. Producers later paired the character with trainee priest Joel Dexter (Rory Douglas-Speed). The relationship has faced several obstacles, including a motorbike crash, Joel's recommitment to the Church, a kidnapping, and pregnancy. Cleo's third issue-led storyline saw her develop bulimia nervosa in December 2017. For her portrayal of Cleo, Mulkerrin won the Best Newcomer accolade at the 2015 Digital Spy Reader Awards. In 2017, she earned a nomination for Best Female Dramatic Performance at The British Soap Awards. She has also been longlisted for Best Actress at the Inside Soap Awards twice. Television critics praised Mulkerrin's performance during the abuse storyline. Others have enjoyed Cleo's relationship with Joel, and one stated she was the best member of the McQueen family.

== Creation and casting ==
In May 2014, Daniel Kilkelly of entertainment website Digital Spy reported that three new members of the McQueen family were in the process of being cast. The show's executive producer Bryan Kirkwood stated, "Towards the end of this year we're going to meet an extended branch of the McQueen family. There are going to be some colourful new faces to help them reclaim their crown at the heart of the show." Kirkwood later explained that the idea for the new McQueens came from actress Jennifer Metcalfe, who plays Mercedes McQueen. She knew the show was losing Mercedes' sister, Carmel McQueen (Gemma Merna), and she herself was taking a break. Kirkwood and Metcalfe are both "passionate" about the McQueens and looked at other famous soap families, like the Mitchells from EastEnders, and realised there could be many other McQueens out there.

Two months later, it was announced that actresses Twinnie-Lee Moore and Sarah George had been cast as Porsche and Celine McQueen, nieces of established character Myra McQueen (Nicole Barber-Lane). Kilkelly's colleague, Sophie Dainty reported that Porsche and Celine would eventually be joined by their younger sister, but casting details had not been confirmed at the time. On 1 January 2015, Kilkelly announced that actress Nadine Rose Mulkerrin had been cast in the role of Porsche and Celine's sister, Cleo McQueen. Mulkerrin gave up her job as a waitress for the part and relocated to Liverpool, where the show is filmed. Mulkerrin originally auditioned for the role of Phoebe Jackson three years prior to securing the part of Cleo, but the role went to Mandip Gill. She later stated that securing the role of Cleo felt like "fate", as she had been auditioning for the show for a while and wanted to be involved in Cleo's upcoming sexual abuse storyline.

== Development ==
=== Characterisation and introduction ===
Just like her namesake, Cleopatra 'Cleo' McQueen is leader of the outcasts and celebrates the qualities that make her different from all the other kids at school. She's a child genius and has an IQ higher than the rest of the McQueen girls combined!

— An excerpt from Cleo's profile on the official Hollyoaks website.

Describing her character, Mulkerrin stated: "Cleo is a typical McQueen – she's not usually a rebel. But she's got McQueen blood running through her, so there's a lot more to come from Cleo. Just watch this space!" Mulkerrin also said that Cleo was very studious, into her books and also very witty. When asked if she shares any similarities to her character, Mulkerrin admitted that Cleo was smarter than she was, as Mulkerrin is the ditzy member of her friendship group. But she said that they were both sensible and would stay home to revise, while they were in school. The actress also thought Cleo was very different to her sisters, and said that while Cleo loves them, they would often bicker. A writer for the official Hollyoaks website commented that Cleo slowly gets used to living in a house full of "alpha females" and branded her "a drama-free McQueen". Mulkerrin added that Cleo would have a "turbulent time" following her return home to see her family, and would face some old demons. The character's hair is often styled into a bun. In 2017, Mulkerrin branded her character "the dreary McQueen" and "a little nanna".

An Inside Soap columnist reported that Cleo's introduction would give viewers an insight into Porsche and Celine's backstory and their lives before they moved to the village. Cleo's first scenes saw her arrive in Chester in the back of a van. After leaving her boarding school, Cleo hitches a lift and manages to convince a passing beautician to drive her to Chester, after saying that her sisters would buy some of the beautician's stock. Mulkerrin commented that Cleo arrives in "typical McQueen style". Porsche and Celine are happy to be reunited with their sister, while Mulkerrin said it was good for Cleo to be with her sisters again, following several tragedies within the family. She also said Cleo had missed Porsche and Celine. Cleo is enrolled at Hollyoaks High and finds herself in trouble with the headmaster Patrick Blake (Jeremy Sheffield) on her first day. Mulkerrin explained that Cleo is "really clever" and was away on a scholarship, so when she spots Dylan Jenkins (James Fletcher) and Nico Blake (Persephone Swales-Dawson) spray painting a school wall, she points out that they have missed out an apostrophe and adds it in. Patrick catches Cleo and she finds herself in "a whole heap of trouble".

=== Relationship with Harry Thompson ===
When Harry Thompson (Parry Glasspool) returns to the village in February 2015, he begins a relationship with Cleo. During his first day at Hollyoaks High, Harry befriends Cleo when he needs help. He later flirts with her and Cleo "quickly warms to him", as she feels flattered by his attentiveness. Shortly after, Harry kisses Cleo's cousin John Paul McQueen (James Sutton) and he struggles with his sexuality. When his friend Zack Loveday (Duayne Boachie) mentions that John Paul has been showing extra attention to him, Harry kisses Cleo in front of their classmates to prove his interest in her. However, an angry Cleo pushes him away and says Harry has made "a mockery" of her, leaving him to make it up to her.

Glasspool thought Harry did genuinely like Cleo, saying "She's the first friend he made when he arrived. I think Harry does have feelings for her, but at the same time, you do get a sense that he's using her just to distract people and keep up an image. Harry does seem to be fond of Cleo and he does really like her, but it'll be interesting to see how it works out for both of them. I suppose it is a bit mean leading her on if he's not really interested!"

With Harry struggling with his sexuality, he realises that he cannot commit to the relationship and breaks up with Cleo, who is "distraught" by the development. Cleo handles Harry's rejection poorly and hopes that they can sort things out and reconcile. The couple later reunite. When Cleo gets a job at the local coffee shop, she and Harry have a playful whipped cream fight. Her stepfather Pete Buchanan (Kai Owen) sees her with Harry and reports her to Jack Osborne (Jimmy McKenna) for unprofessional behaviour. Cleo suddenly breaks up with Harry and he becomes convinced that she is dating another man. Harry spies on Cleo, but dismisses his suspicions when she meets up with Pete.

Cleo's sister Porsche tries to convince her to give her relationship with Harry another chance. She then embarrasses Cleo by attempting to get her and Harry back together, but it does give Cleo a chance to talk with Harry and he agrees to have a coffee with her. Cleo learns that Harry was hurt when she ended their relationship and he thinks that there was more to her reason for the break up. Cleo later spots a "half-naked" Harry in the street and invites him out for a drink. An Inside Soap writer noted that there was an obvious chemistry between them. During their night out, Cleo suddenly remembers that she has organised a date with her stepfather, ending her chances of reuniting with Harry for good.

=== Sexual abuse ===
On 12 June 2015, Kilkelly (Digital Spy) reported that as part of the show's long-running, issue-led storyline focusing on sexual abuse within the McQueen family, Cleo's stepfather Pete Buchanan (Owen) would form "an inappropriate relationship" with her. Mulkerrin learned about the storyline during her audition for Cleo and knew it would be "pretty heavy". The cast and crew worked with child protection charity NSPCC on the storyline and led a campaign titled "No More Secrets", which encourages victims to speak out. Mulkerrin was passionate about the storyline and wanted to do it justice. She thought that if one person watched the show and decided to speak out, then they had done their job well. On-screen, Cleo's sister Porsche tells her family that Pete sexually abused her when she was 15, but they do not believe her. Pete then reunites with their mother Reenie McQueen (Zöe Lucker) and acts as a stepfather to her daughters, which allows him to start manipulating Cleo. Mulkerrin explained that there would multiple layers to Cleo's story and that it would push the boundaries. She continued, "Cleo turns 18 during this story, so then it raises questions of whether she's an adult who's consenting to this. It's not as simple as her being abused or being a victim."

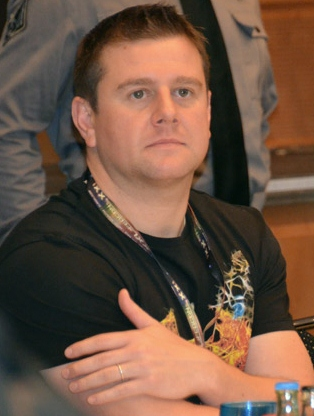
Kai Owen (pictured) plays Cleo's abusive stepfather, Pete Buchanan.

During an interview with Sarah Ellis of Inside Soap, the actress revealed more details on Cleo and Pete's fictional backstory. She explained that Cleo was groomed from the age of thirteen by Pete, which caused her to think that what they have is normal. She thinks that they are in a loving relationship and has no idea that she is being abused. When Ellis pointed out that Cleo appeared reluctant to be alone with Pete, Mulkerrin replied that Cleo is not comfortable with the physical side of their relationship. She continued, "She doesn't get any pleasure from having sex with Pete – they're not equals like they would be in a normal relationship." When Pete wants to be alone with Cleo, she goes along with it because she loves him and does not want him to leave the family. Mulkerrin also told Ellis that Cleo was very jealous of Pete and Reenie's relationship, and she asks Pete to choose who he wants to be with. Cleo wants their relationship to be public knowledge, but Mulkerrin doubted that she could go through with telling her mother the truth.

Pete targets Jade Albright (Kassius Nelson), as he sees that she is also a vulnerable teen that needs "rescuing". Pete befriends Jade after helping her with her school work and asking about her life. Owen commented that Pete wants to get close to Jade, but he also uses her to make Cleo jealous. When Cleo learns about Pete's new friendship, she confronts him and he "brushes it off straight away". Pete assures Cleo that Jade is just a child and he was just helping her with her school work. Owen pointed out, "We've seen time and time again that Pete can manipulate Cleo and easily get her back onside." Cleo becomes increasingly unsettled by the idea of Pete marrying her mother and wants to tell everyone about their affair. She also feels betrayed by Pete's closeness to Jade and his plans to go through with the wedding. She threatens to reveal their relationship and stop the wedding, so Pete tries to talk her round in an alleyway, but they are seen by Cleo's former boyfriend Harry Thompson. Harry confronts Cleo on her own and she reveals that she is in a relationship with Pete. Shortly after Pete and Reenie are married, Harry interrupts the ceremony and tells everyone the truth about Cleo and Pete. Porsche believes Harry straight away.

Pete is later injured in a car accident and Cleo visits him the hospital in secret. She wants "to keep that connection going" and it shows that Pete still has control over her. She also refuses to talk to the police when Reenie and Porsche invite them to the McQueen home. Harry learns that Cleo is visiting Pete and tells her to stop, but when she ignores his plea, he tells her family. Pete later asks Cleo to get rid of a key he has hidden under a floorboard, and viewers learn that it is for a storage unit where Pete has kept all of the correspondence and photographs documenting their relationship. Mulkerrin told Alison Gardner of What's on TV that Cleo realises that she has been abused when she finds photos of Jade among the items. She confronts Jade at the college and Jade describes how Pete called her special bought her gifts, which is what he did with Cleo. Mulkerrin called the moment that Cleo realises the truth "really sad."

Pete gets close to Cleo again and they plan to run away together. After receiving good test results, Cleo reconsiders her plan to run away with Pete and asks if they can wait until she has sat her A levels. An angry Pete is not happy with the change of plan. To take her mind off the situation, Cleo attends the Space Ball, while Pete attempts to reach her on her phone. Cleo eventually decides that she should leave with Pete. While she is attending school for the last time, Holly Cunningham (Amanda Clapham) discovers Cleo's passport and travel tickets. She puts them in her locker and refuses to hand them over to Cleo. Pete orders Cleo to get the documents back and their conversation is overheard by Nathan, who warns Holly. However, they discover Cleo has already broken into Holly's locker and taken back the documents. As Cleo meets up with Pete, Holly, Nathan and John Paul arrive on the scene. John Paul pulls Cleo away and punches Pete in the face, but Pete punches him back. Cleo is conflicted as she feels protective of her cousin, but she is also protective of Pete.

In October 2015, the show's series producer Iain McLeod announced that the storyline would culminate in a trial during 2016. McLeod also confirmed that Pete would not be killed off by the show's Gloved Hand Killer, as they wanted Cleo to reveal the truth about the abuse in "the correct way" in the hope that Pete would be dealt with by the justice system. Mulkerrin confirmed the trial would show viewers that a victim can get justice if they speak up, while Cleo would go through "a range of emotions." The actress also stated that she had met with abuse survivors and learned that it would be "a long process" for Cleo. As the trial begins, Pete still has control over Cleo and he makes her think they have a future together. They stay in contact via a private online chat site, where Pete continues to manipulate Cleo, who still loves him. Cleo's family try to make her see that she is being abused and the way Pete has treated her is not normal, but this causes her to go into denial. Cleo thinks that nobody understands what she and Pete have. Pete belittles Cleo in court and tries to make her seem like a bad witness when he brings up a recent car crash which she took the blame for.

During the episode broadcast on 28 June 2016, Pete was found guilty of child grooming and sexual activity with a child. The trial initially seems to be going in Pete's favour, but after Cleo speaks with Myra, she is convinced to tell the truth about her relationship with Pete. Cleo reveals when she first had sex with Pete, and hands over messages they exchanged and a photograph of them in bed together while she was underage. Following the verdict, Pete was take to prison. The conclusion to the trial marked Owen's final scenes in Hollyoaks. The abuse storyline was revisited in 2017, after Cleo learned Celine was dead. Cleo contacts Pete, as she needs someone to talk to in the wake of her sister's death. Pete uses a contraband phone to send text messages to Cleo and keep in touch with her.

=== Car crash and Nathan Nightingale ===
In March 2016, Cleo is involved in a car crash. She is a passenger in the car driven by Holly, who has been drinking, when it crashes into Nathan Nightingale (Jared Garfield) and his fiancée Rachel Hardy's (Jennifer Brooke) car. Nathan manages to free Cleo from the wreckage, but Rachel is killed during an explosion. Cleo takes the blame for the accident, so Holly is not punished for drink-driving. Clapham told Carena Crawford of All About Soap that Holly feels guilty about Cleo taking the blame. She constantly tells Cleo that she does not have to and insists that she will hand herself in. Holly struggles to forget what happened and turns to Cleo for reassurance. She later grows closer to Nathan and Cleo sees him put his hand on Holly's knee. Cleo then confronts Holly and wonders why she is still covering for her. As the storylines continue, Cleo begins to feel isolated. She feels that Holly has betrayed her, her family have other priorities, and the rest of the village thinks she is a murderer. Cleo's stepfather Pete Buchanan uses this to manipulate her further.

Holly later develops feelings for Nathan and kisses him. As the day of the trial arrives, Nathan is "desperate" for Cleo to face justice for killing Rachel, while Celine and Myra notice that there is tension between Cleo and Holly. Outside the courthouse, Cleo suddenly begins to panic due to the pressure. Cleo is given community service instead of a prison sentence, which causes a "furious" Nathan to tip a bin over her. The truth about the car crash comes out during Pete's trial for abusing Cleo. The defence team ask Cleo if she was really the driver of the car that killed Rachel. Cleo had told Pete the truth about covering for Holly, and he uses his knowledge of the incident against her. A few weeks later, Cleo and Nathan share a "heart-to-heart" and bond over their recent troubles with Pete and Rachel. They eventually agree that they should move on, leading to speculation that there could be a romance between them in the future. The show's social media accounts came up with the portmanteau "Clathan" for the couple.

Cleo and Nathan continue to bond when she is given a job at his family's pub. But when she notices that Holly is struggling and Nathan's behaviour towards her is not helping, Cleo encourages him to forgive Holly or risk losing her friendship. Nathan develops feelings for Cleo. When he receives an anonymous message inviting him to an event at the Loft, he assumes it is from Cleo and is surprised when Lisa Loveday (Rachel Adedeji) makes advances towards him. Nathan's sister encourages him to tell Cleo how he feels at her 18th birthday party, but she rejects him when he attempts to kiss her. She later sets Nathan up with Lisa and they begin dating. However, Cleo later realises that she does have feelings for him. Mulkerrin commented, "It is that blurred line where you really love someone as a friend and start to realise that you are attracted to them on another level." She also thought that Cleo decided to "play Cupid" with Nathan and Lisa, as she did not think she and Nathan were ever going to get together. Celine encourages Cleo to write Nathan an email telling him about her feelings. Mulkerrin described the email as "sweet and honest" and said Cleo has no intention of sending it, but then she discovers Celine has done it for her.

Lisa grows jealous of Nathan and Cleo's close friendship. She also knows Cleo has feelings for Nathan, so she is "furious" when she discovers Nathan has set up a cinema night for Cleo. Lisa tells Cleo to stay away from Nathan and she also asks Nathan to choose between her and Cleo. Mulkerrin thought Cleo and Nathan shared some similarities, saying that they were "on the same wavelength". She also branded them both "cute", "sweet" and "geeky". She also thought they would make a good couple, saying "I'm a sucker for romance, so I'm completely backing 'Clathan', as the fans call them! Cleo knows they have a proper connection – but things are going to get worse for her before they get better..." Shortly after Celine's funeral, Cleo's family encourage her to tell Nathan how she really feels about him. However, just as she gets to the Dog in the Pond, Cleo witnesses Nathan fall to his death. Cleo's friendship with Lisa suffers as a result, and they later fight. Mulkerrin told a writer for the show's official website that Cleo really regrets helping Lisa and Nathan get together.

=== Celine's death and heroin use ===
In late 2016, Cleo's sister Celine is murdered by Cameron Campbell (Cameron Moore). Her body is found weeks later and Cleo struggles in the wake of the discovery, as she tries to accept Celine is dead. Without her mother and older sister Porsche around, it falls to Cleo to arrange Celine's funeral. Mulkerrin described Cleo as feeling "alone and vulnerable" without her mother and sisters, but the other McQueen relatives look out for her. Nana McQueen (Diane Langton) and Cleo's cousin Bart McQueen (Jonny Clarke) also return to the village for the funeral. Mulkerrin commented that Bart is "a bit of a bad egg" and it was not a positive thing for the family to have him around. The actress admitted to feeling nervous while filming the scenes, especially when she had to shoot Cleo's monologue, in which Cleo remembers all the things she and Celine used to get up to when they were younger. Cleo breaks down at the end of her speech, and Mulkerrin said that she just cannot believe that Cameron could have killed Celine. The service ends with Celine's family and friends throwing white feathers in the air. Mulkerrin explained that it was an homage to Celine's saying "If you see a white feather, there's a guardian angel nearby."

"I think Cleo normally has a good moral compass but lately she’s just getting trapped and hanging round with the wrong people. She idolises Bart, and is also still trying to numb the pain of losing Nathan and Celine."

— Mulkerrin on why Cleo turns to drugs.

Cleo's next issue-led storyline saw her taking heroin, along with Bart. The storyline marks the beginning of "a downward spiral" for the character. Mulkerrin felt "lucky" upon receiving such a serious plot, saying "It's a new challenge for me – and for Cleo it's been caused by a build-up of things. She's still grieving for her sister Celine and also for Nathan, who died right in front of her eyes." In the weeks leading up to Cleo taking heroin, she is seen drinking a lot of alcohol to numb her pain, but she believes Bart when he says heroin makes you forget everything. Mulkerrin thought Cleo's actions showed that even the good characters can make bad decisions, and she hoped that her younger fans would see Cleo's downfall and realise how dangerous taking heroin is. Mulkerrin carried out research into how the drug effects people. She also had to consider how Cleo would be feeling during her comedown in scenes set the following day. She confirmed that the storyline would be ongoing and Cleo would be tempted to take heroin again, as it is easily accessible to her through Bart.

Cleo later overdoses and is rushed to hospital by Joel Dexter (Rory Douglas-Speed) and Warren Fox (Jamie Lomas). She is tempted to return to the drugs den with Bart's encouragement. But when she catches him stealing money from Carmina McQueen's (Harlow Jones) christening cards, she feels guilty and confesses to her family that she has taken heroin. Bart flees the house when the McQueens direct their anger towards him for getting Cleo hooked on drugs. Mulkerrin thought Cleo would like to help Bart, but he was potentially beyond help. She also pointed out that he had not been very nice to Cleo, having got her into taking drugs in the first place and then leaving her when she had her overdose. Months later, Cleo relapses when she is rejected romantically by Joel. Darren Osborne (Ashley Taylor Dawson) finds her passed out in a drugs den as he makes a drugs delivery. Seeing Cleo makes it "very real" to Darren and he tries to quit delivering drugs for Shane Sweeney (Michael Salami). Cleo begs Darren not to say anything about her using drugs, while Shane later supplies heroin to her.

=== Relationship with Joel Dexter ===
While she is grieving for her sister, Cleo receives support from Joel, a trainee Catholic priest. She opens up to him and they soon become friend. Mulkerrin commented that Cleo thinks Joel is "one of the good guys". Goldie McQueen (Chelsee Healey) becomes the first to realise that Cleo has a crush on Joel. During a night out at The Loft, Cleo, Goldie and Sienna Blake (Anna Passey) meet Joel and Warren. When Cleo gets drunk and embarrasses herself, Joel offers to walk her home. Cleo misreads the situation and attempts to kiss him. Mulkerrin joked that Cleo wants what she cannot have. After Joel returns from a retreat, Cleo visits him and is concerned by his odd behaviour and mentions of Bart. Joel admits to feeling safe with Cleo and they kiss. However, after Warren suggests that Cleo spend more time with his son, Joel rejects her and "cruelly" tells her to leave him alone. Of Cleo's feelings for Joel, Mulkerrin said "She tells Joel she loves him, but she knows he has restrictions as a man of the cloth. Her feelings may or may not be unrequited".

Cleo and Joel continue to grow closer and she hopes that he will leave the Church for her. When she sees Joel meeting with a heroin dealer, she worries about him and becomes determined to help him. Cleo suggests they clean Joel's motorbike to help him take his mind off of drugs. In the middle of the cleaning, Cleo suddenly reveals that she has feelings for Joel. Mulkerrin called it "a really sweet scene" and thought the viewers would have liked it, as many of them had expressed their wishes for the characters to develop a romantic relationship. Cleo and Joel decide to leave the village and be together. Mulkerrin hinted that their trip would not end well and confirmed that there would be a big stunt, which would have repercussions for everyone involved. Cleo is thrown from the bike when it collides with a car carrying several of the teenage characters. She rolls down a hill and is not found by the paramedics. When Joel comes round, he realises that she is not at the hospital and goes back to find her. Cleo goes into cardiac arrest in the ambulance and Joel begs God to save her in return for him recommitting to the Church.

Cleo attempts to move on from Joel with village newcomer Brody Hudson (Adam Woodward). Brody flirts with Cleo and she agrees to go on a date with him. Joel sees them together and ends up confronting Brody about his intentions towards Cleo. She later tells Joel to back off. Brody and Cleo kiss, but nothing comes of their brief romance. Joel and Cleo are brought together again when Cleo is kidnapped by Shane Sweeney. Shane learns that Joel and Darren Osborne have teamed up and plan to report him to the police, so he uses Cleo as a pawn to get revenge. Mulkerrin told Inside Soap's Laura Heffernan that while Joel and Cleo's relationship is "quite frayed", he still goes to save her. Shane holds Cleo hostage at an abandoned boiler room and when Joel reaches her, Shane locks him in too. Cleo also knows Shane has a gun, so she feels that they are in a "life-and-death" situation. Cleo and Joel reconcile and consummate their relationship. Darren eventually rescues Cleo and Joel, and Shane gives chase. When he manages to grab Cleo, Joel "charged himself" at Shane and caused them to both fall over a cliff edge. While Joel suffers minor injuries, Shane appears to be dead and they leave him. Cleo and Joel later report the incident to the police, but upon returning to the beach, Shane's body is gone.

The incident prompts Joel to leave the Church to be with Cleo. After receiving a postcard from her sister Porsche, Cleo thinks she and Joel should have a holiday. They soon plan a trip to Tanzania so Joel can carry out some volunteer work. Holly soon notices that Cleo has lost enthusiasm about the trip and later finds her crying. Cleo reveals that she is pregnant with Joel's baby. Mulkerrin explained that Cleo is "overwhelmed, she's scared, and she's apprehensive", as she is still a teenager and has not been with Joel for long. Cleo chooses not to tell Joel straight away and she confides in Myra and Nana instead. Joel soon overhears them talking about the pregnancy, leaving Cleo feeling guilty for not telling him sooner. Mulkerrin admitted to being "really excited" about the storyline, as she had previously played a young mother in Waterloo Road and enjoyed working with babies. However, Cleo later chooses to have an abortion. She is prompted to make her decision when Joel is arrested for Bart's murder. He then reveals that Warren killed Bart.

=== Bulimia nervosa ===
The character's third issue-led storyline started airing in December 2017. Cleo develops bulimia nervosa after learning Joel is now in a relationship with Sienna Blake. At home, she binges on food and then makes herself sick. Mulkerrin said Cleo's bulimia is caused by her feeling "like an outsider", and the binging helps her feel like she is still in control. The show is working with the charity Beat on the storyline and they hope to increase awareness of the topic. Mulkerrin met with a bulimia sufferer and carried out her own research, so that she can portray the scenes as accurately as possible.

Cleo's bulimia battle comes to a head during her wedding to Joel, which occurs in a special episode airing on World Mental Health Day. The episode sees Cleo talking about her day with psychiatrist Farrah Maalik (Krupa Pattani). Farrah has to stop Cleo and ask her to tell the truth, as it is shown that she is lying in a hospital bed. Cleo has developed a "skewed and idealistic view on events", so while she thinks the day went well, in reality she woke up full of "self-loathing", had a run, purged after eating a bacon sandwich, covered up her numerous injuries, and had to pin her wedding dress to fit. Shortly after saying their vows, Cleo collapses to the ground and is told that she has suffered a heart attack.

=== Departure ===
On 20 May 2022, Mulkerrin confirmed she was leaving Hollyoaks permanently. Mulkerrin's exit from the show was initially reported to be temporary as she is expecting her second child. Mulkerrin stated that she had enjoyed her eight years with the serial and being part of the McQueen family. She continued: "I have been blessed with so many incredible storylines, arriving with the Pete and Cleo storyline, the powerful sexual abuse storyline, and then the impactful bulimia storyline which crescendo'd on my wedding day to my real-life fiancé, meeting Rory, and joining at 21 and leaving eight years later its been an incredibly special job. I feel like I will miss everybody so much and it will always have a special place in my heart. I'm ready to close the chapter and move on to the next challenge in my career and I'm just grateful for the brilliant time I've had at Hollyoaks." Cleo's exit storyline sees her depart the village for a research project in India.

=== Coercive control and domestic violence ===
The plot of coercive control and domestic violence were commonly foreshadowed throughout Abe's introduction. On 21 May 2024, it was revealed the Hollyoaks production team had made a deal with Home Office to "join forces" to produce a coercive control storyline involving Abe and Cleo. Home Office had previously worked with Hollyoaks to produce Maxine Minniver (Nikki Sanderson)'s abuse from an incel group led by Eric Foster (Angus Castle-Doughty). The plot would be one of summer 2024's central focus points. It was followed up with a report that Hollyoaks would be continuing with the domestic violence plot as well as the coercive control. It was reported the soap's partnership with Home Office will "shine a light" on the harmful behaviours that can occur within controlling relationships and demonstrate the impact of violence on victims. Home Secretary James Cleverly, reacting to the upcoming plot, said: "Tackling violence against women and girls is a real priority for me. We know that controlling and coercive relationships can have a lasting and severe impact on victims. That's why we made it a specific criminal offence and are making sure those convicted are monitored by the police in the same way as physically violent offenders. By partnering with Hollyoaks, we're raising awareness of how to recognise these behaviours as well as empowering the public to call out abuse when they see it and safely intervene when appropriate." The partnership would first be brought to life on screen on the week beginning 20 May and will be highlighted again in early July. Mulkerrin has spoken out numerously on the plot. The first notable scene will include Abe being violent towards Cleo after Joel and Leela's wedding.

"I think [her relationship with Abe] is really quite worrying and we've got lots of red flags happening. This is the classic tropes of sort of an abusive relationship – it doesn't have to be obvious, it can be controlling and coercive control. I think that's the story we're telling though – how sometimes something can be right in front of your eyes but you can’t see it and you’re asking yourself, 'Am I going crazy?'. He's so good at gaslighting her and love-bombing her and manipulating her, so he is a very dangerous individual."

— Nadine Mulkerrin on her relationship with Abe (2024)

== Reception ==
For her portrayal of Cleo, Mulkerrin was voted Best Newcomer at the 2015 Digital Spy Reader Awards. Of her win, Daniel Kilkelly stated, "Joining a soap and being handed the biggest issue-based storyline of the year is no easy challenge, but young Hollyoaks actress Nadine Mulkerrin did herself proud this year – with truthful and sensitive performances as abused teen Cleo McQueen." Mulkerrin was included in the longlist for Best Actress at The British Soap Awards 2016. The following year, she received a nomination for Best Female Dramatic Performance. Mulkerrin was also included on the longlist for Best Actress at the 2017 Inside Soap Awards. In 2018, Mulkerrin earned a nomination in the Best Female Dramatic Performance category at The British Soap Awards 2018. She also received another nomination for Best Actress at the Inside Soap Awards 2018, and another nomination in the Best Soap Actor (Female) category at the 2018 Digital Spy Reader Awards, where she came in third place with 15.2% of the total vote. Cleo's bulimia story also received a nomination under the Best Soap Storyline category; it came in seventh place with 7.7% of the total votes. In 2025, Cleo and Sienna received a "Best Soap Couple" nomination at the Digital Spy Reader Awards. Mulkerrin was longlisted for "Best Actress" at the 2026 Inside Soap Awards, whilst "Cleo's postpartum psychosis" was longlisted for "Best Storyline".

Anthony Langford, writing for NewNowNext, thought the Harry and Cleo pairing was "cute" and that they were a "likeable" couple. However, as Harry was gay, Langford did not think their relationship would end happily, saying "Cleo is the clingy type and can be a bit unstable. I don't think she's going to take it very well when the truth comes out." Michael Cregan of Inside Soap praised Mulkerrin's performance. He highlighted Cleo's attempt to stop Reenie from drinking as "an outstanding scene" and said "We've always been a fan of Zoe Lucker, but young Nadine Mulkerrin gives her a run for her money. The following year, another contributor to Inside Soap praised Mulkerrin and Nicole Barber-Lane for their performances during Pete's trial, saying "They share a powerful scene where Cleo finally realises the truth."

Duncan Lindsay of Metro praised the sex abuse storyline, writing "Our hearts ached for Cleo and her vulnerability, we screamed at the television as Pete convincingly groomed her and the emotional and raw reactions around the revelations and accusations of abuse among the McQueens were jaw-droppingly powerful." When Cleo begins taking heroin, Johnathon Hughes of Radio Times branded her "the good girl gone bad". Hughes also noticed that there was "a distinct spark" between Cleo and Joel. Sally Brockway from Soaplife commented that Cleo had "a habit of falling hopelessly in love with inappropriate men." Laura Morgan, writing for Digital Spy, included Cleo and Joel in her feature on the eight characters to watch out for. She noted that the couple "look friggin' awesome together" and found their relationship "intriguing", as Joel was hiding secrets from Cleo.

Coryon Gray, writing for TVSource Magazine, called Cleo "the best of the McQueen bunch." He thought that due to her "unassuming" personality, she was easy to miss, so her family did not realise how much she was struggling when she began using heroin. Gray stated, "My guess is that they've left Cleo to her own devices simply because she's usually so strong-willed, so independent and keen on doing things her own way. When it comes to Cleo, one can usually trust her to be okay but she's so far from okay right now." Gray was also a fan of Cleo and Joel, dubbing them "forbidden lovers" and naming their relationship as one of his favourites. He added that the pairing was "already much more intriguing than Cleo and sweet but boring Nathan could have ever brought to the table." Sophie Dainty of Digital Spy pointed out that Cleo has experienced "her fair share of turmoil" since joining the soap and described her sexual abuse storyline as "harrowing". In 2024, Daniel Kilkelly from Digital Spy opined that Cleo's returned was welcomed and speculated that her love triangle with Leela and Joel would be "another big plot", explaining, "All three characters provide a likeable and warm presence in the show, so fans are likely to be torn over which way they want this one to go".
