= Hollyoaks Later series 5 =

Hollyoaks Later
- Series 5
- No. of episodes: 5

Release
- Original network: E4
- Original release: 17 September – 21 September 2012

Series chronology
- ← Previous; Series 4 Next → Series 6

The fifth series of Hollyoaks Later is a British television series and late night spin-off of Channel 4 soap opera Hollyoaks. The series aired between 17 September and 21 September 2012.

== Development ==
It was officially confirmed that Hollyoaks Later had been recommissioned for a fifth series on 16 May 2012. The series was filmed over the Summer of 2012. Emma Smithwick, producer of the series, revealed that the production team began planning Hollyoaks Later a "long time before its usual prep time" so that it was "wholly rooted into the main show and that it took the characters to new levels without alienating them in the main show". It was revealed that Brendan Brady (Emmett J. Scanlan) would make his Hollyoaks Later debut while Mitzeee (Rachel Shenton) who had appeared in previous series would also appear. It was later announced that another storyline would feature scenes with British rapper Lethal Bizzle playing himself. The scenes feature the artist performing for a special VIP gig which Hollyoaks fans were offered the chance to attend. It was revealed that these scenes would feature Bart McQueen (Jonny Clarke), Jono (Dylan Llewellyn) and Neil Cooper (Tosin Cole). Scenes featuring Bart, Jono and Neil were shot on location in Amsterdam, with Smithwick commenting that these scenes tackle "light and shade in the same strand". It was later announced that Theresa McQueen (Jorgie Porter) would feature in the series playing a "big part" in the storylines. Neil Newbon, who plays Walker, confirmed that he would be appearing in the series. He said that the series will be "absolute dynamite", adding that it will be unlike anything audiences have "ever seen before in the show". Scanlan confirmed that Bronagh Waugh and Andrew Still who play Cheryl Brady and Joel Dexter will appear in the series in the storyline containing Brendan and Walker.

Marianne Buckland, commissioning editor for Channel 4, said that the series would be "more dark and dangerous than ever" due to Brendan appearing. Smithwick explained that the series is "very much an exploration of the Bradys - what makes them who they are as individuals, but also as siblings". Smithwick said that Joel and Walker's participation in the storyline gives way to a "whole host of material that [the audience] will not be able to miss". She went on to add that the past of the Brady family will be explored which will include the introduction of Brendan and Cheryl's grandmother. Scanlan has said that the series "builds very, very nicely throughout all five episodes". He explained that during the concluding episodes of Hollyoaks Later will take the "storyline to a new level of darkness and black comedy". He added that the series will feature "some very daring stuff, very ballsy stuff that I don't think has ever been done on Hollyoaks before", explaining that he does not believe Hollyoaks has "been this graphic". Scanlan said that the storyline throughout the series escalates and is a "hard-hitting, right in your face" storyline. On how Brendan is affected, Scanlan explained the episodes "catapult the character into actions that you just wouldn't expect".

On 5 September 2012 it was announced the fifth series of Hollyoaks Later would air nightly from 17 September to 21 September at 10pm. A trailer for the series was later released, followed by a 12-minute preview of the first episode on E4.com on 14 September.

== Plot ==
Brendan Brady (Emmett J. Scanlan) and Joel Dexter (Andrew Still) kidnap Joel's stepfather Mick (Gavin Marshall) due to his repeated domestic abuse of Joel's mother. Cheryl Brady (Bronagh Waugh) convinces Brendan to visit their grandmother Nana Flo (Sharon Morgan) who has cancer. While being transported from a psychiatric hospital, Mitzeee is handcuffed to Lauren (Emmanuella Cole) who manages to escape, forcing Mitzeee to go with her. Bart McQueen (Jonny Clarke), Jono (Dylan Llewellyn) and Neil Cooper (Tosin Cole) travel to Amsterdam to meet Lola (Lola Créton), who Jono met through the internet.

== Cast ==
Character	Actor	Reference
Mitzeee	Rachel Shenton	
Brendan Brady	Emmett J. Scanlan	
Walker	Neil Newbon	
Cheryl Brady	Bronagh Waugh	
Joel Dexter	Andrew Still	
Theresa McQueen	Jorgie Porter	
Bart McQueen	Jonny Clarke	
Martin "Jono" Johnson	Dylan Llewellyn	
Neil Cooper	Tosin Cole	
Nancy Osborne	Jessica Fox	
Riley Costello	Rob Norbury	
Sinead O'Connor	Stephanie Davis	
Mercedes Fisher	Jennifer Metcalfe	
Charlie Dean	Charlie Behan	
Bobby Costello	Jakob Chialton	
Mick	Gavin Marshall	
Lola	Lola Créton	
Nana Flo	Sharon Morgan	
Lauren	Emmanuella Cole	
Lethal Bizzle	Himself	
Nate Tenbury-Newent	Tom Turner	
Shawnee	Josie Taylor	
Dave	Spencer Jones	

== Reception ==
Laura Morgan of All About Soap commented positively on the concluding episode of the series saying "we think it’s safe to say they saved the best till last. It was scandalous, scary, shocking and… well, frankly, blinkin’ brilliant!" She added that Emmett J Scanlan’s portrayal of Brendan was "off the scale" during the series, saying she felt that there were several "jaw-dropping" Brendan scenes. Morgan went on to say that "we were on the edge of our seats as Mitzeee finally caught up with evil nemesis Mercy, and held a knife to her throat, and left shouting at our TV screens when foolish Theresa decided a life on the run with bad boy Joel was preferable to staying in Hollyoaks and looking after Kathleen Angel. Shot like a slick movie, Hollyoaks Later had a bit of everything, and we’re gutted that it’s all over for another year… Talk about going out with a bang, though!" Inside Soap columnist Sarah said that viewers of the series will "no doubt be hooked" like herself, adding that the series ends on "a massive cliffhanger that will leave you on the edge of your seat!"
