= In with the Flynns =

2011 British TV sitcom series

- Genre: Sitcom
- Created by: Caryn Mandabach; Bill Martin; Mike Schiff
- Written by: Bill Martin; Mike Schiff; Chris Reddy
- Directed by: Dominic Brigstocke; Ben Kellett
- Starring: Will Mellor; Niky Wardley; Warren Clarke; Graeme Hawley; Orla Poole; Billy Matthews; Craig Parkinson; Jordan Hill; Nadine Rose Mulkerrin; Daniel Rogers; Lorenzo Rodriguez; Kevin Gray
- Opening theme: Beady Eye - "For Anyone"
- Country of origin: United Kingdom
- Original language: English
- No. of series: 2
- No. of episodes: 12

Production
- Executive producers: Caryn Mandabach; Jamie Glazebrook; Jon Wolph
- Producers: Gill Isles; Jim Poyser
- Production location: dock10 studios
- Running time: 30 minutes
- Production company: Caryn Mandabach Productions

Original release
- Network: BBC One; BBC HD; BBC One HD
- Release: 8 June 2011 – 21 September 2012

In with the Flynns is a British sitcom created by Caryn Mandabach, produced by Caryn Mandabach Productions, and broadcast by the BBC. The first series began broadcast on 8 June 2011 for six episodes on BBC One and in high definition on BBC One HD in the United Kingdom. It is an adaptation of the American series Grounded for Life.

Set in Manchester in northern England, the series stars Will Mellor as Liam Flynn, Niky Wardley as his wife Caroline, and Nadine Rose Mulkerrin, Daniel Rogers, and Lorenzo Rodriguez as their children, Chloe, Steve, and Mikey. Other characters include Liam's brother Tommy (Craig Parkinson) and Liam and Tommy's father Jim (Warren Clarke).

The working title of Meet the Doyles was changed during production. The theme song is "For Anyone" by the band Beady Eye.

On 22 December 2011, Will Mellor confirmed in an interview that the show had been given a second series, which was filmed and broadcast in 2012. Taping took place at the new dock10, MediaCityUK and the second series, of six episodes, began on BBC One on 17 August 2012.

On 30 October 2012, it was reported that BBC One had cancelled In with the Flynns.

== Production ==
The series is set in Manchester in the north of England, but as with many British sitcoms, it was filmed in front of a live studio audience in London, in this case at Teddington Studios. The show is written by a team of writers, giving it a feel of an American comedy. The show makes frequent use of flashbacks to portray past events mentioned in the dialogue. A first series containing six episodes aired on BBC One throughout June and July 2011. A second series containing six episodes aired again on BBC One from 17 August 2012.

== Characters ==
- Will Mellor as Liam Flynn, husband to Caroline and father of three children, Liam is a doting father and a loving husband. Although he and Caroline were married when they were teenagers, they are still very much in love.
- Niky Wardley as Caroline Flynn, Liam's wife and mother of three children. Caroline loves her children and her husband greatly, and she is forced to tolerate Liam's brother and father living in her house, although she rarely complains about them.
- Warren Clarke as Jim Flynn, Liam, Tommy and Kevin's widowed father. He is a fan of fishing, and is often seen boring his family with his stories. He does not like Caroline's family and is always trying to impress his grandchildren.
- Craig Parkinson as Tommy Flynn (Series 1), Liam's older brother is a freeloading workshy man who sleeps on Liam's sofa, much to Liam and Caroline's disapproval. In Series 2, Tommy has run away with his little brother Kevin's fiancée and it is presumed that the Flynns have lost contact with him.
- Orla Poole (2011) / Nadine Rose Mulkerrin (2012) as Chloe Flynn
- Daniel Rogers (2011–12) as Steve Flynn
- Lorenzo Rodriguez as Mikey Flynn
- Alex Carter as Kevin Flynn, Liam's younger brother (Series 2), he comes to live with his father Jim when his brother, Tommy, runs away with his fiancée. He remains fearful of women., and has a gambling habit.
- Beverley Callard as Pat, the mother of Caroline (Series 2).
- Paul Copley as Alan, the father of Caroline (Series 2). Pat and Alan live in Spain.

== Reception ==
The first episode brought mixed reviews from television critics. The Telegraph's James Walton commented negatively "this is exactly the kind of sitcom that comedies such as The Royle Family and Outnumbered are meant to have seen off long ago - and whose strange persistence traditionally fills critics with a mixture of puzzlement and dismay". However, he went on to praise the performances of the cast, and called it "a perfectly acceptable 30 minutes of undemanding television". In much the same way, the Guardian's reviewer Zoe Williams called it "bland, smooth and unremarkable" and "the acting is not great" but she also acknowledged that the problem was the set-up: "if they want us to fall in love with the Flynns...they need to be a bit more like actual people". One more positive review came from Metro, who said "Don't set your expectations too high. It's not completely terrible, and has a decent cast...Maybe it’ll settle into a more chucklesome formula once this set-up episode’s out of the way.

Series two of the show was also criticized by some commentators. Sam Wollaston of The Guardian wrote, "The BBC's in With the Flynns feels like a tired, lame sitcom because it is a tired, lame sitcom.", while Phil Harrison of Time Out wrote, "Sky has thrown down the gauntlet to the BBC lately. Daring dramas, comedies that actually raise a chuckle and even the annexation of one of the Beeb's comedy crown jewels in Alan Partridge. How will Auntie respond? With a second series of piss-weak sitcom in with the Flynns, that's how.... the dialogue is flat, the jokes telegraphed and the characterisation superficial". However, Emma Sturgess, also writing for The Guardian, was more positive; "...although in with the Flynns is pretty broad, it's not total carp".

== Episodes ==
=== Series One (2011) ===
No.	Title	Directed by	Written by	Original release date	Viewers (millions)
1	"Santorini"	Dominic Brigstocke	Chris Reddy, George Jeffrie, Simon Nye	8 June 2011	4.09m
Young parents Liam and Caroline Flynn are working extra shifts to save up for a holiday, but who is looking after the kids? Chloe gets a piercing in her tongue, Steve has a run-in with the school bully, and Mikey eats food left out the back of restaurants. This is all because Liam's brother Tommy fills the breach, with his own idiosyncratic brand of parenting. Meanwhile, Liam's dad Jim has met a woman at a car-boot sale. She seems perfect, but Caroline thinks she has met her before, and that Jim's romantic intentions are doomed to failure. Can they warn him before he makes a move?
2	"The Birthday Treat"	Dominic Brigstocke	Chris Reddy, George Jeffrie, Simon Nye	15 June 2011	3.98m
Liam catches Chloe snogging the lad from next door and reacts badly, throwing a milkshake at them. A humiliated Chloe is furious with her dad, but the more Liam tries to patch things up, the worse things get.Meanwhile, Caroline wonders if she'll ever get out to celebrate her birthday, and Jim winds up in trouble with Psycho Trev from the Wheatsheaf.
3	"The Hardest Cut"	Dominic Brigstocke	Chris Reddy, George Jeffrie, Simon Nye	22 June 2011	3.61m
Following a pregnancy scare, Liam resolves to have the snip, but wimps out at the last minute. Keeping the truth from Caroline, however, becomes increasingly difficult. Grandad Jim discovers that Mikey has shoplifted a toy gun. He takes Mikey back to the shop to confess and pay up, but his endeavour is frustrated by the shopkeeper from hell. Meanwhile Chloe thinks she has found true love, but Caroline suspects it is all in her mind.
4	"Wild at Heart"	Dominic Brigstocke	Bill Martin, George Jeffrie, Bert Tyler-Moore	29 June 2011	3.57m
Liam finds out that Chloe's got a fake ID and plans to go to a flash party. He sets off with Tommy to find her, only to discover she's been one step ahead of him all along. Meanwhile, Caroline is fed up with Jim's bad behaviour whenever he visits the hotel where he works. When an opportunity for revenge presents itself, she starts to concoct a plan.
5	"Guitar"	Dominic Brigstocke, Stephen Conwell	Daniel Peak, George Jeffrie, Bert Tyler-Moore	6 July 2011	3.52m
Liam buys a guitar with some money that Chloe thinks should be spent on her school ski trip. A battle of wills ensues, with Liam resolving not to cave in to his daughter, and Chloe determined to go on that holiday. Meanwhile, Mikey walks in on his parents in flagrante. Caroline is mortified, but her bigger problem is how to stop Liam telling everyone about it.
6	"Whistleblowing"	Stephen Conwell	Daniel Peak, George Jeffrie, Simon Nye	13 July 2011	3.02m
Liam is fed up with Uncle Tommy sleeping on the front room couch. Tommy says he is avoiding a stalky ex-girlfriend, but Liam decides it is time to move him on and secretly invites the woman in question to come round. Meanwhile, Jim forces a reluctant Mikey to take up football. But his efforts to give the lad confidence backfire when Mikey's success goes to his head.

=== Series Two (2012) ===
A second series was confirmed on 22 December 2011 and was filmed and broadcast in 2012. There was one cast change, with Chloe Flynn being portrayed by Nadine Rose Mulkerrin instead of previous actress Orla Poole. In addition, the character of Tommy Flynn, portrayed by Craig Parkinson, was dropped and the character of a third brother, Kevin Flynn (portrayed by Alex Carter), was added for Series 2.

The series consists of six 30-minute episodes, and began broadcasting on 17 August 2012 on BBC One.

No.	Title	Directed by	Written by	Original release date	Viewers (millions)
1	"The Tandyman"	Ben Kellett	Simon Nye	17 August 2012	3.24m
A burglar is apprehended by Liam and Caroline in their house, where they lock him in the kitchen. They later discover that the burglar is someone they went to school with, who threatens to press charges for their undue force. Elsewhere, Jim Takes sole credit for catching a fish. Starring Graeme Hawley as Dave Tandy.
2	"Liam Flynn: Party Legend"	Ben Kellett	Simon Nye	24 August 2012	2.71m
The Flynns hold an anniversary party for Caroline's parents, Pat and Alan. Liam's patience and party skills are tested to the max, especially when the tactless Pat upsets Chloe by revealing some truths about her conception. Elsewhere, Kevin has an awkward reunion with a girl he last met at a funeral.
3	"Life is Sweat"	Ben Kellett	Simon Nye	31 August 2012	3.10m
Liam tries to earn some extra money by giving some personal training lessons, but matters quickly go awry when his first client wants more from him than just training. Meanwhile, Kevin is heartbroken when a girl breaks his heart after being together for two days and Caroline's parents discover online chat.
4	"You're Only Young Twice"	Ben Kellett	Simon Nye	7 September 2012	Under 3.57m
Jim attends an art class, but his painting of Liam and Caroline is unflattering. Liam becomes tiresome of his humdrum life and resolves to keep up with his younger brother Kevin by partying every night.
5	"Secrets and Wives"	Ben Kellett	Simon Nye	14 September 2012	Under 3.83m
Liam and Caroline agree to keep an eye on their neighbour's house while he is away. While exploring the house Liam has an accident and injures his neck. Jim thinks that thieving from his former employer is catching up with him.
6	"Frozen Assets"	Ben Kellett	Simon Nye	21 September 2012	Under 3.77m
The Flynns must all make personal sacrifices when they cannot afford to repair their broken boiler - but will Liam be able to give up his cable sports package? Caroline vouches for Jim at the hotel, but trouble brews after he gets fresh with the female customers.

== DVD release ==
A DVD of the first series of In with the Flynns was released on 3 September 2012.
