= Andrew Still (actor) =

Scottish actor (born 1993)

- Born: December 1993 (age 32); Glasgow, Scotland, United Kingdom
- Occupation: Actor
- Years active: 2011–
- Agent: Creative Artists Management
- Television: Hollyoaks; Coronation Street
- Height: 6 ft 1 in (185 cm)

Andrew Still (born December 1993) is a Scottish actor. After joining the Scottish Youth Theatre, he played Joel Dexter in the Channel 4 soap opera Hollyoaks from 2011 to 2013, also portraying the role in Hollyoaks Later in 2012. After working in various other occupations, Still then appeared in the series Outlander and Fried before playing Scott Fairchild on in the drama Waterloo Road in 2015. Still made his stage debut in National Theatre of Scotland's The James Plays trilogy (2016). In 2018, he took over the role of "Sick Boy" in Trainspotting Live. After appearing as Brian in the 2021 film Nobody Has to Know, Still played Rory Dashford in the series Granite Harbour in 2022. That December, he began appearing as the villain Justin Rutherford in a recurring guest role in the ITV soap opera Coronation Street, last appearing in October 2023. Still was nominated for "Best newcomer" at the 2012 TV Choice Awards for his Hollyoaks role as Joel and was longlisted for "Best Villain" at the 2023 Inside Soap Awards for his Coronation Street role as Justin, whilst Justin's storylines won and were nominated for several other awards.

== Life and career ==
Andrew Still was born in December 1993 and grew up in, Jordanhill, Glasgow. Still began acting from around the age of five, when he played the "grumpy sheep" in Scotstoun Primary School's Nativity play. When he was 15, he started taking part in plays with the Scottish Youth Theatre. Still also went to Art school as whilst he still wanted to pursue acting, he felt it was unrealistic.

In November 2011, after taking part in a Scottish Youth Theatre play that summer, Still began portraying Joel Dexter in the Channel 4 soap opera Hollyoaks. The casting opportunity had been sent to Scottish Youth Theatre, which was emailed to Still and prompted him to audition. Still was 17 years old when he began working on the soap. He had to complete two auditions for the role and found out that he had been successful on the way home from the second. He did not have an agent at the time but won the role regardless after impressing Hollyoaks bosses. Still had to keep the role a secret for two months after being cast. He relocated from Glasgow to Liverpool for the role and lived with several other cast members (Jonny Clarke, Calvin Demba, Laurie Duncan, Dylan Llewellyn and Tosin Cole) in a "big student house" located on Penny Lane, which Still said he enjoyed. Still said he found being on a soap "a culture shock" due to the differences from working in theatre but felt that he was in a "dream" being on the show. The character of Joel was introduced as a DJ and the son of gangster Warren Fox (Jamie Lomas), with Joel later becoming a "minor villain" and committing some crimes in his time on the soap. In 2012, Still was nominated for "Best newcomer" at the 2012 TV Choice Awards. That same year, Still appeared as Joel in the fifth series of the late night spinoff Hollyoaks Later. Still then departed as Joel from Hollyoaks, making his final appearance in January 2013.

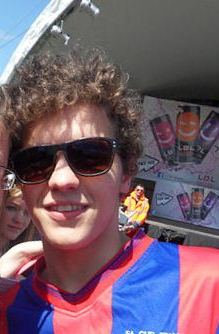
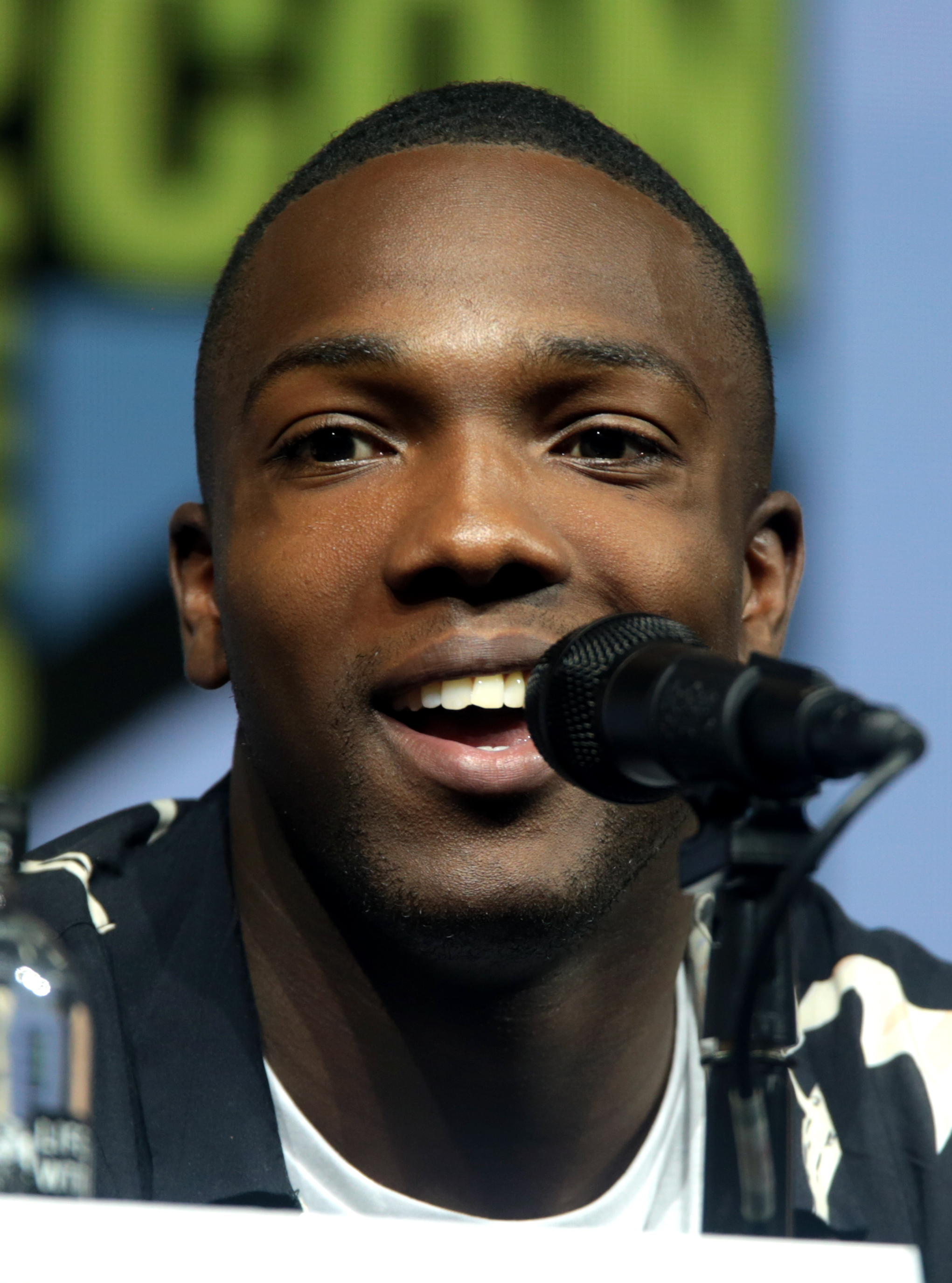
Whilst working on Hollyoaks, Still lived with several of his colleagues, including Dylan Llewellyn (left) and Tosin Cole (right).

After departing Hollyoaks, Still went through what he called a "famine period", which he later said he somewhat did not mind as he wanted to take a break. He struggled to secure other acting jobs, which he described as a "pretty rotten period" that taught him a lot about himself. Still considered quitting the profession altogether due to the struggle in getting roles. Still returned to and did some small jobs for Scottish Theatre Company, including working as a receptionist, a janitor and a handyman. Still was "thankful" for this, explaining that he found it "really humbling to not just sit back and go 'I'm an actor, acting is what I do' because a lot of the time it's a lot harder than it looks to act, but you need to pay the bills somehow." Still also said that after leaving Hollyoaks he would still get noticed in public. In 2014, Still portrayed Benjamin in one episode of Outlander, before appearing in the 2015 BBC comedy series Fried. Still portrayed "show baddie" and school bully Scott Fairchild in ten episodes of the tenth series of the British drama series Waterloo Road in 2015. Still said he enjoyed working with his co-star Charlotte Beaumont, saying that she taught him a lot. In 2016, Still portrayed various characters in National Theatre of Scotland's trilogy The James Plays. Still then took over the role of "Sick Boy" in the 2018 run of Trainspotting Live, based on Irvine Welsh's novel of the same name; the role had previously been played by Rory Douglas-Speed, who took over the role of Joel on Hollyoaks in 2016 and whom Still has mutual friends with. Still has also acted in various other theatre productions from various companies and short films.

In 2021, Still returned to screen and portrayed Brian in the film Nobody Has to Know before portraying Rory Dashford in the Scottish BBC drama Granite Harbour. In December 2022, it was announced that Still would play the recurring guest role of Justin Rutherford in the ITV soap opera Coronation Street, with his appearance airing that same month. After an initial cameo, Still began appearing more as Justin when Justin was involved in a storyline highlighting stalking. In his time in the soap, Justin stalks Daisy Midgeley (Charlotte Jordan) and then attempts an acid attack on her, which severely harms Ryan Connor (Ryan Prescott). Justin exited in 2023 when he went to prison, but Still reprised the role that same year, with the cameo return airing on 17 October. Justin's acid attack won "Scene of the Year" and "Best Single Episode" at the 2023 British Soap Awards, whilst Justin's stalking of Daisy was shortlisted for "Best Storyline" that same year. Still was longlisted for "Best Villain" at the 2023 Inside Soap Awards, whilst the acid attack and stalking storyline were shortlisted for "Best Storyline" and the acid attack won "Best Showstopper". Araminta Parker from OK! noted that Coronation Street fans were "full of praise for Andrew Still's thrilling portrayal of the villain" and that the actor "soared to fame" due to the "harrowing storyline". That same year, Still portrayed Ross Kincaid in the second series of the Scottish comedy drama Annika.

== Personal life ==
Still was born and raised in Glasgow and was living in its Jordanhill area when he received his Hollyoaks role. Whilst Still was in Liverpool, he felt homesick at times. Still said he likes to keep his personal life private from the media. As of December 2022, Still is in a relationship with a woman named Fi, who is also an actor. Still also enjoys music and played guitar in his friend's band, which Still attributed to helping him through a difficult period in his life.

== Filmography ==
| Year(s) | Title | Role | Notes | Ref |
|---|---|---|---|---|
| 2011–13 | Hollyoaks | Joel Dexter | Regular role | |
| 2012 | Hollyoaks Later | Joel Dexter | Regular role (series 5) | |
| 2014 | Outlander | Benjamin | One episode | |
| 2015 | Fried | Noah | TV series | |
| 2015 | Waterloo Road | Scott Fairchild | 10 episodes | |
| 2019 | Dark Road | John | Short film | |
| 2021 | Nobody Has to Know | Brian | Film | |
| 2022 | Granite Harbour | Rory Dashford | TV series | |
| 2022–23 | Coronation Street | Justin Rutherford | Recurring guest role | |
| 2023 | Annika | Ross Kincaid | Series 2 | |

== Other credits ==
=== Theatre ===
| Year(s) | Production | Role | Ref |
|---|---|---|---|
| Unknown | The Real Thing | Brodie/Understudy Billie | |
| 2016 | The James Plays | William Douglas/Ross/Cover Ramsay | |
| 2017 | Voices in Her Ear | Mark | |
| 2017 | The Last Ones | Pyotr | |
| 2018 | Trainspotting Live | Sick Boy | |
| 2022 | 10 Ten Things to Do Before You Die | Various | |

=== Workshops ===
| Production | Role | Director | Ref |
|---|---|---|---|
| The Blue Accordian | Sorley | Luke Kernaghan | |
| A Stranger Came Ashore | Robbie | Luke Kernaghan | |
