= Joel Dexter =

Fictional character from Hollyoaks

- Hollyoaks character
- Rory Douglas-Speed as Joel Dexter
- Portrayed by: Andrew Still (2011–2013); Rory Douglas-Speed (2016–2025)
- Duration: 2011–2013, 2016–2025
- First appearance: 22 November 2011
- Last appearance: 7 October 2025
- Introduced by: Gareth Philips (2011); Bryan Kirkwood (2016)
- Spin-off appearances: Hollyoaks Later (2012)
- Andrew Still as Joel Dexter
In-universe information
- Other names: Scottish Foxy
- Occupation: Disc jockey; Barman; Club owner; Drug dealer; Trainee priest; Mechanic; Firefighter
- Father: Warren Fox
- Mother: Marie Fielding
- Stepfather: Mick Cornus
- Half-brothers: Abe Fielding; Arlo Fielding; Sebastian Blake
- Half-sisters: Sophie Blake; Ella Richardson; Maria-Gabriella Fox-McQueen
- Wife: Leela Lomax (2024–2027)
- Sons: Noah Dexter; Joseph McQueen
- Daughters: Clara Dexter
- Stepsons: Daniel Lomax; Sid Sumner (adoptive)
- Stepdaughters: Peri Lomax
- Grandmothers: Norma Crow
- Aunts: Katy Fox

Joel Dexter is a fictional character from the British soap opera Hollyoaks. The character made his debut during the episode broadcast on 22 November 2011, portrayed by Andrew Still. Still was attending the Scottish Youth Theatre when Lime Pictures presented the establishment with a casting opportunity for Hollyoaks. The actor secured two auditions for the role and after the second audition he was offered the part. Joel has been characterised through themes of violence. He is on probation for assault, and he loses his temper with various characters. Despite this, Joel does not like domestic violence because his stepfather hit his mother. His dislike of such violence played a role in his early storylines. He was written out of the series in 2012 and departed on 9 January 2013. On 18 August 2016, it was confirmed that Joel would be returning to Hollyoaks with the role recast to Rory Douglas-Speed; he returned on 8 September 2016. Joel then made an unannounced departure on 21 May 2025. On 9 September 2025, it was announced that Rory Douglas-Speed had reprised his role as Joel for a guest stint. His return scenes are set to air in the coming weeks. Joel's return scenes aired on 17 September 2025.

Joel was originally introduced as a "mysterious newcomer" who is hiding a secret, with it being revealed that he is the long-lost son of established character Warren Fox (Jamie Lomas). Lomas had already announced his intention to leave the series and Joel played a role in Warren's departure storyline. Still has stated that when his character first arrived on-screen, he was "quite floaty" with nowhere to live. Joel was later given further connections to characters within the show, such as Brendan Brady (Emmett J. Scanlan), who gives him a "criminal education", and Theresa McQueen (Jorgie Porter), who he begins a relationship with. In May 2012, Joel was involved in a stabbing storyline. Still has spoken of his efforts to make the scenes in which Joel is stabbed as realistic as possible, as he felt that many people were victims of stabbing at the time. Upon the character returning to the show in 2016, his storylines haveincluded reuniting with his father, training to become a priest, being targeted by Sienna Blake (Anna Passey) as part of her revenge for her daughter's presumed death, being revealed as responsible for his aunt Katy Fox's (Hannah Tointon) death from a drug overdose and his relationship and later abandoned engagement to Cleo McQueen (Nadine Mulkerrin). Joel later started a relationship with Cleo's second-cousin, Goldie McQueen (Chelsee Healey).

Still's portrayal of Joel has earned him a "Best Newcomer" award. Anthony D. Langford from AfterElton opined that Joel was a "scrawny teenage boy" and that his storyline with Brendan was "quite laughable". While a Heat reporter said that Joel is a "smug" character. But a columnist from TV Choice said that Joel's stabbing was a "shockingly violent turn", and Laura Morgan from All About Soap branded the scenes "gruesome and dramatic".

== Casting ==
Andrew Still was cast into the programme after Lime Pictures, who produce the serial, presented the Scottish Youth Theatre with a casting opportunity. Although Still did not have any previous television acting experience, he impressed the casting department. Still had two auditions for the role and was offered the role on his way home from his second audition. Still revealed that when he was cast, he had to remain secretive for a period of two months. Still also said that the cast were "fantastic". Before his character debuted on-screen, Still revealed that he hoped to his character would remain in the series and become one of Hollyoaks' "staple characters".

== Development ==
=== Characterisation ===
"Joel is not the Angel he makes out to be. [...] The lad has a violent streak. For starters, he’s on probation. [...] The lad’s dangerous, no two ways about it. [...] But scratch the surface of that cool leather-clad exterior and you will see a soft, Scottish centre. He may be on probation, but the young jock has learnt from his mistakes. [...] He's so much more than a chip off the old block. He stands up for himself and he hates domestic violence. And he's probably the only guy who looks that hot in a battered leather jacket."

— A writer from E4.com describing Joel. (2012)

A writer from the official Hollyoaks website described Joel as a "whole lot of exciting things rolled into one". They said that he "immediately caused a stir" upon his arrival and that when he is not trying to outsmart Brendan Brady (Emmett J. Scanlan) he is "happy to cause trouble elsewhere". Joel is nicknamed "Scottish Foxy" which was coined by Brendan and Still himself loved the name. Joel is often seen sporting a leather jacket. Still told a reporter from the serial's official website that "I hate that leather jacket, I wear it every day, I hate it and it squeaks so much". He explained that it was a vintage item but since it had since been "beaten up" from various characters always pushing Joel "up against walls". He said that his ideal scene to represent Joel in the opening titles would be him "ironing his leather jacket, the inside of it, making it all nice for his day". Still has said that Joel began "quite floaty as a character" because he had no fixed home. He is searching for a missing connection and he "doesn't really have a focus in his life". The actor concluded that "he's got a tough outer shell, but inside he's quite vulnerable."

=== Introduction ===
He was initially described as a "mysterious newcomer" who would change the life of an established character "forever". Joel arrives to work as a dubstep DJ at Chez Chez at the same time Brendan disappears from the village. He is also planned to become part of a storyline in which fellow character Maddie Morrison (Scarlett Bowman) becomes attracted to him. However, Joel is uninterested as there is "only one person on his mind". On 15 November 2011, Digital Spy's Kilkelly reported that Maddie would attempt to use Joel by flirting to make Callum Kane (Laurie Duncan) jealous. Joel is not impressed and is "quite mean" to Maddie, Still told Kilkelly that Joel's outburst of anger was not a "one-off" because he does have a "quick temper". But Joel does have "conscience" and in one episode he was "ranting and raving" and the next he was "apologising straight away".

It was later announced that Joel's reason for coming to the village is Warren Fox (Jamie Lomas), who he believes to be his father. Sill stated that Joel is a great character because he is characterised as a "mysterious bad boy" who arrives "not really having any direction and is looking for his father". Joel doesn't have much in his life and he is searching for something that is missing. Warren is not impressed by Joel's arrival because he is "paranoid that Brendan sent Joel in to play with his mind". While Joel is essentially a "troublemaker" he has a "vulnerability because of what has happened in the past". Joel leaves for a while, but his return causes trouble and drama with "certain characters in around Chez Chez, perhaps with one Brendan Brady, they'll be clashing". Lomas told a writer from TVTimes that his character thinks that "this kid could be anybody's - he could be making it up or he could be after money". Joel shows Warren a picture of him and his mother, but feels that the evidence is insufficient.

In December 2011, series producer Emma Smithwick said that she thought Joel was "great and so dynamic" and that she was enjoying his on-screen presence. She added that he would "be involved heavily" in Warren's exit storyline. Warren and Brendan's feud culminates in Brendan and Mitzeee (Rachel Shenton) plotting to rid of Warren. Scanlan told a reporter from What's on TV that his character uses Joel "as a pawn" by "befriending the kid and winning his trust". He added that there is no proof that Joel is Warren's son, but that did not matter because he is "as he's still a way for Brendan to get to Warren".

Still thought it was "fantastic" to be given the opportunity to be involved with Warren's departure storyline. In the lead up to his on-screen father's exit, Joel accompanies him on a holiday in Paris. Still explained that upon their return, it is evident that they have are closer. He thought it was "interesting" because Warren did not want Joel to go with him, but it conjured up a "connection" between the father and son. But Brendan's scheming soon takes hold. Still told Kilkelly that when Joel first arrived "he wasn't getting any answers at all", so he chose to befriend Brendan in attempt to discover more about Warren. As he Joel and Warren have made a "connection", Still stated that "Brendan has kind of fallen by the wayside. Joel's very wary of Brendan now - especially after what his dad's told him, and what he's seen for himself." In the same episodes, Warren's relationship with Mitzeee is failing and he becomes violent towards her. The actor said that because Joel hates violence towards women after his experiences with his stepdad, Joel feels responsible to take the role of protecting Mitzeee from the violence. Warren's violence does not "sit well" with Joel and he faces a dilemma. He is brought to the realisation that Warren and Mitzeee's situation "mirrors his family life back home" and Joel finds it "hard" to deal with. Still added that "there'll be a big conflict for Joel as to whether he stands by his dad or stands by his principles".

=== Feuds and relationships ===
Producers gave Joel romantic links, mainly in the form of Joel's Theresa McQueen (Jorgie Porter). He also has a fling with Annalise Appleton (Tamaryn Payne) and "made eyes at" Ash Kane (Holly Weston). Joel and Theresa's relationship began with a flirtation. Still told Hendry from the Daily Record that it occurs "by nature" because she has a history with Warren, which is "mirrored" between them. Theresa is the "kind of girl" that gains Joel's attention. Porter explained that the two character get together as "clearly there's something between" them. But Joel has a fight with Theresa's ex-boyfriend Will Savage (James Atherton) and it "all goes wrong". She added that "Theresa's not impressed by Joel's jealous streak - but she's still got the hots for him".

In March 2012, Laura Morgan of All About Soap said that Joel would get a "criminal education" from Brendan. Joel later begins feuding with Callum and in one scene they have a fight. Joel's violent trait is played out once again when he attacks Doug Carter (PJ Brennan) to retrieve a package that Brendan has trusted Doug with. Brenndan told Digital Spy's Kilkelly that it was part of a "side-plot" between Joel and Brendan. Even though Joel cannot figure out what the deal is between Brendan and Doug - "he wants to be involved". He added that Joel is so "resentful over being left out of the loop" that he puts on a mask and attacks Doug and steals the package. In April 2012, a writer from Inside Soap reported that "bad boy" Joel would force Bart McQueen (Jonny Clarke) to grow cannabis plants. Clarke told the writer that his character does not know what he has agreed to do for Joel and is left feeling "unnerved".

=== Stabbing ===
In March 2012, Kilkelly reported that Joel would be injured in a new storyline. He noted that while it was unconfirmed, Still had been seen filming on location alongside Scanlan, covered in blood. Joel later tries to earn Brendan's respect. Still told a writer from What's on TV that Joel is desperate to impress Brendan because he is "young and naive and he's grown up without a male role model". As Warren is not around, Brendan is "fulfilling that role", but "basically Joel's a stupid little boy". Walker's (Neil Newbon) "shadowy and intellectual" persona intimidates Joel, he dislikes him because he becomes close to Brendan and that is something Joel is not a part of. Joel ultimately grows jealous. When they discover that Walker has been lying about his financial situation, Brendan recruits Joel to teach him a lesson. Still told Allison Slade from TVTimes that "it's really not a case of Brendan asking Joel to come on board; more that Joel nags his way into it. But he bites of more than he can chew." He sends Joel to pick up a package in return for money in "certainly not an above-board deal". Brendan knows that the men were "crazy" and Joel also realises that "all is not what it seems". Still stated that they treat him like a "piggy in the middle" and Joel grasps that they're nutters". He attempts to retrieve the money from them but Sampson (Sean Cernow) stabs him. Joel is "left in a bad way and his life is hanging in the balance". Joel's stabbing boosted ratings for the serial's "first look" edition airing on E4.

Still told Sally Brockway from Soaplife that filming the stabbing scenes was "intense". He was "determined" to make it look "real" because stabbings occurred often in his home town of Glasgow. Still said that he "wanted to get the severity of it across and prevent it from looking fake". He concluded that the storyline should have made Joel "see sense" and not be "in thrall" to Brendan. But noted that "you have to remember that Joel's a bit of an idiot".

In June 2012, Scanlan announced that Joel would feature in the fifth series of Hollyoaks Later alongside the characters of Brendan, Walker and Cheryl Brady (Bronagh Waugh). He added that their storyline would be "massive" and "hard-hitting".

=== Reintroduction and recast ===
In August 2016, Kilkelly reported that Joel would be returning to Hollyoaks with the role recast to Rory Douglas-Speed and that Joel has found God during his time away from the village and is now a trainee priest. Producers billed Joel as a man who's walking the road to redemption after his previous mistakes. Douglas-Speed commented: "I'm super chuffed to be a part of such a well-known and well received show. Everybody involved is amazing. I'm really excited to see how the character develops. Looking forward to the next chapter of my career.

=== Leela Lomax and tragic baby loss ===
In scenes from episode 6250, originally broadcast on 22 November 2023, it was revealed that Joel and Leela Lomax (Kirsty-Leigh Porter) had conceived. She initially didn't want to keep the baby as at the time they had recently fallen out over the return of Joel's ex-fianceè Cleo. Leela lied about an engagement to Cleo. On 21 May 2024, it was announced that Leela would go through a baby tragedy as scenes broadcast later in the month would show her experience baby loss. The storyline was partly replicated from Leigh-Porter's own baby-loss experience from December 2018. Leigh-Porter praised the storyline, claiming she was "not the same Kirsty" since losing her daughter Penny-Leigh. She also added she hoped it would "save a life". It was further reported that the loss would happen hours after their wedding. The scenes aired in episode 6382, originally broadcast on 24 May 2024. The scenes were branded "devastating", displaying usual chat with nurses about parenthood – the nurse required a second opinion before admitting Leela had lost her baby. The episode then featured silent credits to signify the loss. Douglas-Speed praised the plot and Porter's portrayal. When talking about Joel's future, he claimed that there would be "a lot of anger and aggression" as he would struggle to accept the loss.

"She came to the decision it would be healing for her, and a chance to speak to the community who have been through this, I'm so glad she had the confidence and bravery to do the storyline. Kirsty gives the performance of a lifetime - she is a powerhouse."

— Rory Douglas-Speed on Porter's portrayal on the tragic baby loss (2024)

== Storylines ==
=== 2011–2013 ===
Joel arrives to work as a new DJ at Chez Chez and on his first night at work he spends time with Maddie who comes on to him. He takes Maddie outside thinking she is going to sleep with him. As he tries to kiss her she pushes him off and he accuses her of playing games and shouts at her for teasing. He later threatens Callum Kane (Laurie Duncan) for criticising his treatment of Maddie. He argues with Warren who suspects that Brendan has sent him to the village, where he reveals that Warren is his father. Theresa convinces Joel to give Warren some time to come to terms with the situation. She also gets Warren to take a paternity test which reveals that he is Joel's biological father.

Joel and Warren decide to give each other a chance and get to know each other. Joel reveals that he spent time in a young offender's prison after he assaulted his violent stepfather who would abuse his mother. Joel agrees to go on holiday with Warren and his girlfriend Mitzeee where he bonds with Warren. Joel is shocked when Warren becomes forceful during an argument with Mitzeee. Joel tells Warren that he will not stand for violence against women because of his experiences with his stepfather. Joel pulls a gun on Brendan, who is trying to prevent Warren from killing Mitzeee. Brendan manages to talk Joel over and they stop Warren and get him arrested for murdering his ex. Joel attempts to comfort Mitzeee and when Brendan show no gratitude for Joel's help, he decides that he should leave. Joel goes to see Theresa McQueen (Jorgie Porter) before he leaves, who tells him that he should stay.

Joel returns and reveals that Warren has signed his share in the club to him. Brendan attempts to buy him out, but Joel tells him that the offer is too little. Mitzeee tries to help Brendan to get rid of Joel. Theresa goes on a date with Joel, which makes Will jealous. When Joel punches Will, Theresa tells him that she does not want to see him again. Brendan invites Joel to move in with him and makes an effort to befriend him. When Joel rebuffs Lacey Kane's (Georgia Bourke) advances because she is to young, and her brother Callum attacks Joel after Lacey pretends that he tried to kiss her. Joel tries to impress Brendan by running illegal errands for him. Brendan enlists Dave (Michael Camp) to beat Joel up during an errand, which Brendan does to test Joel. He later tries to become more involved with the business and sets up club night. Bart helps Joel set up for the night, but Bart invites many of his underage friends. When Joel learns that Callum has kissed Theresa, Joel attacks him and subsequently ruins his club night. Joel blames Bart and forces him to grow cannabis; while Brendan tells Joel he can no longer trust him. However, when Brendan's friend Walker (Neil Newbon) backs out of a dodgy deal - Joel goes along instead. Joel realises that he has walked into a trap and when he tries to escape he is stabbed. Joel is taken into hospital where Brendan apologises for putting him in danger. Joel is later kidnapped by Sampson (Sean Cernow) who ties his hands and puts a grenade in his hands. Brendan and Walker save him, but realise that Sampson used Joel as a distraction so they could vandalise Chez Chez.

=== 2016–2024 ===
Police officer Ryan Knight (Duncan James) questions Joel (now Rory Douglas-Speed) about Warren's role in the murder investigation of Patrick Blake (Jeremy Sheffield). Ryan knows Joel because he had previously spared Joel from drug charges. Joel reconnects with Warren before revealing himself as a practicing vicar. Joel later becomes a target by Patrick's daughter and Warren's girlfriend Sienna Blake (Anna Passey), who blames Warren for the death of her daughter Nico Blake (Persephone Swales-Dawson). Using a false name, Sienna tells him that she wants revenge on an abusive boyfriend who was responsible for her daughter's death, visiting the church regularly and growing closer to Joel. She invites him to a bar and tries to kiss him, but he rejects her. Subsequently, Sienna tricks Warren into thinking that she is being stalked by a man from the church. Whilst looking for the "stalker", Warren meets Joel again and they begin to revive their relationship.

After Joel discovers Sienna's true identity, she knocks him unconscious with his motorbike helmet and drags him into the garage, and accidentally sets the garage on fire. Warren soon discovers Sienna has trapped Joel in the flames. When Warren attempts to save Joel, the garage explodes and injures Sienna and Warren. The latter races back into the flames to save Joel from death. Sienna apologizes and tries to help Joel when his former friend from prison, Shane Sweeney (Lanre Malaolu) starts blackmailing him. It is revealed that Shane has a video of Joel, alongside Bart, giving his aunt Katy Fox (Hannah Tointon) drugs which resulted in an overdose that killed her. Shane threatens to show Warren the video if Joel doesn't give him money. Sienna later discovers that Shane is blackmailing him and frames Shane for kidnapping her, causing him to flee Hollyoaks but he sends Warren the video. Joel manages to delete it on time. Joel lies that Bart gave Katy the drug that killed her and Warren plans to kill Bart. Joel gives Bart money to flee Hollyoaks for good. Joel panics when he finds out that Warren murdered Bart and decides to tell the police. However, Sienna convinces him not too because she is pregnant with his twins.

Joel becomes closer to Bart's cousin Cleo McQueen (Nadine Mulkerrin) who has feelings for him. Joel freaks out when he thinks that he saw Bart. A concerned Cleo tracks him down at the church and they kiss. Joel decides to leave the church to be with Cleo. They decide to live a new life together and they head of on his motorbike. They almost collide with a car of teenagers driven by Cleo's cousin Prince McQueen (Malique Thompson-Dwyer) but Joel swerves to avoid them and Cleo is thrown down a grass verge while Joel falls of his motorbike. Emergency services fail to spot Cleo as she is hidden and Joel is unconscious so no one knows she is there. At the hospital, Joel asks Warren how Cleo is but Warren tells him Cleo wasn't with him. Joel rushes to the crash site and finds a barley conscious Cleo. Cleo is taken to hospital but she flatlines in the ambulance. Joel makes a promise with God, that if she survives then he will return to the church. Cleo survives, forcing Joel to stick to his promise. He tells Cleo that they can't be together, leaving Cleo heartbroken.

Cleo makes a pass at Warren to make Joel jealous but Sienna catches her, forcing her to admit the truth. Cleo lies to Joel saying that she has taken a heroin overdose. Joel thinks Shane is responsible and punches him. However, he is mortified when he finds out that Cleo is lying and Cleo begs Shane not to tell Warren the truth about Katy's death. Joel starts working with Darren Osborne (Ashley Taylor Dawson) to get rid of Shane for good. Shane realises that he has been set up and kidnaps Cleo as revenge. Shane takes Joel to where Cleo is and locks him in with her. While trapped, they have a heart to heart and have sex, agreeing to get back together. Darren arrives and saves them and they escape but Shane gives chase. They run along a cliff edge and Shane grabs Cleo threatening to throw her off. Joel charges at him and they fall off the edge onto the rocks below. Joel wakes up but they realise Shane is dead and they leave him there. Later, Joel and Cleo feel guilty so they go back but are shocked when his body disappears. Joel is branded a killer by Prince and he attacks Joel but is stopped by his brother Hunter McQueen (Theo Graham). Cleo's aunt Myra McQueen (Nicole Barber-Lane) is also unhappy with their relationship but Cleo tells her that their in love.

Joel and Cleo make plans to move to Tanzania to do volunteer work. Cleo seems to be less happy about leaving and reveals to her friend Holly Cunningham (Amanda Clapham) that she is pregnant. Joel walks in on Cleo telling Myra and leaves. He tells Warren that Cleo is pregnant and Warren convinces him to be there for his child. Joel and Cleo later meet up and they decide to stay in Chester and have the baby. Bart's body is found and Joel tells Cleo the truth, leaving her furious. She forgives Joel and they plan to run away. Before they can leave, Joel is arrested by police after Myra reports him. Joel is released and finds Cleo outside the hospital. He is devastated when she reveals that she had an abortion. Myra shows Warren the footage of Joel supplying Katy with the drugs and a furious Warren attacks Joel, before tying him up in the garage. Joel apologises but Warren says he is going to kill him but is stopped by Tony Hutchinson (Nick Pickard). Warren kidnaps one if his twins and Joel tries to stop him but lets him go.

Joel supports Sienna through her cancer battle and helps her take care if Sebastian. At Christmas, they kiss but Sienna collapses from a chest infection. She recovers but confides in Joel that her hair is falling out and Joel helps cut her hair. Joel and Sienna sleep together and Sienna feels self conscious about losing her hair but Joel helps by taking her out on New Year's Eve. They kiss which is witnessed by Cleo. Joel becomes concerned when Sienna tries to set him up with Maxine Minniver (Nikki Sanderson) and she tells them that she wants them to be parents to Sebastian when she is gone. However, they are delighted when doctors tell her that she is in remission.

== Reception ==
For his portrayal of Joel, Still was nominated for "Best Newcomer" at the 2012 TV Choice Awards. A writer from TV Choice said that Joel was "well out of his depth trying to run Warren's half of Chez Chez"; they added that his dealings with Bart formed an "unholy alliance". A writer from Heat said that Joel is a "smug" character and his flirting with Theresa was an "ultimate cringe moment". Inside Soap's Laura-Jayne Tyler branded Joel an "impressionable" character. On Joel's stabbing storyline, a writer from Reveal said that "this is an exciting and dangerous week for Joel, his eagerness to fit in with Brendan and show him he's capable of being the gangster he aspires to be lands him in grave danger." While a columnist from TV Choice revisited their sentiments that Joel was "out of his depth" - but this time with Walker and added that his stabbing was a "shockingly violent turn". All About Soap's Morgan said that Still was "incredible" throughout Joel's stabbing storyline and a "shocking climax" to the episode. The writer gave praise to Hollyoaks for making the "gruesome scenes so dramatic" because it left her feeling as though she was viewing "a proper gangster movie". She said that the "cocky, impressionable teen" Joel just wanted to be Brendan's "right-hand man", but "while we love his swagger and steely determination, we’re not convinced Joel’s ready for a life of hardened criminal activity just yet." Morgan added that Still "hit the nail on the head" when he said that Joel cannot "stand up against the big dogs".

Anthony D. Langford from AfterElton said that the show was not being credible expecting viewers to believe that "this scrawny teenage boy" is a "worthy opponent for Brendan". He added Joel should have been treated as "just a minor nuisance" and he hoped that Hollyoaks would end the storyline because it was "really quite laughable". Langford later expressed his delight at Joel's exit from the show, saying "I have never liked Joel. He was an ill-conceived, pointless character from the start. The show should have never brought him on as Warren's son, especially with Warren leaving the show. I guess they had planned to make him a nemesis for Brendan, but the actor simply didn't have what it took to go up against someone with the caliber of Emmett Scanlan. Moreover, Joel was always kind of wimpy and failed at every attempt to be a bad ass." Langford added that he did not like the way the writers tried to turn Brendan into a surrogate father for Joel, noting that Brendan would have squashed him like a gnat months ago. Araminta Parker from OK! wrote that Joel "had a turbulent time" in his initial stint, and called his kidnapping "dramatic". In 2024, Daniel Kilkelly from Digital Spy speculated that Joel's love triangle with Cleo and Leela would be "another big plot", explaining, "All three characters provide a likeable and warm presence in the show, so fans are likely to be torn over which way they want this one to go".
