= Nadine Mulkerrin =

English actress (born 1993)

- Born: Nadine Rose Mulkerrin; 23 June 1993 (age 33); Leeds, West Yorkshire, England
- Education: York College
- Occupation: Actress
- Years active: 2007–present
- Television: Hollyoaks (2015–2022, 2024–present)
- Partner(s): Rory Douglas-Speed (2018–present; engaged)
- Children: 2

Nadine Rose Mulkerrin (born 23 June 1993) is an English actress, known for playing Cleo McQueen in the Channel 4 soap opera Hollyoaks from 2015 until 2022 and since 2024. For her portrayal of Cleo, she has been nominated for Best Female Dramatic Performance at the British Soap Awards three times.

== Early and personal life ==
Nadine Rose Mulkerrin was born on 23 June 1993 in Leeds, West Yorkshire. Mulkerrin went to school at St. Mary's Catholic Comprehensive School in West Yorkshire. In 2010 and at 17 years old, she left school in pursuit of a career in acting. She attended York College and graduated in 2011, after earning a National Diploma in acting. While at York College, she auditioned for the Academy of Live and Recorded Arts, who offered her a place. However, she declined and "chose not to go down the drama school route".

Mulkerrin and her Hollyoaks co-star Rory Douglas-Speed announced their engagement in December 2018. In June 2019, they announced that they were expecting their first child, and their son was born on 15 October 2019. On 25 December 2021, Mulkerrin and Douglas-Speed announced that they were expecting their second child, and their second son was born on 24 May 2022.

== Career ==
Mulkerrin made her television debut in an episode of the ITV medical drama The Royal, and later made guest appearances in Waterloo Road, In with the Flynns and Doctors. From 2013 to 2015, she played the role of Ashley in the BBC sitcom Still Open All Hours. Also in 2015, it was announced that Mulkerrin had been cast as series regular Cleo McQueen in the Channel 4 soap opera Hollyoaks. In 2017, Mulkerrin was nominated for Best Female Dramatic Performance at the British Soap Awards for her portrayal of Cleo. She was then nominated in the same category at the 2018 and 2019 ceremony. Mulkerrin exited her role as Cleo in May 2022. She returned to her role as Cleo in January 2024 on Hollyoaks full time as part of the Collision Stunt Week. She also appeared in an episode of Casualty in February 2024.

== Filmography ==
Year	Title	Role	Notes
2007	The Royal	Lucy Hibbert	Episode: "Love & Loss"
2011	Waterloo Road	Billie Taylor	1 episode
2011	Inbred	Sam	Film
2012	In with the Flynns	Chloe	Recurring role
2013	Doctors	Tara Finley	Episode: "The Good Father"
2013	Starlings	Deb	1 episode
2014	The Break Ups	Marie	Short film
2013–2015	Still Open All Hours	Ashley	Recurring role
2015	Urban & The Shed Crew	Amber	Film
2015–2022, 2024–present	Hollyoaks	Cleo McQueen	Series regular
2024	Casualty	Roisin	1 episode

== Awards and nominations ==
Year	Award	Category	Result	Ref.
2015	Digital Spy Reader Awards	Best Newcomer	Won	
2016	British Soap Awards	Best Actress	Nominated	
2017	British Soap Awards	Best Female Dramatic Performance	Nominated	
2017	Inside Soap Awards	Best Actress	Nominated	
2018	British Soap Awards	Best Female Dramatic Performance	Nominated	
2018	Inside Soap Awards	Best Actress	Nominated	
2018	I Talk Telly Awards	Best Soap Performance	Nominated	
2018	Digital Spy Reader Awards	Best Soap Actor (Female)	Third	
2019	British Soap Awards	Best Female Dramatic Performance	Nominated	
2021	I Talk Telly Awards	Best Soap Partnership (shared with Bobby Gordon)	Nominated	
