= Rory Douglas-Speed =

Scottish actor (b. 1992)

- Born: 7 April 1992 (age 34); Cupar, Scotland, United Kingdom
- Occupation: Actor
- Years active: 2016–present
- Known for: Hollyoaks (2016–2025)
- Partner(s): Nadine Mulkerrin (2018–present; engaged)
- Children: 2

Rory Douglas-Speed (born Rory Douglas Speed; 7 April 1992) is a Scottish actor. He studied at Edinburgh Napier University, and is best known for playing Joel Dexter in the Channel 4 soap opera Hollyoaks from 2016 to 2025.

== Career ==
After university, Douglas-Speed was cast in the part of Sick Boy in a stage production of Irvine Welsh's novel (and, later, film) Trainspotting at the King's Head Theatre, in London.

Between 2016 and 2025, he played Joel Dexter on Hollyoaks, taking over the role from Andrew Still.

== Personal life ==
Douglas-Speed is in a relationship with Hollyoaks co-star Nadine Mulkerrin. The couple announced their engagement in December 2018 and in June 2019, they announced that they are expecting their first child. Their son was born on 15 October 2019. On 25 December 2021, Mulkerrin and Douglas-Speed announced that they were expecting their second child, and their second son was born on 24 May 2022.

Douglas-Speed has type 1 diabetes.
