= Los Angeles County Museum of Art =

Art museum in California, United States

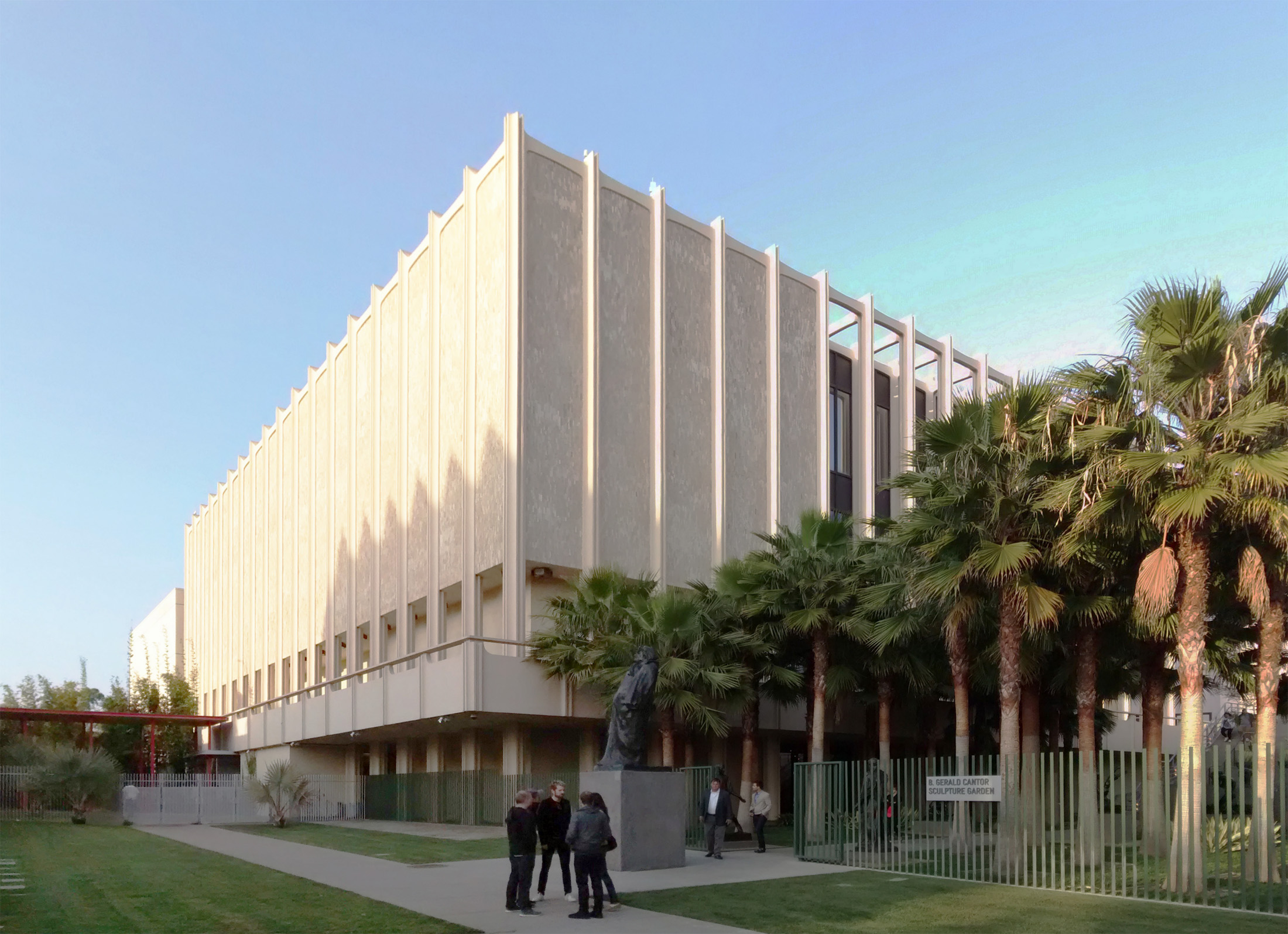
- Museum pavilion, 2014, prior to demolition
- Interactive fullscreen map
- Established: 1910
- Location: 5905 Wilshire Boulevard; Los Angeles; United States
- Coordinates: 34°03′48″N 118°21′33″W
- Type: Encyclopedic, Art museum
- Visitors: 1,592,101 (2016)
- Director: Michael Govan
- Architects: William Pereira (1965); Hardy Holzman Pfeiffer Associates (1986); Bruce Goff (1988)
- Public transit access: Bus: 20, 217, 720 or 780 to Wilshire Bl and Fairfax Av; Rail: Wilshire/Fairfax
- Website: www.lacma.org

The Los Angeles County Museum of Art (LACMA) is an art museum located on Wilshire Boulevard in the Miracle Mile vicinity of Los Angeles. LACMA is on Museum Row, adjacent to the La Brea Tar Pits (George C. Page Museum).

LACMA was founded in 1961, splitting from the Los Angeles Museum of History, Science and Art. Four years later, it moved to the Wilshire Boulevard complex designed by William Pereira. The museum's wealth and collections grew in the 1980s, and it added several buildings beginning in that decade and continuing in subsequent decades.

LACMA is the largest art museum in the western United States. It attracts nearly a million visitors annually. It holds more than 150,000 works spanning the history of art from ancient times to the present. In addition to art exhibits, the museum features film and concert series.

== History ==
=== Early years ===
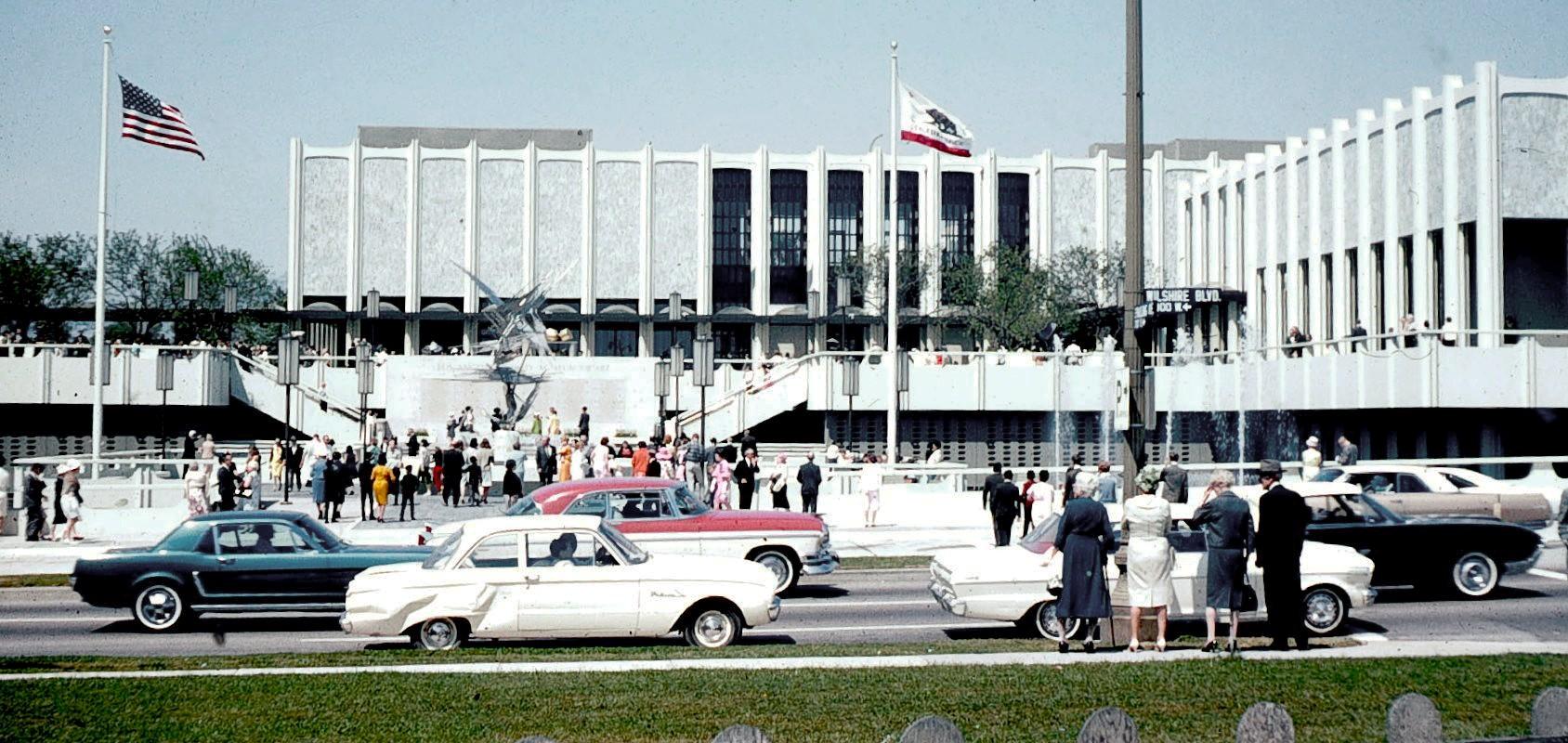
Wilshire Boulevard and the Art Museum in 1965

The Los Angeles County Museum of Art was established as a museum in 1961. Prior to this, LACMA was part of the Los Angeles Museum of History, Science and Art, founded in 1913 in Exposition Park near the University of Southern California.

Edward W. Carter helped orchestrate the fundraising effort for LACMA in response to J. Paul Getty's increasing reluctance to donate any more artworks to Los Angeles County. Getty had donated a few excellent artworks such as the Ardabil Carpet and Rembrandt's Portrait of Martin Looten, but then became aware of their shabby and disorganized presentation in the county's aging multipurpose museum and chose to establish his own art museum next to his house.

The land where the first LACMA buildings were built was owned by Los Angeles County, having received the land as a gift in 1916 from G. Allan Hancock. In 1960, part of the Hancock gift was turned over for the LACMA campus.

Howard F. Ahmanson, Sr., Anna Bing Arnold and Bart Lytton were the first principal patrons of the new county art museum. Ahmanson made the lead donation of $2 million, convincing the museum board that sufficient funds could be raised to establish the new museum. In 1965 the museum moved to a new Wilshire Boulevard complex as an independent, art-focused institution, the largest new museum to be built in the United States after the National Gallery of Art.

=== William Pereira Buildings ===
The museum, built in a style similar to Lincoln Center and the Los Angeles Music Center, consisted of three buildings: the Ahmanson Building, the Bing Center, and the Lytton Gallery (renamed the Frances and Armand Hammer Building in 1968). The board selected LA architect William Pereira over the directors' recommendation of Ludwig Mies van der Rohe for the buildings. According to a 1965 Los Angeles Times story, the total cost of the three buildings was $11.5 million. Construction began in 1963, and was undertaken by the Del E. Webb Corporation. Construction was completed in early 1965. At the time, the Los Angeles Music Center and LACMA were concurrent large civic projects which vied for attention and donors in Los Angeles. When the museum opened, the buildings were surrounded by reflecting pools, but they were filled in and covered over when tar from the adjacent La Brea Tar Pits began seeping in.

=== 1980s Expansion ===
Former LACMA parking garage mural by Barry McGee

Former LACMA parking garage mural by Margaret Kilgallen (2000)

Money poured into LACMA during the boom years of the 1980s, a reportedly $209 million in private donations during director Earl Powell's tenure. To house its growing collections of modern and contemporary art and to provide more space for exhibitions, the museum hired the architectural firm of Hardy Holzman Pfeiffer Associates to design its $35.3-million, 115,000-square-foot (10,700 m^{2}) Robert O. Anderson Building for 20th-century art, which opened in 1986 (renamed the Art of the Americas Building in 2007). In the far-reaching expansion, museum-goers henceforth entered through the new partially roofed central court, nearly 1-acre (0.40 ha) of space bounded by the museum's four buildings.

The museum's Pavilion for Japanese Art, designed by maverick architect Bruce Goff, opened in 1988, as did the B. Gerald Cantor Sculpture Garden of Rodin bronzes.

In 1999, the Hancock Park Improvement Project was complete, and the LACMA-adjacent park (designed by landscape architect Laurie Olin) was inaugurated with a free public celebration. The $10-million renovation replaced dead trees and bare earth with picnic facilities, walkways, viewing sites for the La Brea tar pits and a 150-seat red granite amphitheater designed by artist Jackie Ferrara.

Also in 1994, LACMA purchased the adjacent former May Company department store building, an impressive example of streamline moderne architecture designed by Albert C. Martin Sr. LACMA West increased the museum's size by 30 percent when the building opened in 1998.

=== Renzo Piano Buildings ===
In 2004, LACMA's board of trustees unanimously approved a plan for LACMA's transformation by architect Rem Koolhaas, who had proposed razing all the current buildings and constructing an entirely new single, tent-topped structure, estimated to cost $200 million to $300 million. Kohlhaas edged out French architect Jean Nouvel, who would have added a major building while renovating the older facilities. The list of candidates had previously narrowed to five in May 2001: Koolhaas, Nouvel, Steven Holl, Daniel Libeskind and Thom Mayne.

However, the project soon stalled after the museum failed to secure funding. In 2004 LACMA's board of trustees unanimously approved plans to transform the museum, led by architect Renzo Piano. The planned transformation consisted of three phases.

Phase I started in 2004 and was completed in February 2008. The renovations required demolishing the parking structure on Ogden Avenue and with it LACMA-commissioned graffiti art by street artists Margaret Kilgallen and Barry McGee. The entry pavilion is a key point in architect Renzo Piano's plan to unify LACMA's sprawling, often confusing layout of buildings. The BP Grand Entrance and the adjacent Broad Contemporary Art Museum (BCAM) constitute the $191 million (originally $150 million) first phase of the three-part expansion and renovation campaign. BCAM is named for Eli and Edy Broad, who gave $60 million to LACMA's campaign; Eli Broad also served on LACMA's board of directors. BCAM opened on February 16, 2008, adding 58,000 square feet (5,400 m^{2}) of exhibition space to the museum. In 2010 the Lynda and Stewart Resnick Exhibition Pavilion opened to the public, providing the largest purpose-built, naturally lit, open-plan museum space in the world.

The second phase was intended to turn the May building into new offices and galleries, designed by SPF Architects. As proposed, it would have had flexible gallery space, education space, administrative offices, a new restaurant, a gift shop and a bookstore, as well as study centers for the museum's departments of costume and textiles, photography and prints and drawings, and a roof sculpture garden with two works by James Turrell. However, construction of this phase was halted in November 2010. Phases two and three remain uncompleted.

=== Zumthor Building ===
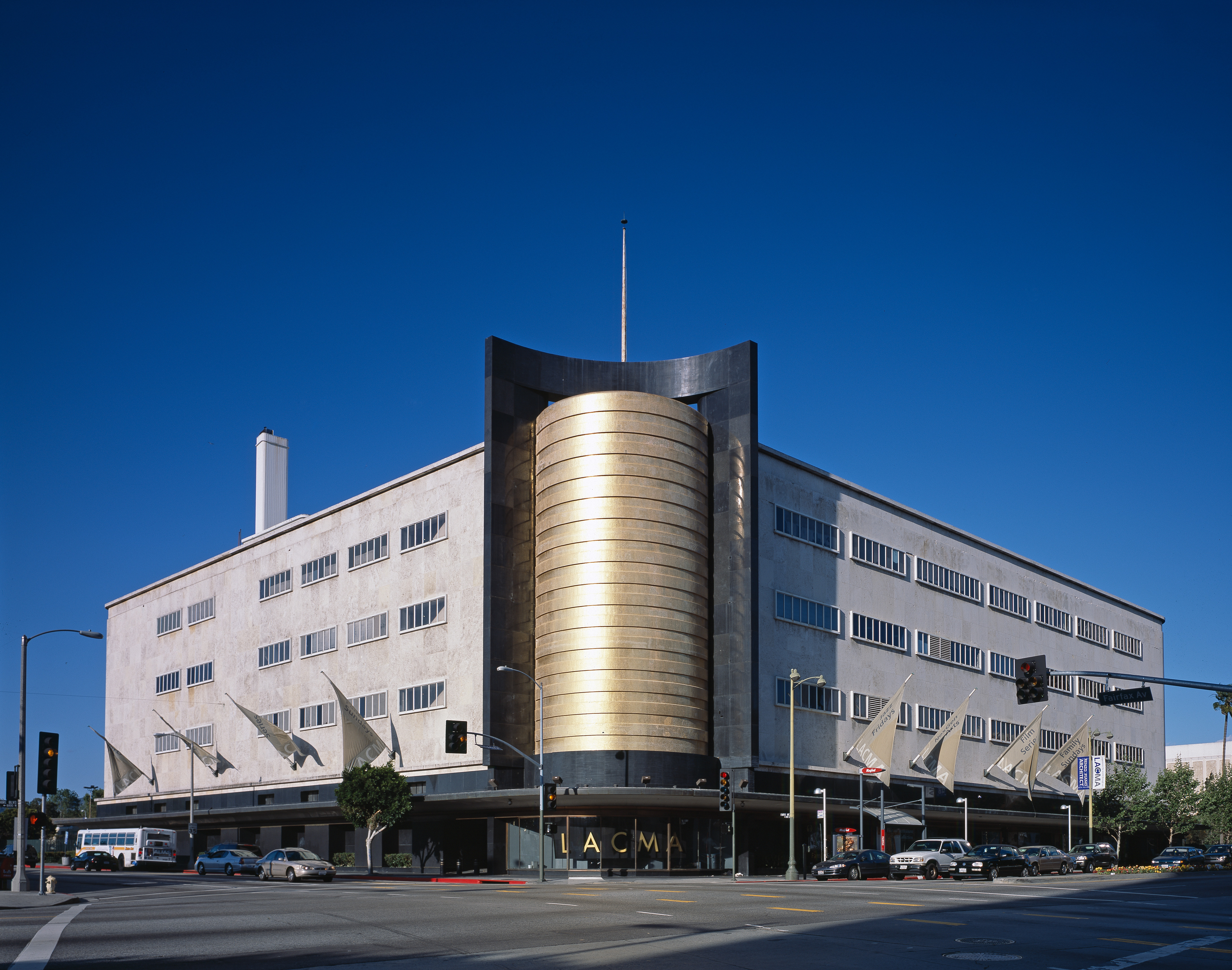
LACMA West, the former May Company building on the corner of Wilshire Boulevard and Fairfax Avenue, which is currently home to The Academy Museum of Motion Pictures

Specifics about the third phase, which initially was to involve renovations to older buildings, long remained undisclosed. In November 2009, plans were made public that LACMA's director Michael Govan was working with Swiss architect and Pritzker Prize laureate Peter Zumthor on plans for rebuilding the eastern section of the campus, the Perreira Buildings between the two new Renzo Piano buildings and the tar pits. Architecture firm Skidmore, Owings & Merrill collaborated with Zumthor on the building's design. With an estimated cost of $650 million, Zumthor's first proposal called for a horizontal building along Wilshire Boulevard. It would have been wrapped in glass on all sides and its main galleries lifted one floor into the air. The wide roof would have been covered with solar panels. In a later concession to concerns raised by its neighbor, the Page Museum, LACMA had Zumthor alter the shape of his proposed building to stretch across Wilshire Boulevard and away from the La Brea Tar Pits.

In June 2014, the Los Angeles County Board of Supervisors approved $5 million for LACMA to continue its proposed plans to tear down the William Perreira structures and its 1980's additions on the east end of its campus for a single museum building. Later that year, they approved in concept a plan that would provide public financing and $125 million toward the $600-million project.

On April 8, 2019, the Zumthor-designed building was approved by the Los Angeles County Board of Supervisors. The final approved building designed was scaled back from the original 387,500 square feet (36,000 m^{2}) to 347,500 square feet (32,280 m^{2}), with gallery space shrinking from 121,000 square feet (11,200 m^{2}) to 110,000 square feet (10,000 m^{2}). The new proposal also dropped the black form aesthetics, reducing it to a one-level, aboveground, glass-enclosed, sand-colored concrete building, to save costs. The design still calls for an arm above Wilshire Boulevard.

Other than necessary mechanical systems and bathrooms, the building's entire second story will be devoted to gallery space. Arranged in four broad clusters around the building, each one of the twenty-six core galleries is designed in the form of a square or a rectangle at various scales. Other services, among them the museum's education department, shop and three restaurants, will be at ground level, as will a 300-seat theater in the section of the building on the southern side of Wilshire Boulevard.

The total cost was estimated to be at $650 million after financing by Diana Vesga, with LA county providing $125 million in funds and the rest raised by fundraising. LACMA raised $560 million by 2019 and $700 million by 2022. The total estimate is now at $750 million by 2023.

In 2020, four buildings on the campus were demolished to make way for a reconstructed facility, the Ahmanson Building, the Bing Center, Art of the Americas building and the Hammer Building. His design drew strong community opposition and was lambasted by architectural critics and museum curators, who objected to its reduced gallery space, poor design, and exorbitant costs. The re-designed final building was criticized by some local architects, including the Los Angeles Times editorial architect Christopher Knight, calling the plans "half baked". Antonio Pacheco called the plans an "affront to L.A.'s architectural and cultural heritage." Especially criticized was the plan's reduction in gallery space. The plans raised significant controversy from Angelenos as well, prompting a "Save LACMA" campaign.

Los Angeles owns air rights above Wilshire, so the city council had to approve the project, since part of the structure goes over the street. Demolition of the Pereira buildings began in April 2020 and completed in October of that same year. By 2021, construction slowed with the discovery of on-site fossil finds. In the meantime, the Zumthor building opening was pushed back to 2024, and eventually, 2026. In February 2026, LACMA announced the opening dates for the Zumthor buildings, now named David Geffen Galleries. The galleries opened to members on April 19, 2026, and to the general public on May 4, 2026. Up to 3,000 of LACMA's collection of objects are displayed at the Geffen Galleries. In November 2026, ArtNews gave a special citation to the inaugural installation of works of the Geffen Galleries to LAMCA, saying "The curators’ work provides new insights into well-known works, spotlights lesser-known ones, and offers elegant juxtapositions."

== Partnerships ==
=== Watts Towers ===
In 2010 LACMA partnered with the City of Los Angeles Cultural Affairs Department in an effort to ensure the preservation of the Watts Towers, offering its staff, expertise, and fundraising assistance. As of 2018, LACMA is working with Los Angeles County to develop a site at the Earvin "Magic" Johnson Park, which is close to Watts Towers.

=== South Los Angeles Wetlands Park site ===
In 2018, LACMA secured a 35-year lease on an 80,000-square-foot (7,400 m^{2}), city-owned former Metro maintenance and storage yard from 1911 in the South Los Angeles Wetlands Park area.

=== Las Vegas Museum of Art ===
In 2023, LACMA and the foundation of the philanthropist Elaine Wynn announced their partnership to launch the Las Vegas Museum of Art (LVMA). That same year, the Las Vegas council approved negotiations to dedicate a parcel of land for the proposed 90,000-square-foot (8,400 m^{2}), three-story building of the Las Vegas Museum of Art in Symphony Park.

=== Local Access ===
With the support of a 2021 grant provided by Art Bridges and the Terra Foundation for American Art, LACMA launched a collaboration called Local Access, in which the museum shares portions of its collection with the Lancaster Museum of Art and History, Riverside Art Museum, Vincent Price Art Museum at East Los Angeles College, and California State University, Northridge, Art Galleries.

== Exhibitions ==
In 1971, curator Maurice Tuchman's revolutionary "Art and Technology" exhibit opened at LACMA after its debut at the 1970 World Exposition in Osaka, Japan. The museum staged its first exhibition by contemporary black artists later that year, featuring Charles Wilbert White, Timothy Washington and David Hammons, then little known. The museum's best-attended show ever was "Treasures of Tutankhamun", which drew 1.2 million during four months in 1978. The 2005 "Tutankhamun and the Golden Age of the Pharaohs" drew 937,613 during its 137-day run. A 1999 show of Vincent van Gogh masterpieces from the artist's eponymous Amsterdam museum is the third most successful show, and a 1984 exhibition of French Impressionist works is fourth. In 1994, "Picasso and the Weeping Women: The Years of Marie-Therese Walter and Dora Maar" opened to rave reviews and large crowds, drawing more than 153,000 visitors.

Since the arrival of current director Michael Govan, about 80% of just over 100 featured temporary exhibitions have been of Modern or contemporary art while the permanent exhibitions feature work dating from antiquity, including pre-Columbian, Assyrian and Egyptian art through contemporary art.

More recent exhibits, focusing on popular culture and entertainment, have also been well-received, both by critics and patrons. Exhibits devoted to the works of movie-directors Tim Burton and Stanley Kubrick drew especially positive reactions and responses.

== Collections ==
LACMA's more than 120,000 objects are divided among its numerous departments by region, media, and time period and are spread amongst the various museum buildings.

=== Modern and Contemporary Art ===
The Modern Art collection was displayed in the Ahmanson Building, which was renovated in 2008 to have a new entrance featuring a large staircase, conceived as a gathering place similar to Rome's Spanish Steps. Filling the atrium at the base of the staircase is Tony Smith's massive sculpture Smoke (1967). The plaza level galleries also house African art and a gallery highlighting the Robert Gore Rifkind Center for German Expressionist Studies.

The modern collection on the plaza level displays works from 1900 to the 1970s, largely populated by the Janice and Henri Lazarof Collection. In December 2007, Janice and Henri Lazarof gave LACMA 130 mostly modernist works estimated to be worth more than $100 million. The collection includes 20 works by Picasso, watercolors and paintings by Paul Klee and Wassily Kandinsky and a considerable number of sculptures by Alberto Giacometti, Constantin Brâncuși, Henry Moore, Willem de Kooning, Joan Miró, Louise Nevelson, Archipenko, and Arp. In 2025, art dealer Otto Kallir's family gifted more than 130 Austrian Expressionist works to LACMA; the donation, with a value well in excess of $60 million, added the first paintings by Gustav Klimt, Egon Schiele, and Richard Gerstl to the museum's collection.

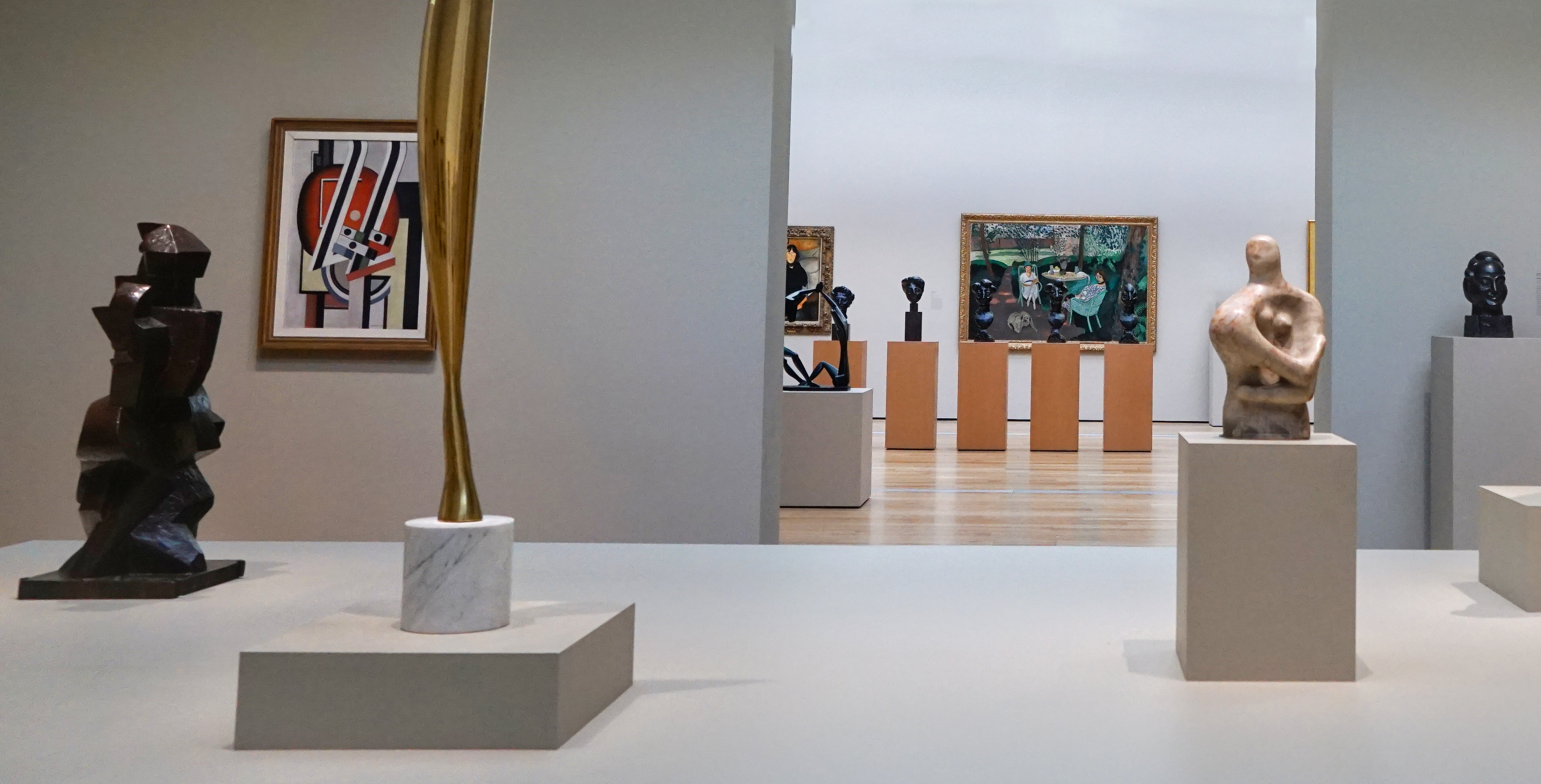
Modern Art galleries

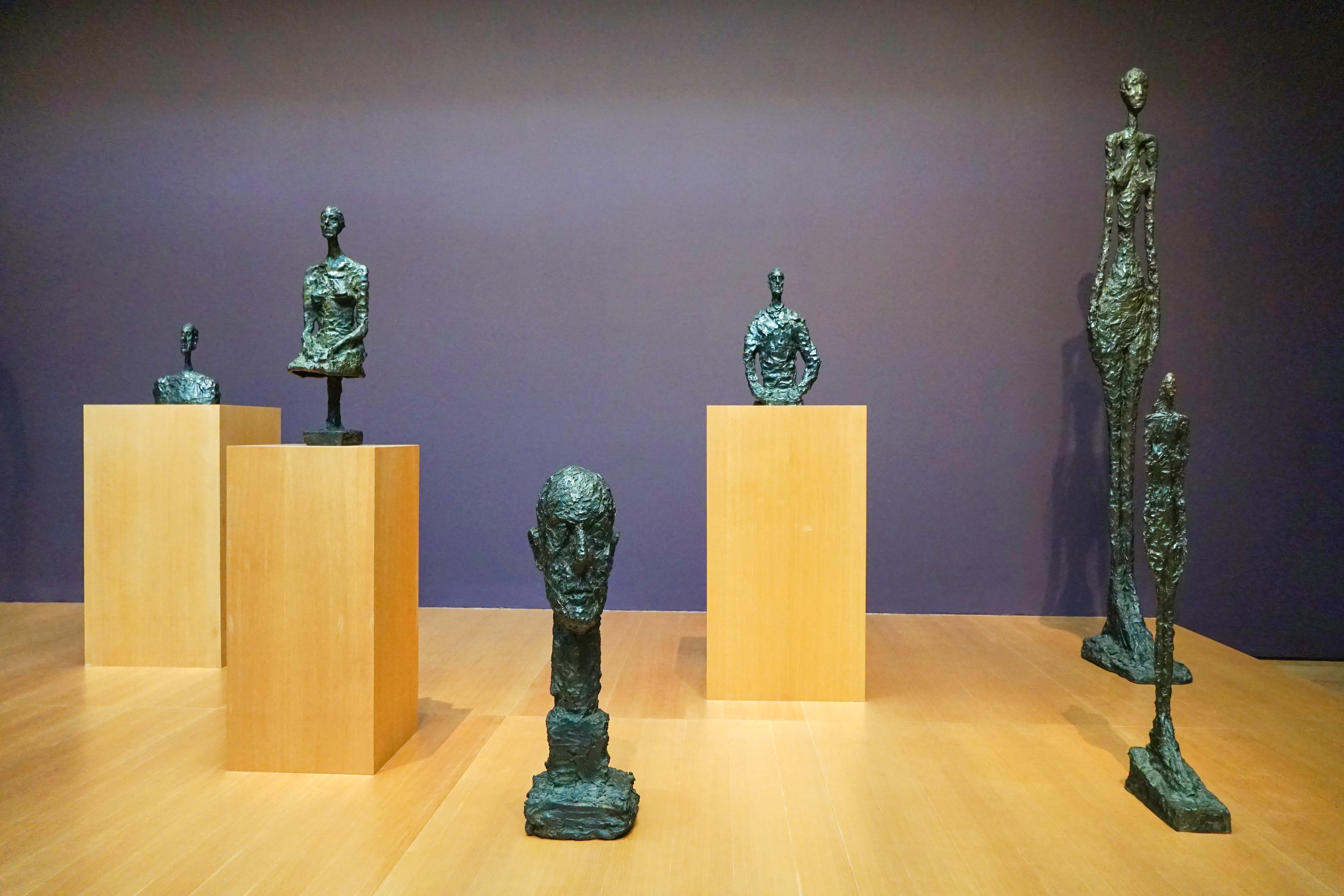
Gallery of works by Alberto Giacometti

The Contemporary Art collection is now displayed in the 60,000-square-foot (5,600 m^{2}) Broad Contemporary Art Museum (BCAM) on the LACMA campus, opened on February 16, 2008. BCAM's inaugural exhibition featured 176 works by 28 artists of postwar Modern art from the late 1950s to the present. All but 30 of the works initially displayed came from the collection of Eli and Edythe Broad (pronounced "brode"). Long-time trustee Robert Halff had already donated 53 works of contemporary art in 1994. Components of that gift included Joan Miró, Jasper Johns, Sam Francis, Frank Stella, Lari Pittman, Chris Burden, Richard Serra, John Chamberlain, Matthew Barney, and Jeff Koons. It also provided LACMA with its first drawings by Claes Oldenburg and Cy Twombly.

Back Seat Dodge '38 (1964), by Edward Kienholz, is a sculpture portraying a couple engaged in sexual activity in the back seat of a truncated 1938 Dodge automobile chassis. The piece won Kienholz instant celebrity in 1966 when the Los Angeles County Board of Supervisors tried to ban the sculpture as pornographic and threatened to withhold financing from LACMA if it included the work in a Kienholz retrospective. A compromise was reached under which the sculpture's car door would remain closed and guarded, to be opened only on the request of a museum patron who was over 18, and only if no children were present in the gallery. The uproar led to more than 200 people lining up to see the work the day the show opened. Ever since, Back Seat Dodge '38 has drawn crowds.

The Modern art collection will now be displayed in the Geffen Galleries.

=== American and Latin American art ===
The Art of the Americas Building had American, Latin American, and pre-Columbian collections displayed on the second floor and temporary exhibition space on the first floor. Formerly known as the Anderson Building, the Art of the Americas Building comprised galleries for art from North, Central, and South America.

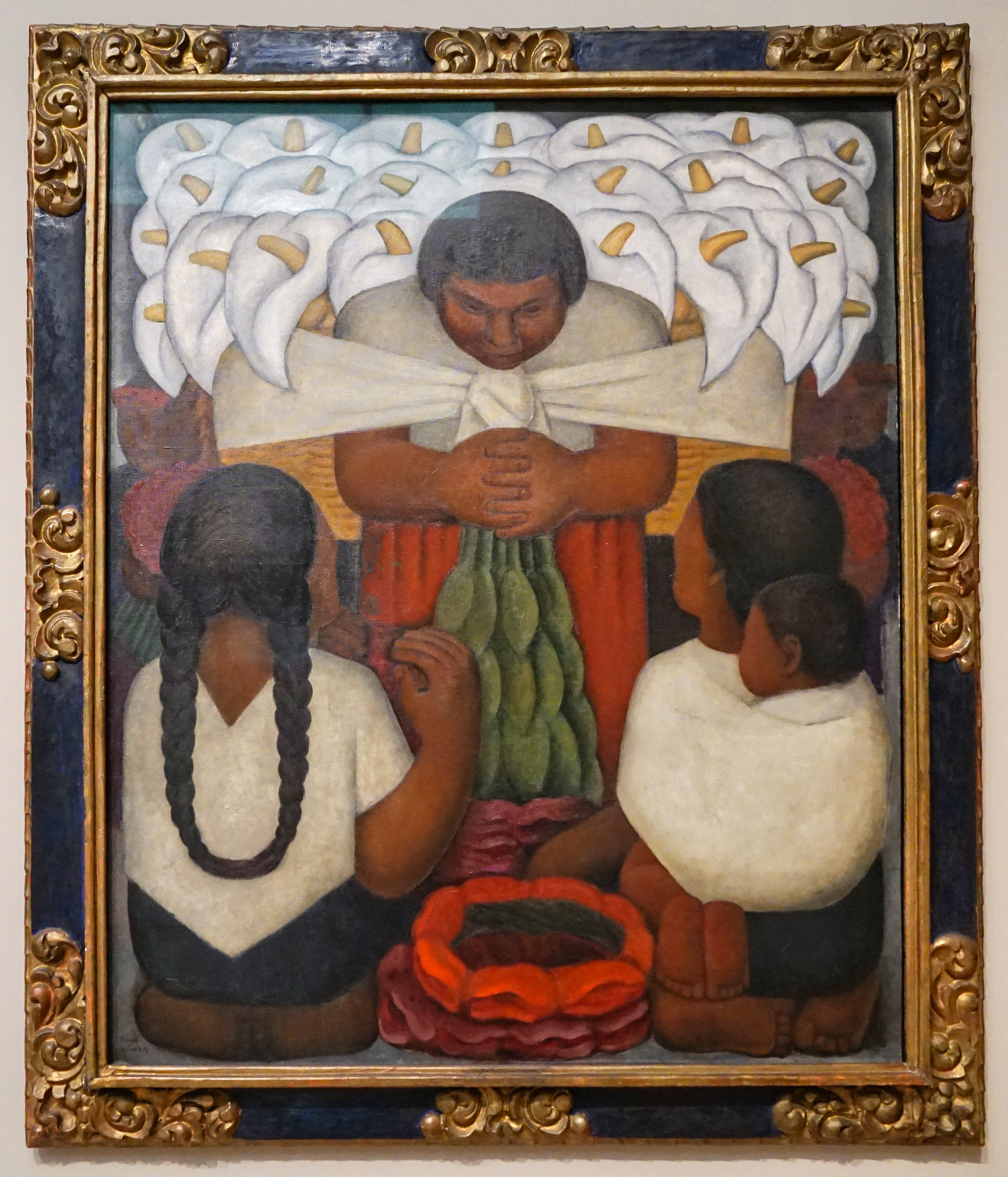
Diego Rivera, Flower Day (Día de Flores), 1925

From 1972 to 1976, Donelson Hoopes served as Senior Curator of American Art.

LACMA's Latin American Art galleries reopened in July 2008 after several years renovation. The Latin American collection includes pre-Columbian, Spanish Colonial, Modern, and contemporary works. Many recent additions to the collection were financed by sales of works from an 1,800 piece holding of 20th century Mexican art compiled by dealer-collectors Bernard and Edith Lewin and given to the museum in 1997. The Latin American Art collection includes "Our Lady of Guadalupe" from 1691 and has been digitized because not all artwork can be on permanent display.

The Art of the Americas building was demolished in 2020, the exhibits were moved and will be on display at the Geffen Galleries.

The pre-Columbian galleries were redesigned by Jorge Pardo, a Los Angeles artist who works in sculpture, design, and architecture. Pardo's display cases are built from thick, stacked sheets of medium-density fiberboard (MDF), with spacing of equal thickness in between the 70-plus layers. The laser-cut organic forms undulate and swell out from the walls, sharply contrasting to the rectangular display cases found in most art museums.

The museum's pre-Columbian collection began in the 1980s with the first installment of a 570-piece gift from Southern California collector Constance McCormick Fearing and the purchase of about 200 pieces from L.A. businessman Proctor Stafford. The holdings recently jumped from about 1,800 to 2,500 objects with a gift of Colombian ceramics from Camilla Chandler Frost, a LACMA trustee and the sister of Otis Chandler, former Los Angeles Times publisher, and Stephen and Claudia Muñoz-Kramer of Atlanta, whose family built the collection. A sizable portion of LACMA's pre-Columbian collection was excavated from burial chambers in Colima, Nayarit and other regions around Jalisco in modern-day Mexico. LACMA boasts one of the largest collections of Latin American art due to the generous donation of more than 2,000 works of art by Bernard Lewin and his wife Edith Lewin in 1996. In 2007 the museum signed an agreement with the Fundación Cisneros for a loan of 25 colonial-style works, later extended until 2017.

The Spanish Colonial collection includes work from 17th and 18th century Mexican artists Miguel Cabrera, José de Ibarra, José de Páez, and Nicolás Rodriguez Juárez. The collection has galleries for Diego Rivera and Rufino Tamayo. The Latin American contemporary gallery highlights works Francis Alÿs.

=== Asian art ===
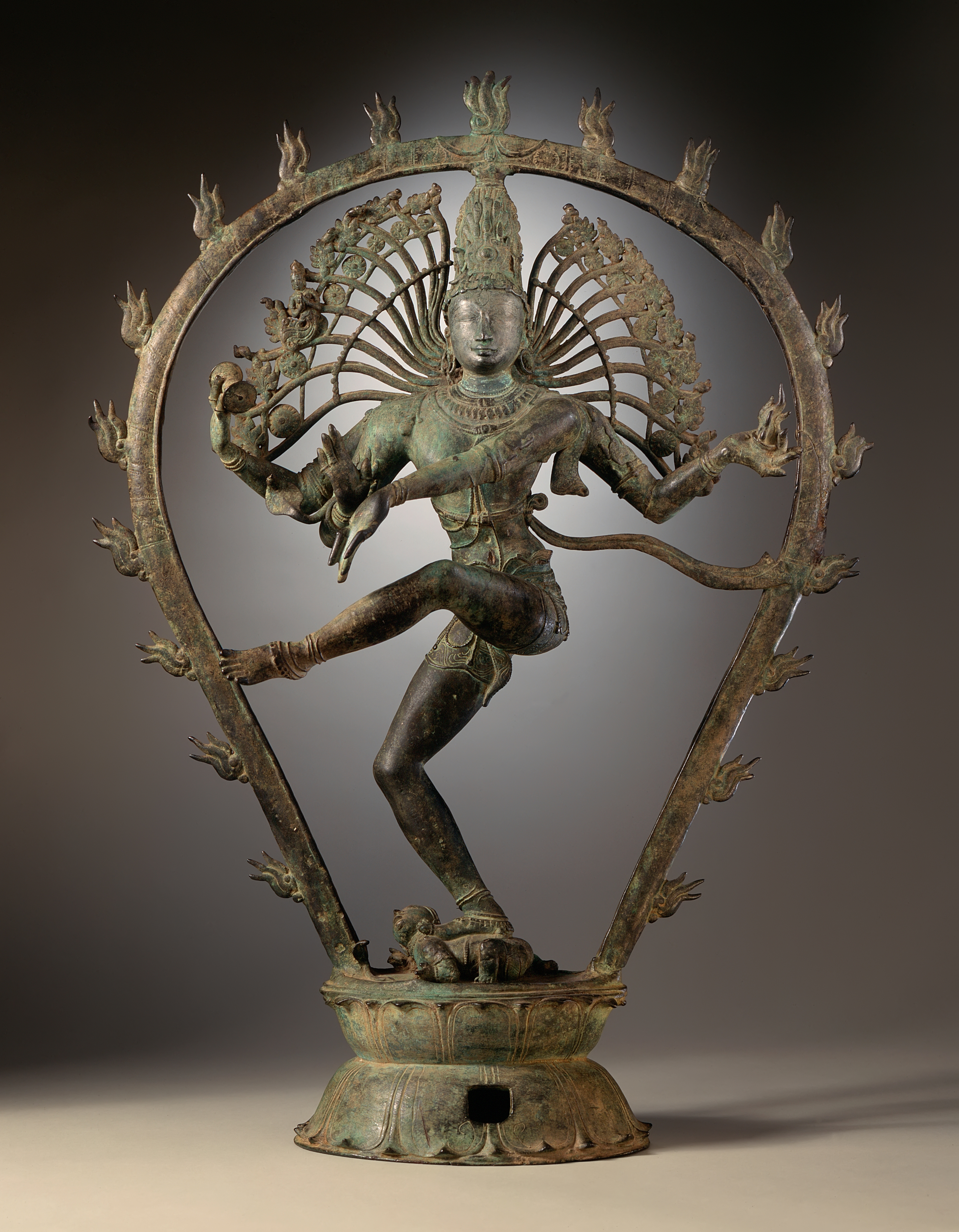
Chola dynasty statue depicting Shiva dancing as Nataraja from LACMA

The Korean art collection began with the donation of a group of Korean ceramics in 1966 by Bak Jeonghui, then president of the Republic of Korea, after a visit to the museum. LACMA today claims to have the most comprehensive holding outside of Korea and Japan. The Pavilion for Japanese Art displays the Shin'enkan collection donated by Joe D. Price. In 1999 LACMA trustee Eric Lidow and his wife, Leza, donated 75 ancient Chinese works valued at a total of $3.5 million, including important bronze objects and prime examples of Buddhist sculpture.

LACMA also has a rich collection of relics from India, mostly consisting of sculptures of Jain Tirthankaras, Buddha and Hindu deities. Many Paintings from India are also present in the LACMA.

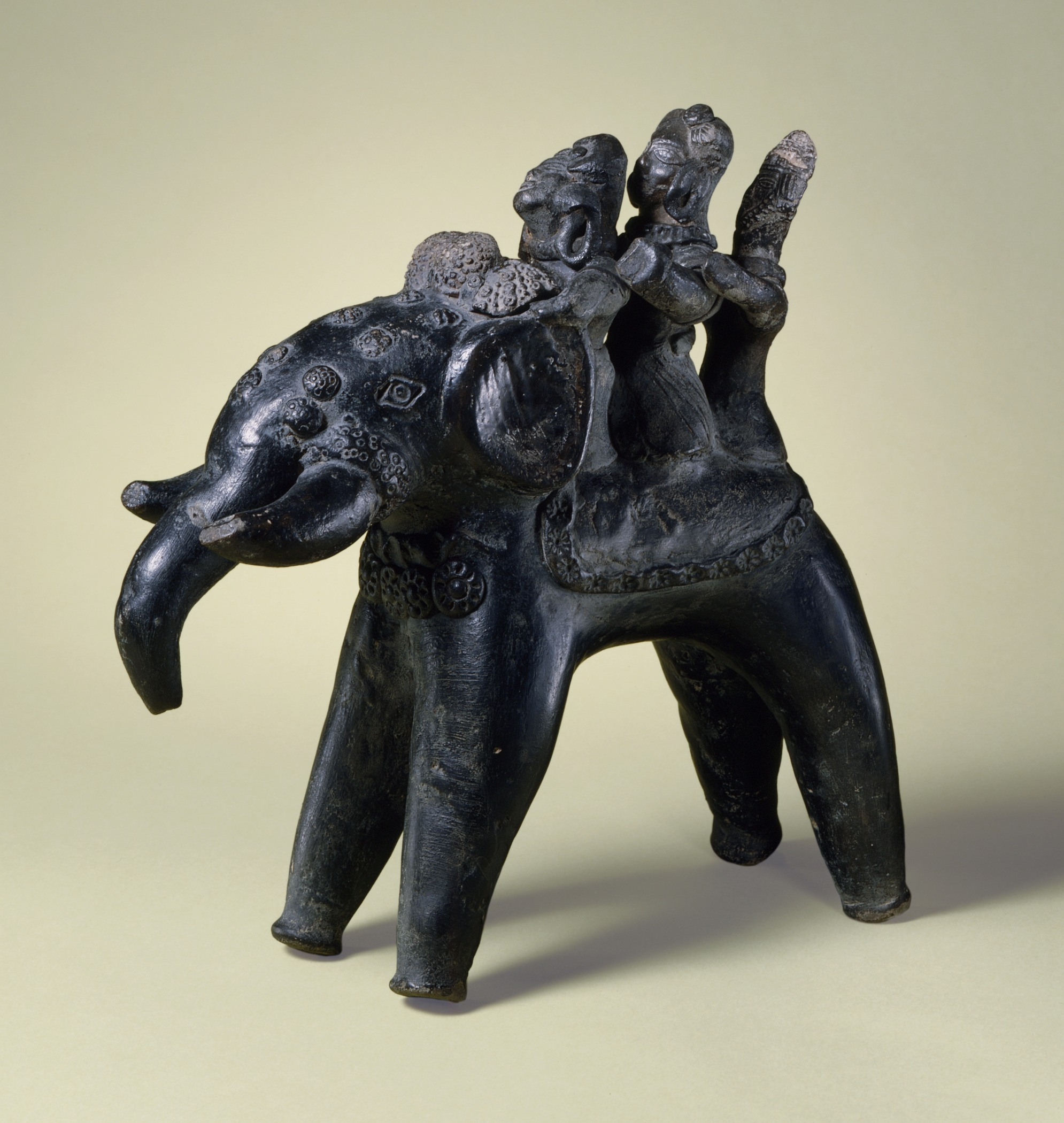
Elephant with Riders, Uttar Pradesh, India, 3rd-2nd century B.C.

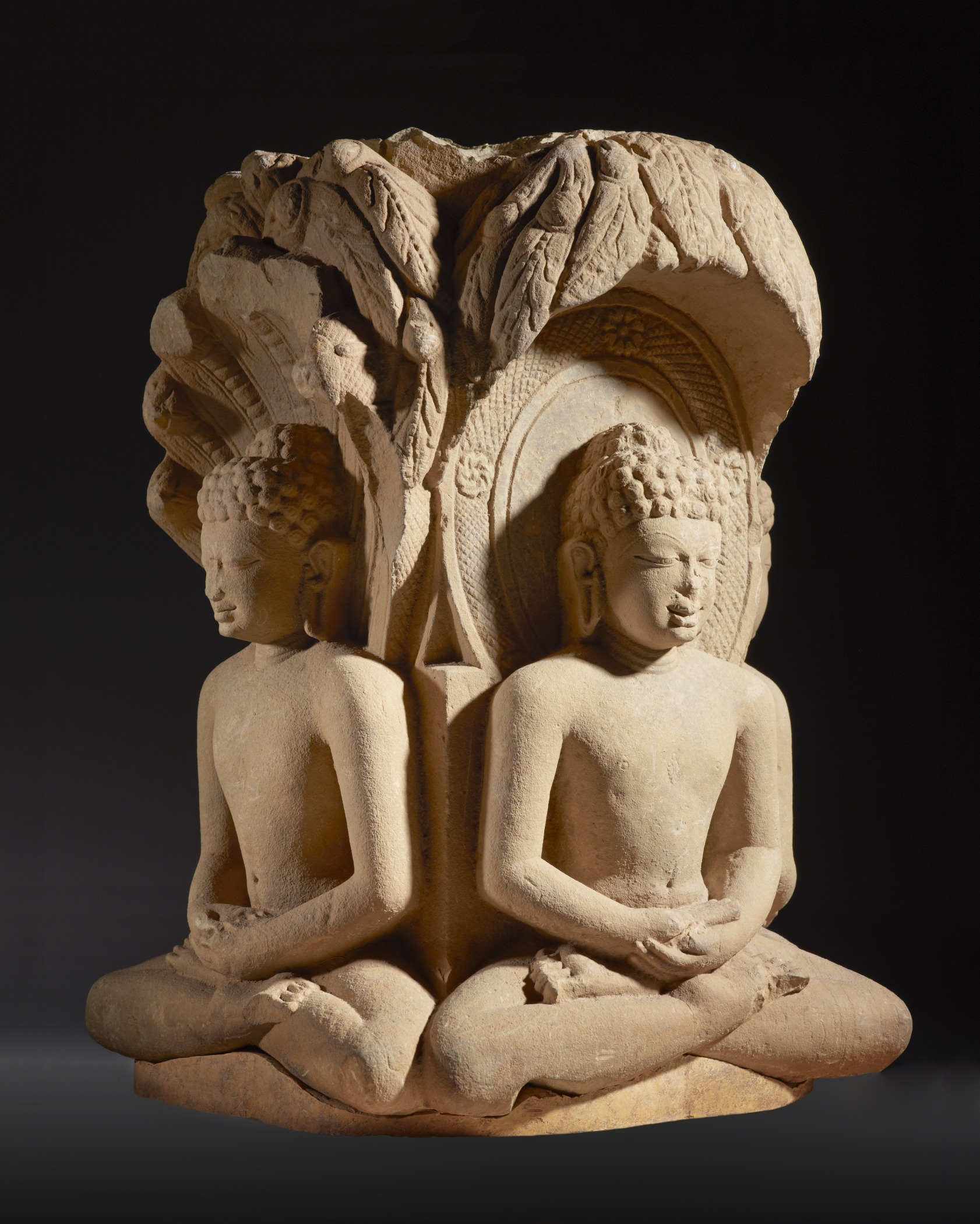
Shrine with Four tirthankaras, 6th century

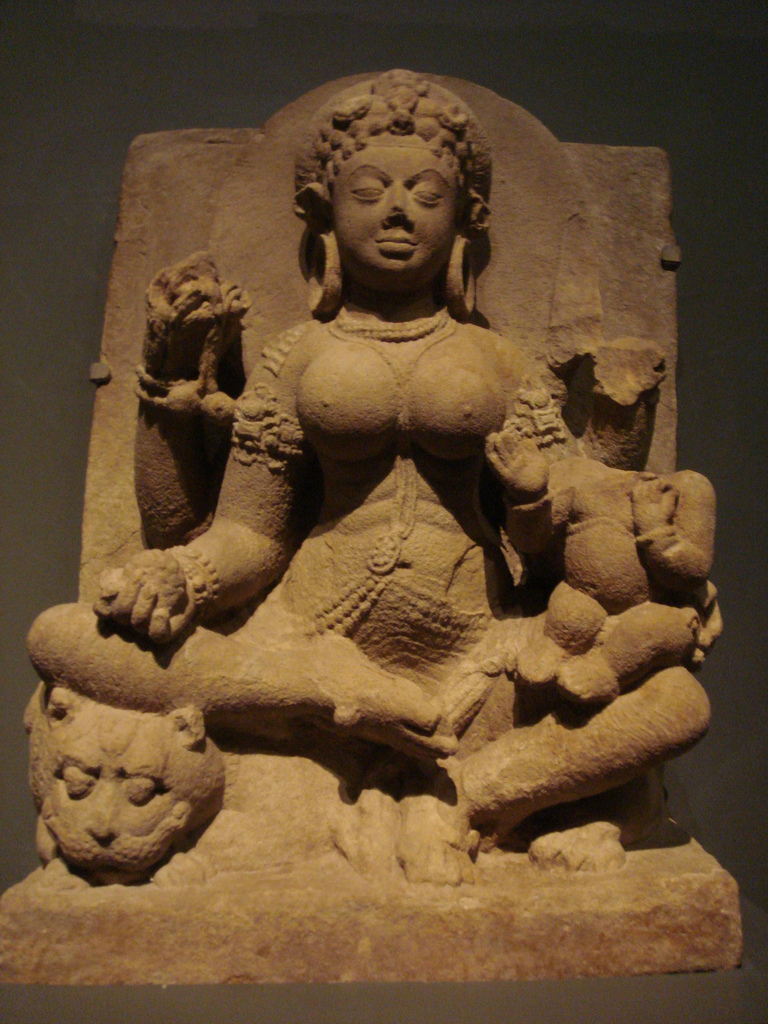
Goddess Ambika in Los Angeles County Museum of Art, 6th-7th century

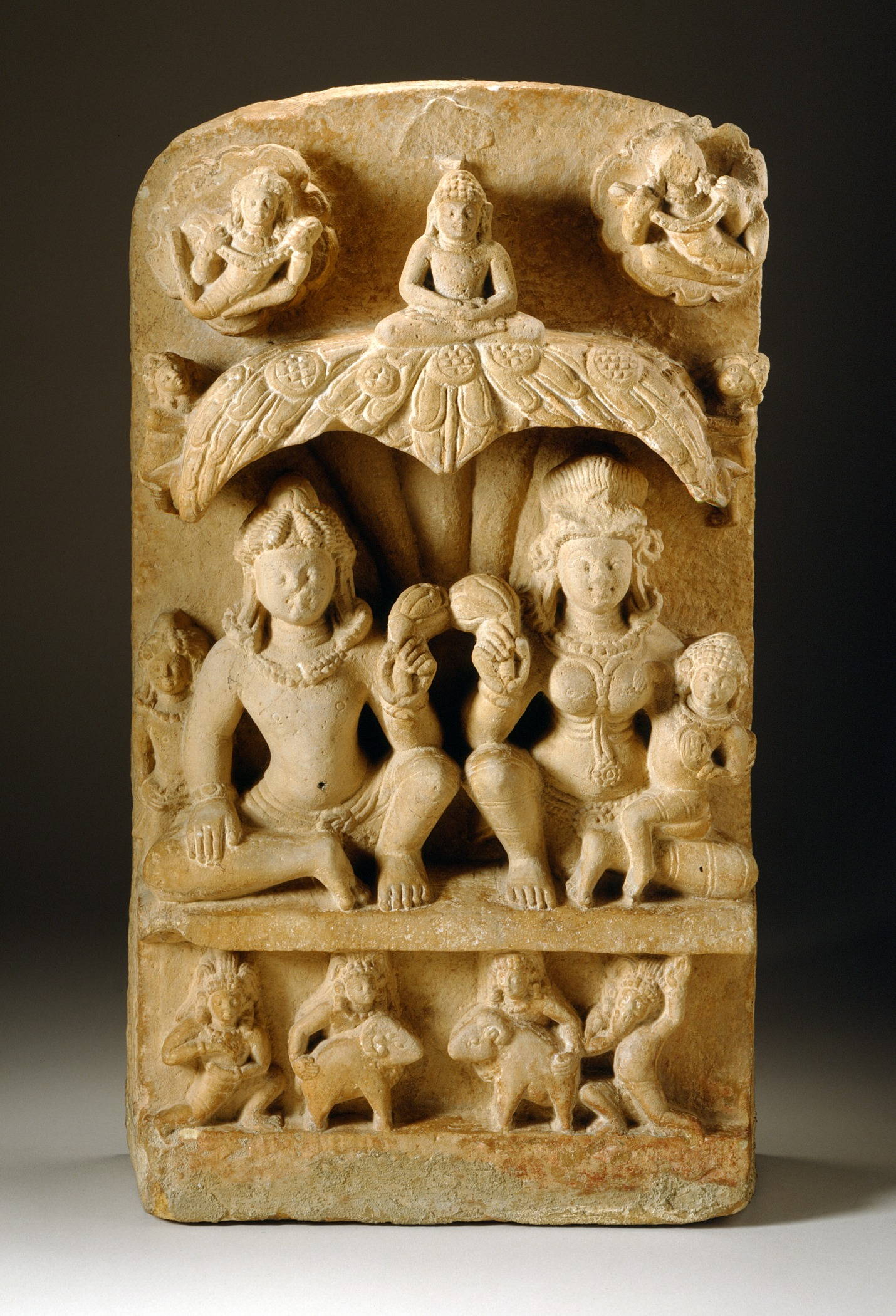
A Jain Family Group, 6th century

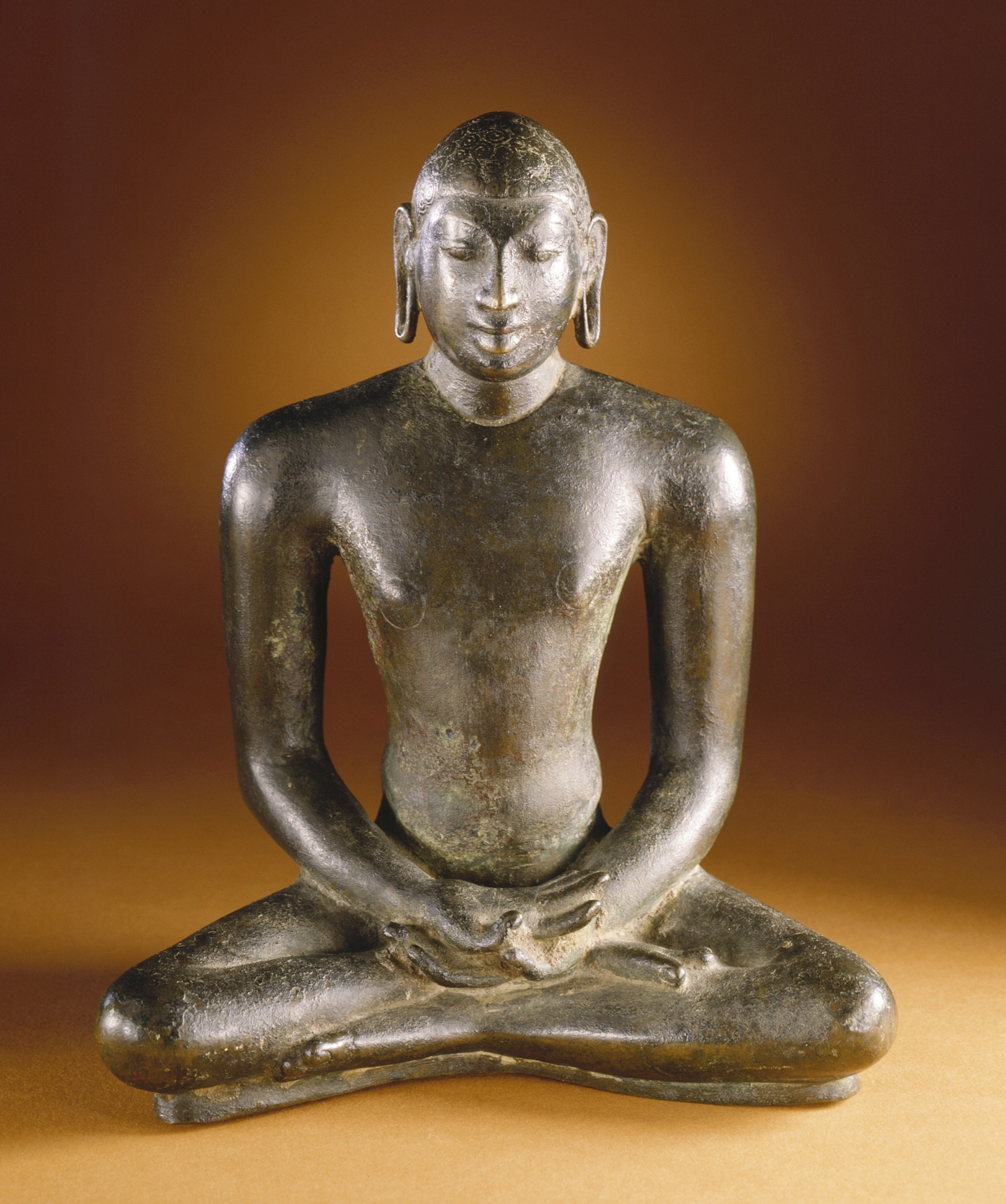
Jina Mahavira, circa 850 CE

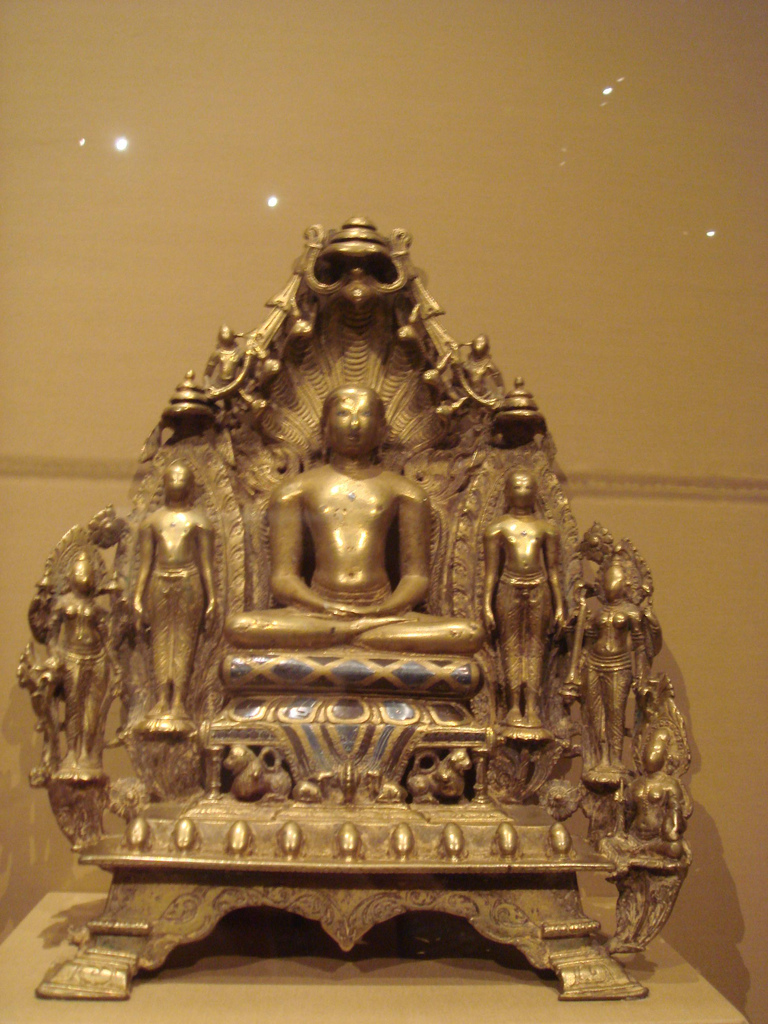
Jain Altarpiece with Parshvanatha, Mahavira and Neminatha, 10th century

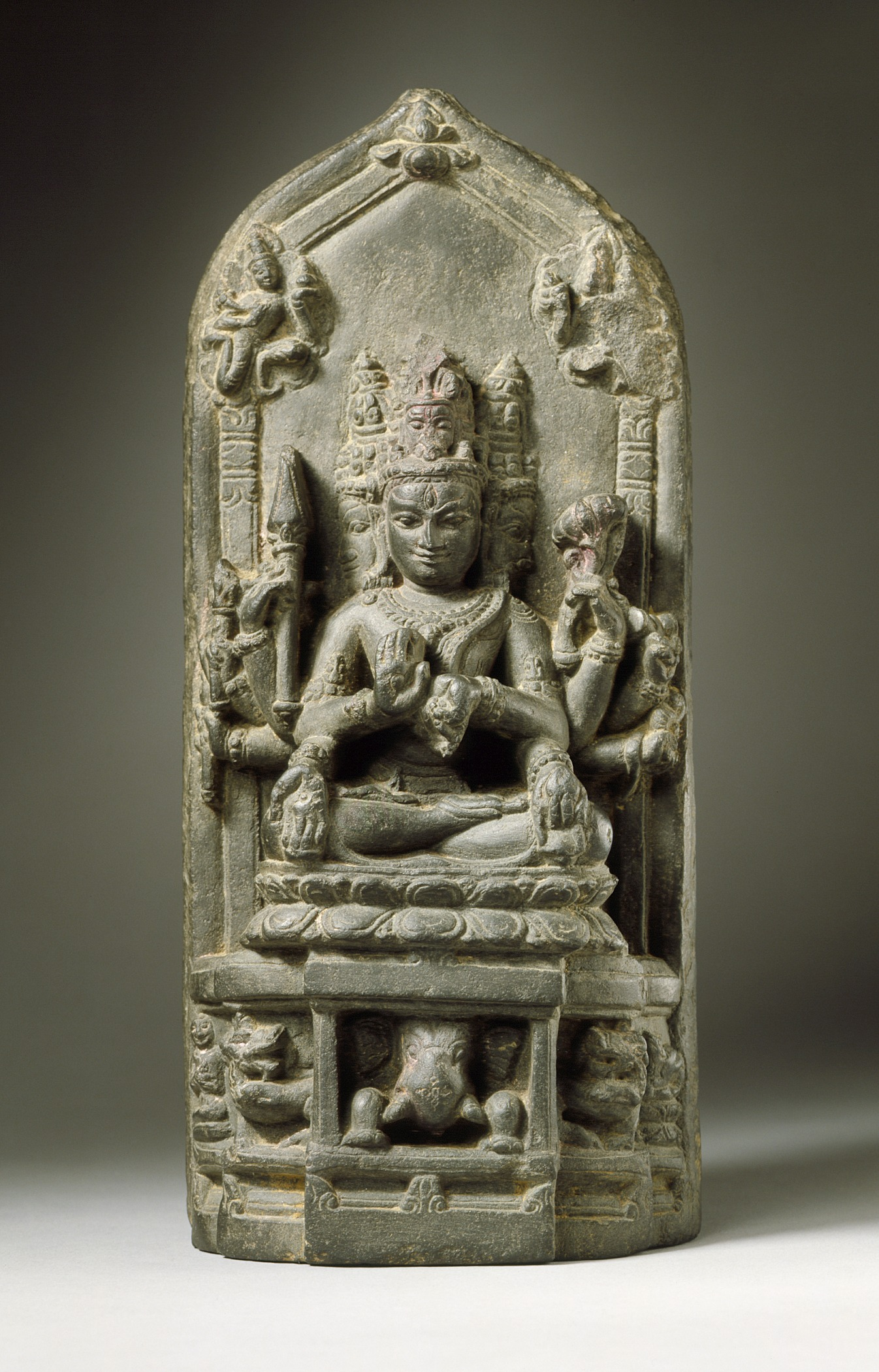
Cosmic Form of the Hindu God Shiva, Nepal, 11th-12th century

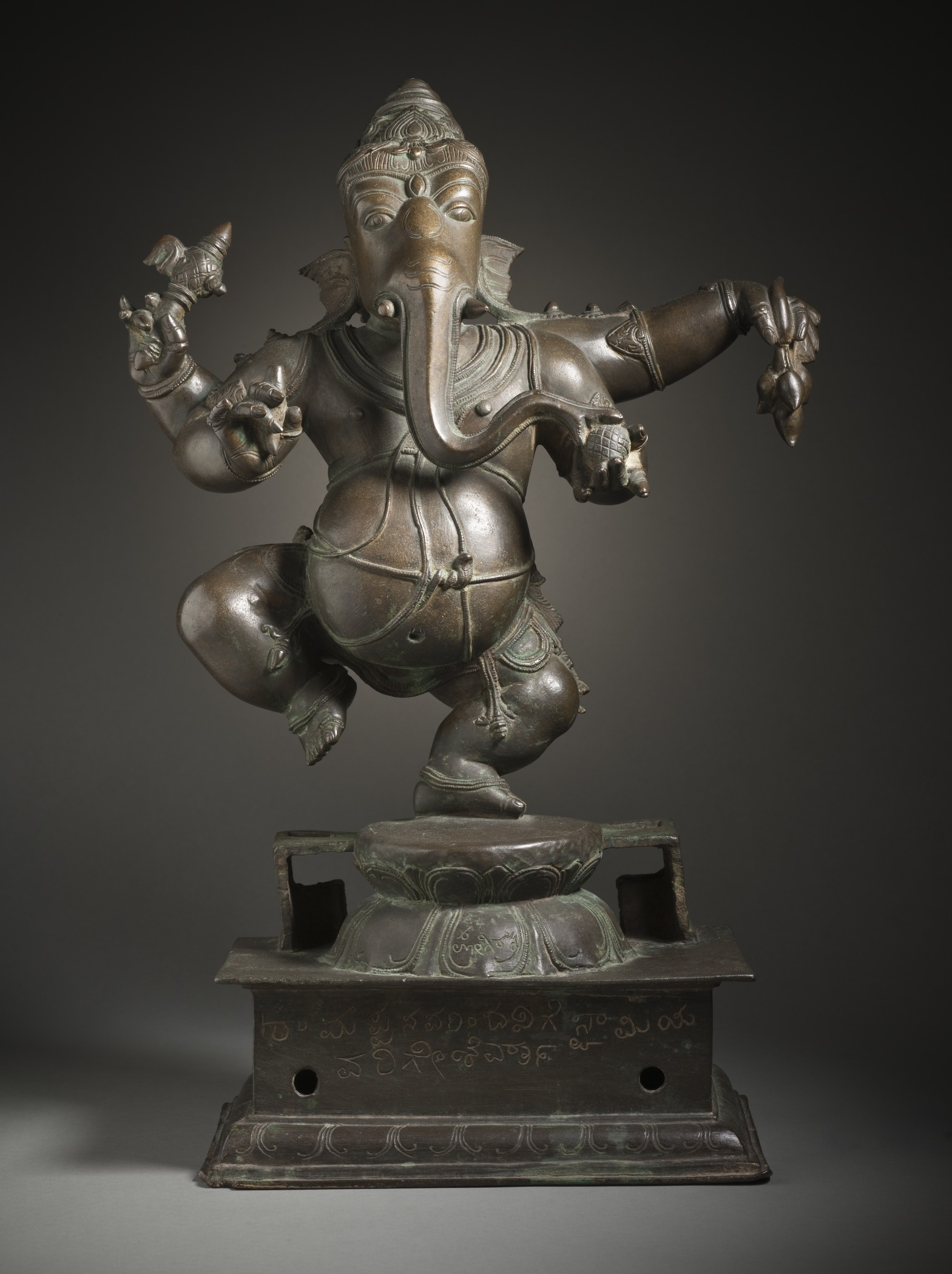
Dancing Ganesha, Lord of Obstacles, Nepal, 16th-17th century

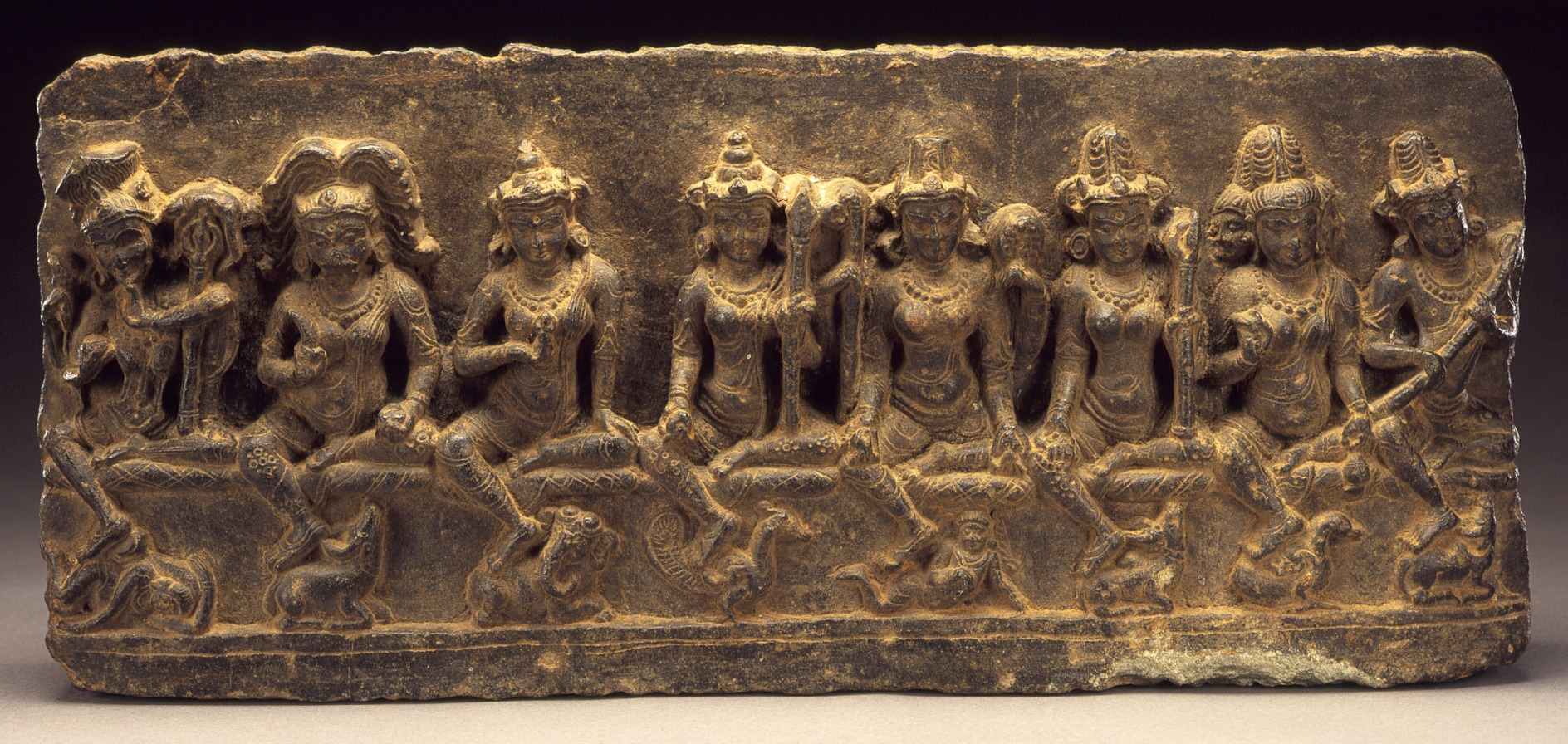
A Relief with Mother Goddesses, Bihar, India, 9th century

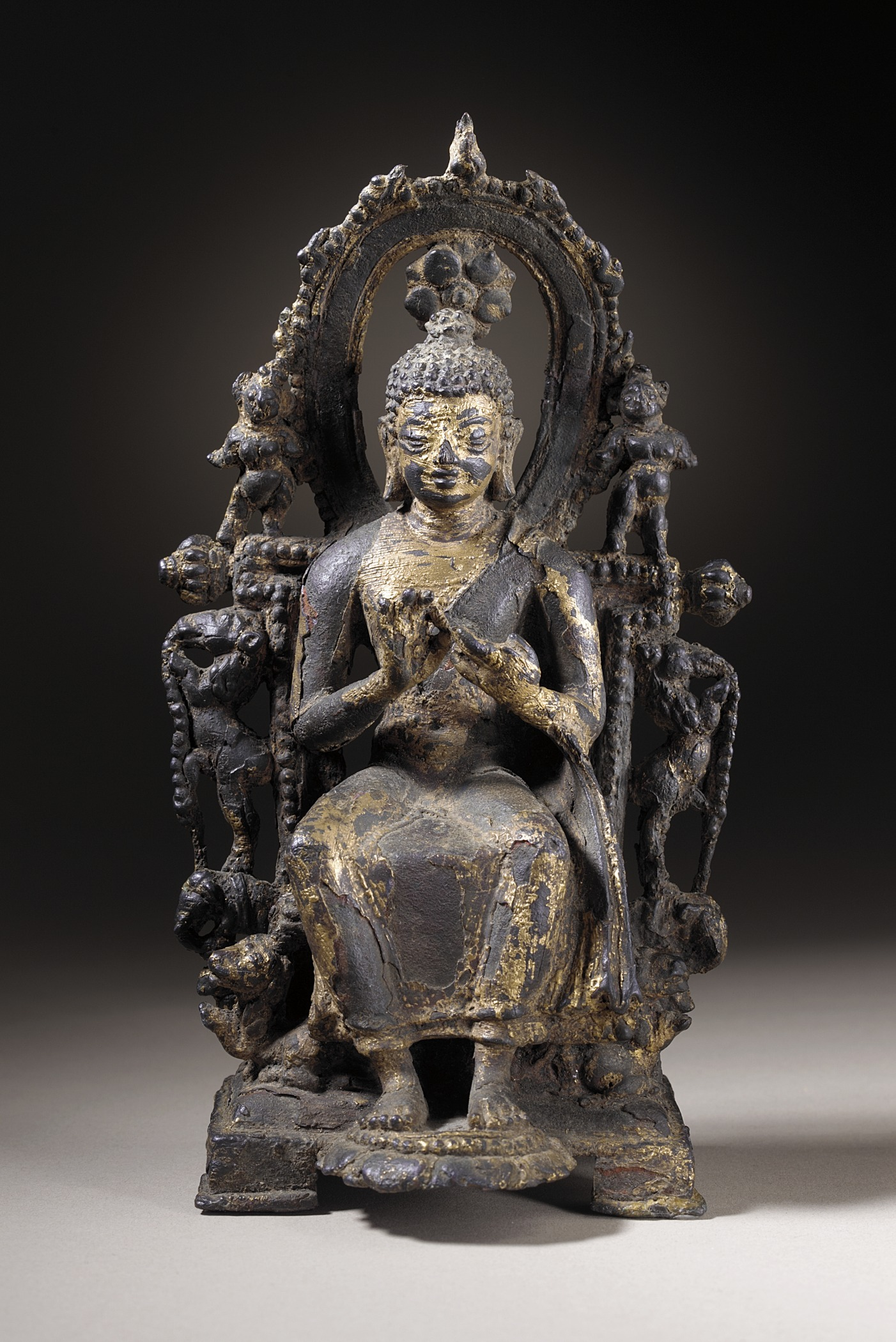
Buddha Shakyamuni or the Bodhisattva Maitreya, Nepal, 8th century

=== Greek, Roman, and Etruscan art ===
A large portion of the museum's ancient Greek and Roman art collection was donated by William Randolph Hearst, the publishing magnate, in the late 1940s and early 1950s.

=== Islamic art ===
The museum's Islamic galleries include over 1700 works from ceramics and inlaid metalwork to enameled glass, carved stone and wood, and arts of the book from manuscript illumination to Islamic calligraphy. The collection is especially strong in Persian and Turkish glazed pottery and tiles, glass, and arts of the book. The collection began in earnest in 1973 when the Nasli M. Heeramaneck Collection was gifted to the museum by philanthropist Joan Palevsky.

=== Decorative arts and design ===
In 1990 Max Palevsky gave 32 pieces of Arts and Crafts furniture to LACMA; three years later, he added an additional 42 pieces to his gift. In 2000, he donated $2 million to LACMA for Arts and Crafts works. He supplied about a third of the 300 objects displayed in a 2004–05 LACMA exhibit, "The Arts and Crafts Movement in Europe and America: 1880–1920" and in 2009, the museum presented "The Arts and Crafts Movement: Masterworks From the Max Palevsky and Jodie Evans Collection". With a single acquisition in 2009, LACMA became a major center for the study and display of 18th- and 19th-century European clothing when it bought the holdings of dealers Martin Kamer of London and Wolfgang Ruf of Beckenried, Switzerland—about 250 outfits and 300 accessories created between 1700 and 1915, including men's three-piece suits, women's dresses, children's garb, and a vast array of shoes, hats, purses, shawls, fans, and undergarments.

=== Permanent art installations ===
Los Angeles sculptor Robert Graham created the towering, bronze Retrospective Column (1981, cast in 1986) for the entrance of the Art of the Americas Building. A new contemporary sculpture garden was opened directly east of the museum's Wilshire Boulevard entrance in 1991, including large-scale outdoor sculptures by Alice Aycock, Ellsworth Kelly, Henry Moore, and others. The centerpiece of the garden is Alexander Calder's three-piece mobile Hello Girls, commissioned by a women's museum-support group for the museum's opening in 1965. Situated in a curving reflecting pool, the mobile has brightly colored paddles that are moved by jets of water.

The Ahmanson Building's atrium was remodeled to hold Tony Smith's Smoke, which had not been displayed since its original 1967 presentation at Washington, D.C.'s Corcoran Gallery of Art. The massive black painted aluminum artwork is made up of 43 piers and is 45 ft (14 m) long, 33 ft (10 m) wide, and 22 ft (6.7 m) high. The newly fabricated work was initially on loan from the artist's estate, but in 2010, after several months of intense fundraising efforts, "the museum acquired the work for an undisclosed amount reported to exceed $3 million and [with an insurance valuation of] 'over $5 million.'" The purchase was "made possible by The Belldegrun Family's gift to LACMA in honor of Rebecka Belldegrun's birthday", per the museum.

Eli and Edythe Broad contributed $10 million to fund the purchase of Richard Serra's Band sculpture, on display on the first floor of BCAM when the building opened.

Urban Light sculpture by Chris Burden

Surrounding the BCAM building and LACMA's courtyard is a 100 palm tree garden, designed by artist Robert Irwin and landscape architect Paul Comstock. Some of the 30 varieties of palms are in the ground, but most are in large wooden boxes above ground. Directly in front of the new entrance to LACMA on Wilshire Boulevard, where Ogden Drive once bisected the 20-acre (8.1 ha) campus between Wilshire Boulevard and 6th Street, is Chris Burden's Urban Light (2008), an orderly, multi-tiered installation of 202 antique cast-iron street lights from various cities in and around the Los Angeles area. The street lights are functional, turn on in the evening, and are powered by solar panels on the roof of the BP Grand Entrance.

Originally Jeff Koons' Tulips (1995–2004) sculpture was inside the Grand Entrance building and Charles Ray's Fire Truck (1993) was outside in the courtyard, both lent by the Broad Art Foundation. Both sculptures were removed after being on display for 3 months due to unexpected damage from patrons and wear.

On February 2, 2007, Michael Govan, with Koons, revealed plans for a 161-foot (49 m)-tall Koons sculpture featuring an operational 1940s locomotive suspended from a crane. The sculpture would be located at the entrance on Wilshire Boulevard, between the Ahmanson Building and the Broad Contemporary Art Museum. By 2011, after "the fundraising climate soured and Koons' California fabricator, Carlson & Co, went out of business after completing a $2.3-million feasibility study" and a $25 million estimated cost, Govan said "We don't have a final method of construction, and I don't have a final fundraising plan." Koons said they are now working with the German fabricator Arnold, outside of Frankfurt, to do an additional engineering study, and Govan says he has committed to spending half a million dollars for that study. The museum has J.B. Turner Engine (1986), a small Koons piece which was shown in the 2006–2007 "Magritte and Contemporary Art: The Treachery of Images" exhibition.

Levitated Mass by artist Michael Heizer is the latest project at LACMA. On December 8, 2011, this 340-ton boulder, 21.5 feet (6.6 m) wide and 21.5 feet (6.6 m) in height, was ready to leave its quarry in Riverside County, after months of postponements. It sits atop the 456-foot (139 m)-long trench which allows people to walk under and around the massive rock. The move started on February 28, 2012, and completed on March 10, 2012. The art piece was opened on June 24, 2012, by Heizer, Los Angeles County Supervisor Zev Yaroslavsky, and Los Angeles City Mayor Antonio Villaraigosa.

=== Photography ===
The Wallis Annenberg Photography Department was launched in 1984 with a grant from the Ralph M. Parsons Foundation. It holds more than fifteen thousand works that span the period from the medium's invention in 1839 to the present. Photography also is integrated into other departments. Although LACMA's photo collection encompasses the entire field, it has many gaps and is far smaller than that of the J. Paul Getty Museum. In 1992, Audrey and Sydney Irmas donated their entire photography collection, creating what is now the Los Angeles County Museum of Art's Audrey and Sydney Irmas Collection of Artists' Self-Portraits, a large and highly specialized selection spanning 150 years. The couple donated the collection two years before a major exhibition of the collection was mounted at LACMA; the display included photos of and by artistic photographers ranging from chemist Alphonse Poitevin in 1853 to Robert Mapplethorpe in 1988. Among other self-portraits in the collection were those of Andy Warhol, Lee Friedlander, and Edward Steichen. Audrey Irmas continues to buy for the collection, but now all the additions are gifts to LACMA. In 2008, LACMA announced that the Annenberg Foundation was making a $23 million gift for the acquisition of the Marjorie and Leonard Vernon collection of 19th- and 20th-century photographs. Among the 3,500 master prints are works by Steichen, Edward Weston, Ansel Adams, Eugène Atget, Imogen Cunningham, Catherine Opie, Cindy Sherman, Barbara Kruger, Ave Pildas and Man Ray. The gift also established an endowment and capital to help build storage facilities for the museum's photographic holdings, which led to the renaming of the photography department as the Wallis Annenberg Department of Photography. In 2011, LACMA and the J. Paul Getty Trust jointly acquired Robert Mapplethorpe's art and archival material, including more than 2,000 works by the artist.

=== Film ===
LACMA's film program was founded by Phil Chamberlin in the late 1960s. In 2009 LACMA announced plans to cancel its 41-year-old film series, citing declining attendance and funding. The decision drew widespread criticism from cinephiles, including film director Martin Scorsese, who wrote an open protest letter that was published in the Los Angeles Times. In response, the museum expanded its movie offerings and partnered with Film Independent to launch a new series. In 2011 LACMA and the Academy of Motion Picture Arts and Sciences announced partnership plans to open a movie museum within three years in the former May Co. building. The Academy Museum opened in 2022.

== Acquisitions and donors ==
=== Individual donors ===
In 2014, LACMA received a $500 million donation of art from businessman Jerry Perenchio. The 47-piece collection contains works by Paul Cézanne, Edgar Degas, René Magritte, Édouard Manet, Claude Monet, and Pablo Picasso. LACMA executive director Michael Govan said it was the biggest gift in the museum's history, and The Washington Post called it "conceivably one of the greatest art gifts ever, to any museum". Perenchio's donation, which becomes effective upon his death, occurs only if the museum completes construction of the new building designed by Peter Zumthor.

The $54 million Resnick Pavillon was made possible by a $45 million gift from the philanthropists for whom it is named. On March 6, 2007, BP announced a $25 million donation to name the entry pavilion under construction as part of LACMA's renovation campaign the "BP Grand Entrance". The $25 million gift matches Walt Disney Co.'s 1997 gift for Disney Hall as the biggest corporate donation to the arts in Southern California. Previously, in 2006, LACMA had announced that the new entrance would be called the "Lynda and Stewart Resnick Grand Entrance Pavilion", in honor of their $25 million gift.

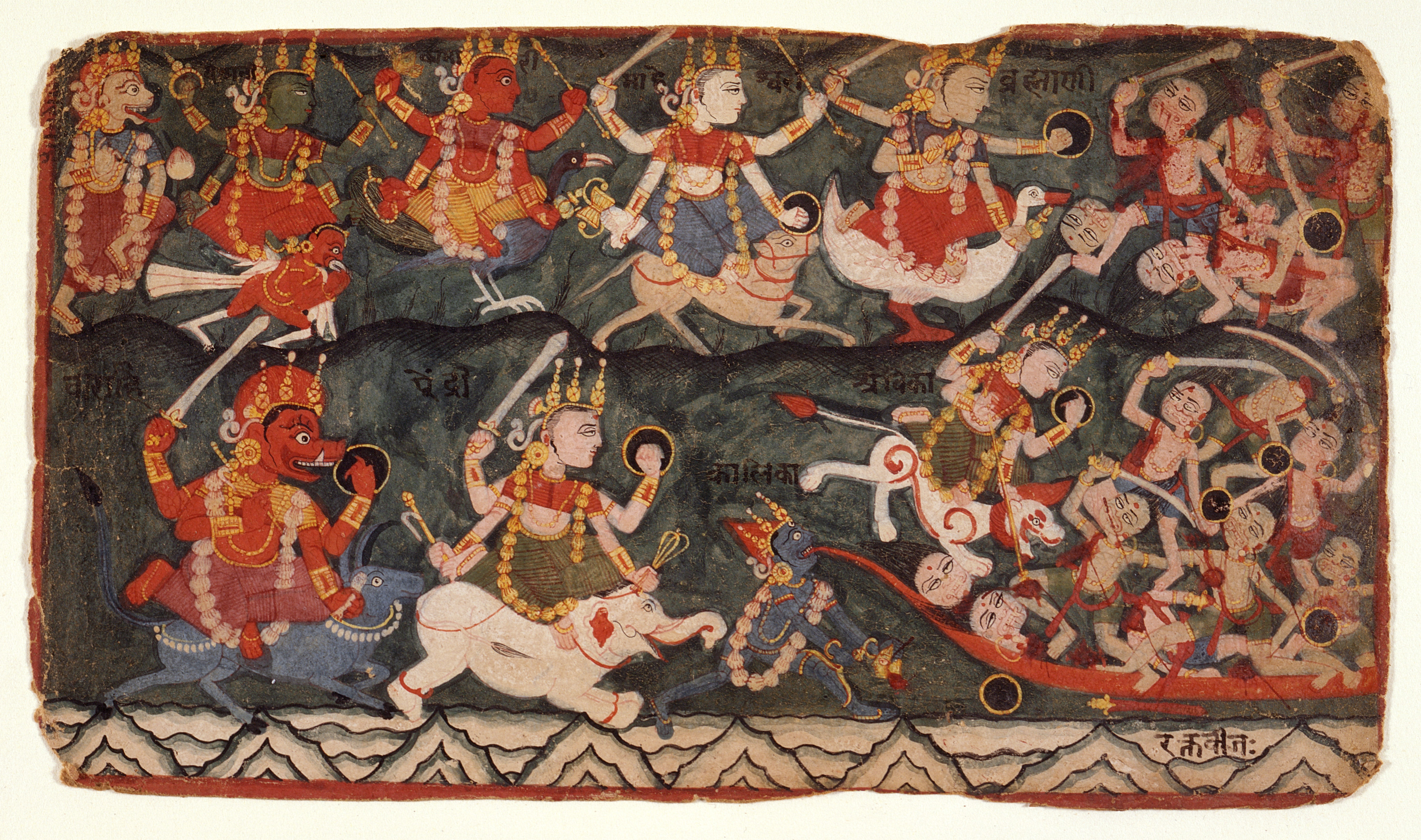
An 18th-century painting of Hindu goddesses Matrikas fighting demons, from LACMA

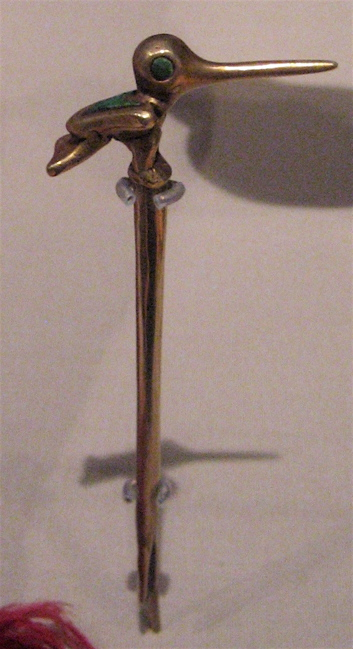
Lime Spoon with cast picaflor, 1250–1470, Peru, Inca. Purchased with funds provided by Lillian Apodaca Weiner (M.2003.77).

On January 8, 2008, Eli Broad revealed plans to retain permanent control of his roughly 2,000 works of modern and contemporary art in the independent Broad Art Foundation, which loans works to museums, rather than giving the art away. Broad, as recently as a year prior, had said that he planned to give most of his holdings to one or several museums, one of which was assumed to be LACMA. However, LACMA remains the "preferred" museum to receive works from the foundation.

Broad, previously vice chairman of LACMA's board of directors, financed the $56-million Broad Contemporary Art Museum (BCAM) building at LACMA; he also provided an additional $10 million to buy two works of art to be displayed in it. BCAM displayed 220 pieces borrowed from Broad and his Broad Art Foundation when it opened in February 2008. In 2001 LACMA was criticized for hosting a major exhibition of Broad's collection without having secured a promised gift of the works, an act that is prohibited at many prominent art institutions because it can increase the market value of the collection.

In 2002 the Annenberg Foundation gave the museum $10 million to establish a special endowment fund to support exhibitions, art acquisitions and educational programs at the discretion of its director. In recognition of the gift, LACMA named its leadership position the Wallis Annenberg directorship. In 2001 Wallis Annenberg endowed a curatorial fellowship program with a $1-million gift. In 1991, the foundation contributed $10 million to LACMA's endowment and in 1999 it donated $100,000 to provide arts education training for Los Angeles elementary school teachers.

In 2001 the museum failed to obtain the modern art collection of Nathan and Marian Smooke, a former museum trustee and industrial real-estate developer whose heirs sold much of his collection at auction rather than donating it.

In 1996 the museum suffered yet another serious blow when the Gilbert Collection of Italian mosaics and other decorative objects, promised as an eventual bequest, and parts of which had been on display for decades, was withdrawn. The would-be donor claimed that the Museum had reneged on a written agreement to provide more exhibit space for it. The collection is considered one of the finest in the world of its kind. Moreover, unlike the Hammer and Simon collections, it did not remain in the Los Angeles area but was removed to the United Kingdom.

Armand Hammer was a LACMA board member for nearly seventeen years, beginning in 1968, and during this time continued to announce the museum would inherit his whole collection. Hammer's collection included works from Van Gogh, John Singer Sargent, Thomas Eakins, Gustave Moreau, Edgar Degas, and Paul Cézanne. When LACMA was offered a collection of works by Honoré Daumier, Hammer bought the works on the promise that he would give them to the museum. To LACMA's surprise, Hammer instead founded the Hammer Museum, built adjacent to Occidental's headquarters in Los Angeles.

Between 1972 and 2020, the Ahmanson Foundation spent about $130 million to finance the museum's acquisitions of 99 artworks, including masterpieces like Magdalene with the Smoking Flame by Georges de La Tour, others by Rembrandt, Watteau and Bernini, and a suite of 42 French oil sketches. The donations were not made with any contractual stipulations that the works remain on view. In 2020, the foundation suspended the acquisition program.

In the early 1970s Norton Simon, the chairman of Norton Simon, Inc., which owned Avis Car Rental, Hunt's Foods, Max Factor Cosmetics, Canada Dry Corp., and McCall's Publishing, among other interests, agreed to take the financial responsibility of the troubled Pasadena Museum of Art. He subsequently donated his extensive collection to the new entity, now the Norton Simon Museum. He had earlier made some indication of donating the work to LACMA.

From 1946 to his death in 1951, William Randolph Hearst was LACMA's largest benefactor. He remains the largest donor to the museum in number of objects. His donations formed the museum's collection of Greek and Roman antiquities, medieval and early Renaissance sculptures, and much of the collection of European decorative arts.

=== Art councils ===
Over the course of the LACMA's history, ten art councils—each supporting a specific area of the collection—have acquired or helped acquire nearly 5,000 works of art for the museum. The art councils are groups of art enthusiasts and professionals who pay a minimum of $400 a year in dues and organize projects to raise money for a favorite department. Founded in 1952, the Art Museum Council is LACMA's first volunteer support council and supports the whole of the museum's endeavors. The Modern and Contemporary Art Council, founded in 1961, is the longest-running support group for contemporary art at any museum in the country. In 1980, the museum's then active Black Historical Advisory Group, led by former trustee Robert Wilson, drove the museum to acquire Extended Forms (1975) by one of America's foremost sculptors Richard Hunt. In 1986 the Annual Collectors Committee weekends were started and have raised a total of $16 million for the purchase of 157 works, valued at $75 million. The Photographic Arts Council, founded in 2001, is the youngest of ten 10 support groups, offering its members visits to artists' studios and private collections, curator-led tours of exhibitions and lectures about the care and conservation of photographs.

=== Collectors Committee ===
Each year a distinguished group of donors contributes directly to the enrichment of LACMA's permanent collection through participation in the Collectors Committee, creating a fund to spend on art through purchasing tickets ranging between $15,000 and $60,000 for the event. Once a year, the Collectors Committee members meet at the museum to hear acquisition proposals from the various curators. Each curator has roughly five minutes to plead their case to the patrons, who vote later that day at a black-tie gala event at the museum on which artworks should become the next acquisitions for the permanent collection. The 2012 gala raised more than $2.8 million. Since its inception in 1986, the event has brought some 170 works of art into the museum's collection.

=== LACMA Art + Film Gala ===
Inaugurated in 2011, the annual Art + Film Gala dinner features entertainment by international artists and is designed to help the museum shore up support from Hollywood leaders. Gala prices range from $5,000 for an individual gold ticket to $100,000 for a platinum table. The 2022 gala raised more than $5.1 million for the museum's operations and collections, up from approximately $4.5 million in 2018, $4.1 million in 2013 and just under $3 million in 2011.

Gala honorees have included Vija Celmins and Denis Villeneuve in 2026; Mary Corse and Ryan Coogler in 2025; Simone Leigh and Baz Luhrmann in 2024; Judy Baca and David Fincher in 2023; Helen Pashgian and Park Chan-wook in 2022; Betye Saar and Alfonso Cuaron in 2019; Catherine Opie and Guillermo del Toro in 2018; Mark Bradford and George Lucas in 2017; Kathryn Bigelow and Robert Irwin in 2016; Alejandro González Iñárritu and James Turrell in 2015; Barbara Kruger and Quentin Tarantino in 2014; Martin Scorsese and David Hockney in 2013; the late Stanley Kubrick and Ed Ruscha in 2012; and Clint Eastwood and John Baldessari in 2011.

=== Deaccessioning ===
Along with other museums that have consigned works to auction in the past, LACMA has been sharply criticized for pruning its art holdings. In 2005, on the occasion of the expansion, reorganization and reinstallation of its collection in 2007, LACMA auctioned 43 works at Sotheby's. The works sold included paintings by Amedeo Modigliani, Camille Pissarro and Max Beckmann, sculptures by Alberto Giacometti and Henry Moore, and works on paper by Pablo Picasso, Henri Matisse and Edgar Degas. The biggest sale of works by the museum since the early 1980s, it was expected to fetch $10.4 million to $15.4 million; it eventually resulted in a total of $13 million. Among the most valuable was a Modigliani portrait of the Spanish landscape painter Manuel Humbert, which sold for $4.9 million.

In 2020, a set of Joseon Buddhist paintings stolen from Sinheungsa temple in 1954 were repatriated to South Korea with cooperation with South Korea's Jogye Order, with its resolution initiating increased collaboration and cultural exchange between the museum and Korean temples.

== Programs ==
=== Art and Technology ===
In 1966 Maurice Tuchman, then curator of modern art at the Los Angeles County Museum of Art, introduced the Art and Technology (A&T) program. Within the program, artists like Robert Irwin and James Turrell were placed, for example, at the Garrett Corporation, to conduct research into perception. The program yielded an exhibition that ran at LACMA and traveled to Expo '70 in Osaka, Japan. It also contributed to the development of the Light and Space movement.

In 2014, the museum opened its Art + Tech Lab, building on the legacy of the original Art and Technology program and its associated 1971 exhibition. Since then, the Art + Tech Lab has presented an annual series of artists’ projects that engage with contemporary technology.

=== Art Parade ===
The LACMA Art Parade is a public art event inaugurated in June 2026. The event is an outdoor "living gallery" located directly in front of the museum's David Geffen Galleries on Wilshire Boulevard in Mid-City, Los Angeles. The inaugural edition feature over 1,400 participants and artists marching down Wilshire Boulevard, including the notable entries and artistic presentations of Gary Baseman, Meow Wolf, mobile sculptures such as an inflatable mirrored 1959 Cadillac, and musical ensembles.

== Management ==
=== Funding ===
Museum Associates, a California nonprofit public benefit corporation, manages, operates, and maintains the Los Angeles County Museum of Art. Los Angeles County provides around $30 million a year, covering more than a third of the museum's operating expenses. By issuing tax-free construction bonds the museum pays for expansion and renovations. LACMA raises around $40 million from donations and membership dues, covering almost half of average expenses of about $92 million. The Museum's endowment, valued at $160 million in 2023, generates up to $10 million a year in income.

=== Attendance ===
Although attendance has grown in recent years, it still remained at 914,356 visitors in 2010. In 2011, around 1.2 million visitors went to LACMA, making it the first time the museum broke the one million mark. In 2015, attendance reached 1.6 million.

=== Directors ===
- Richard (Ric) F. Brown – 1961 – 1966
- Kenneth Donahue 1966 – 1979
- Dr. Pratapaditya Pal - 1979-1980 (Interim Director)
- Earl A. Powell III – 1980 – 1992
- Michael E. Shapiro – 1992 – 1993
- Between 1993 and 1995, Chief Deputy Director Ronald B. Bratton was handling financial and administrative activities and Stephanie Barron, chief curator of modern and contemporary art, was coordinating curatorial affairs.
- Graham W. J. Beal – 1996 – 1999
- Andrea L. Rich – 1999 – 2005
- Michael Govan – 2006–present

In 1996, LACMA's board of trustees decided that the traditional dual role of director as chief administrator/artistic director should be split, and appointed Andrea Rich as president and chief executive officer of the museum, while Graham W. J. Beal ran its artistic programs. As part of a 2005 restructuring, the president position was again made the second-ranking job in the institution.

LACMA provides a home to the director. For that purpose, it has owned a 5,100 sq ft (470 m^{2}) Hancock Park property since 2006. In 2020, Museum Associates acquired a 3,300 sq ft (310 m^{2}) house on a 7,800 sq ft (720 m^{2}) lot in Mid-Wilshire for $2.2 million.

=== Board of trustees ===
LACMA is governed by a board of trustees which sets policy and determines the museum's strategic direction. Board membership is one of the few concrete ways to measure philanthropy in the museum world. LACMA costs $100,000 to join; each board member commits to donating or raising at least another $100,000 a year for the nonprofit museum. The museum currently has over 50 active board members; 30 of them have joined since 2006. Since 2015, the board has been co-chaired by Elaine Wynn and Tony Ressler.

Notable current trustees include the following:

- Al-Mayassa bint Hamad bin Khalifa Al Thani (since 2021)
- Nicole Avant (since 2014)
- Willow Bay
- Colleen Bell (2011–2014, since 2019)
- Thelma Golden (since 2016)
- Mellody Hobson (since 2019)
- Bobby Kotick (since 2004)
- Lee Boo-jin (since 2023)
- Cheech Marin (since 2022)
- Rich Paul (since 2022)
- Lionel Richie (since 2021)
- Carole Bayer Sager
- Ryan Seacrest (since 2014)
- Casey Wasserman (since 2004)
- Elaine Wynn (since 2011)
- Dasha Zhukova (since 2009)

Notable past trustees include:

- Donald Bren (from 1986)
- Brian Grazer (from 2009)
- Bryan Lourd (from 2011)
- Michael Lynton (since 2007)
- Lynda Resnick (from 1992)
- Barbra Streisand (2007–2014)

Notably, Tom Gores stepped down from his post as a board trustee in 2020, after advocacy groups Worth Rises and Color of Change had called for his removal over his investment in Securus Technologies.

== LACMA United ==
Workers at the museum announced in October 2025 that they have organized to form a union called LACMA United under the AFSCME's Cultural Workers United District Council 36. LACMA United said that it seeks fairer pay and benefits, as well as greater transparency from museum leadership. They asked for museum leadership to voluntarily recognize their union by Nov. 5.

Aurora van Zoelen Cortés, a curatorial assistant for contemporary art at LACMA, told the art news website Urgent Matter on Oct. 30 that the workers had not yet decided on precise details for pay or benefits improvements that they would seek.

== Selected paintings ==
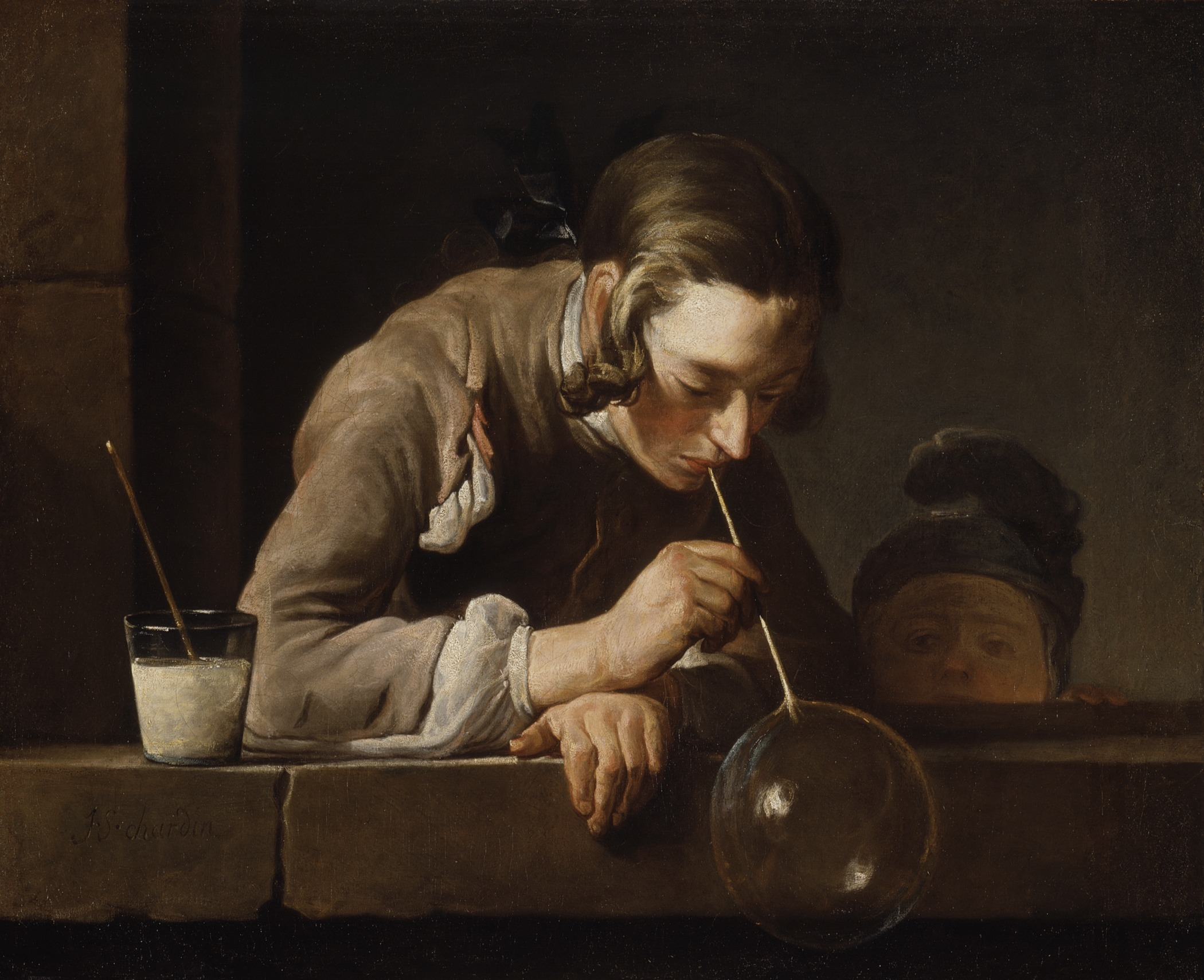
Jean-Baptiste-Siméon Chardin, Soap Bubbles, 1739

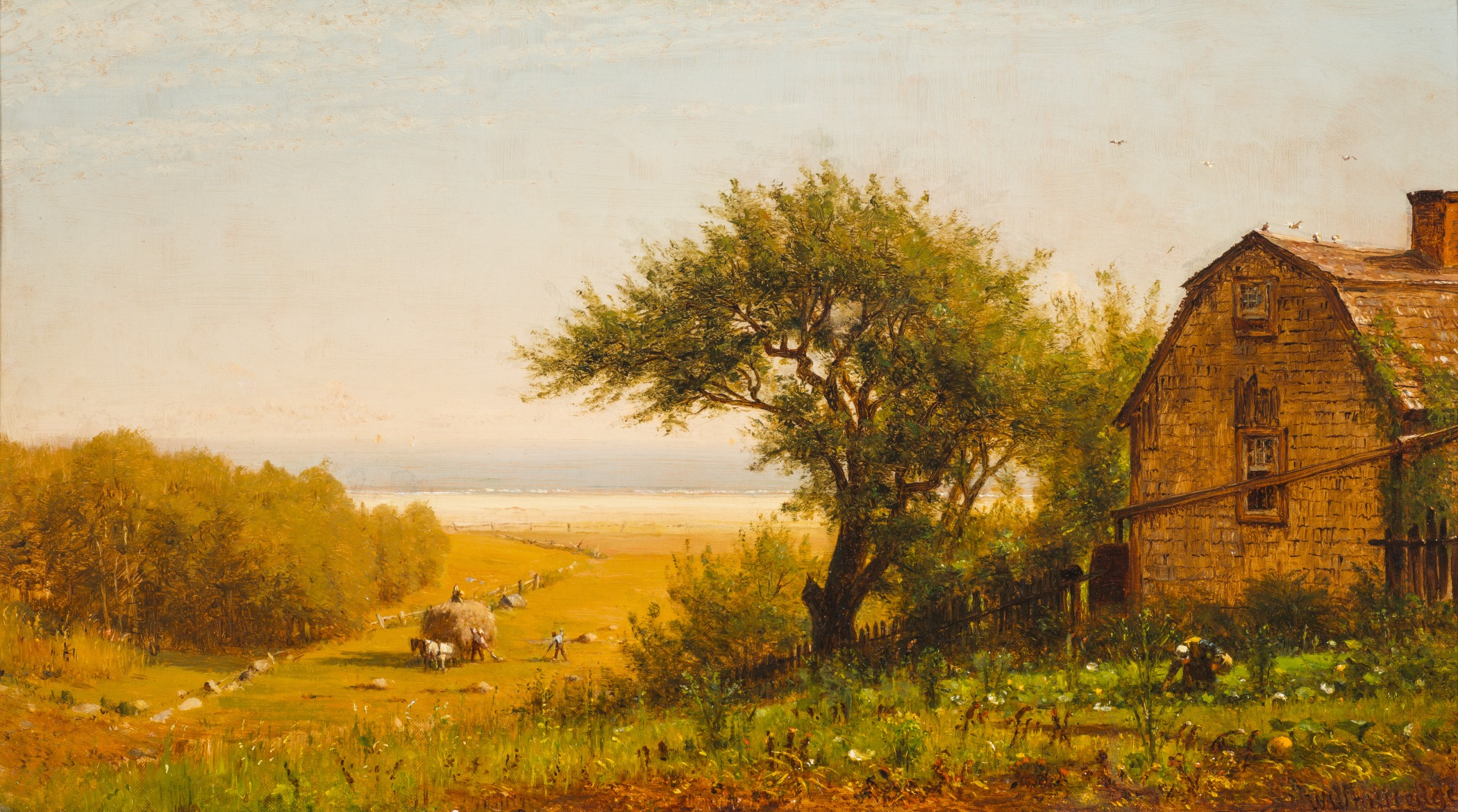
Worthington Whittredge, A Home by the Seaside, circa 1872

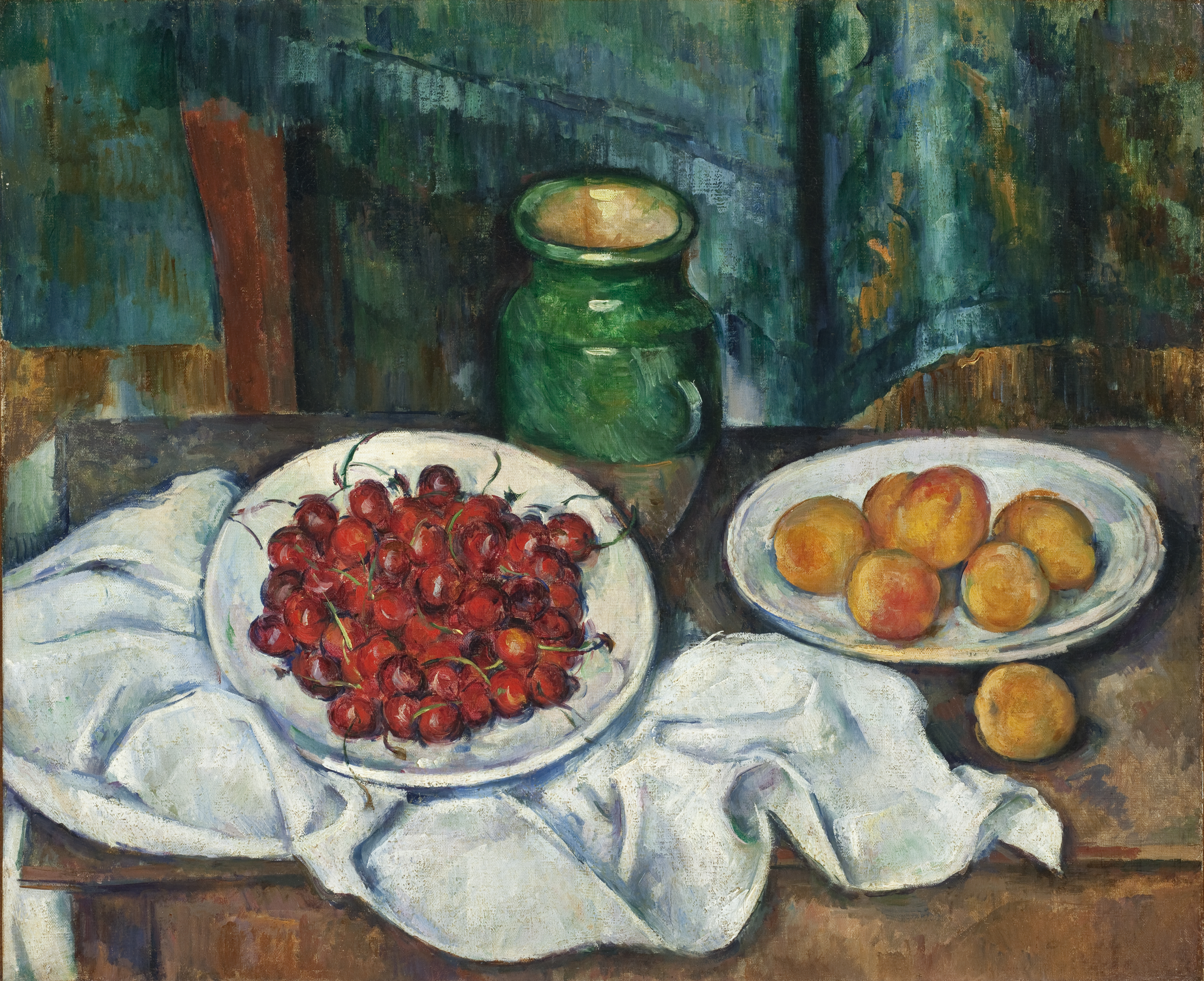
Paul Cézanne, Still Life with Cherries and Peaches, 1885

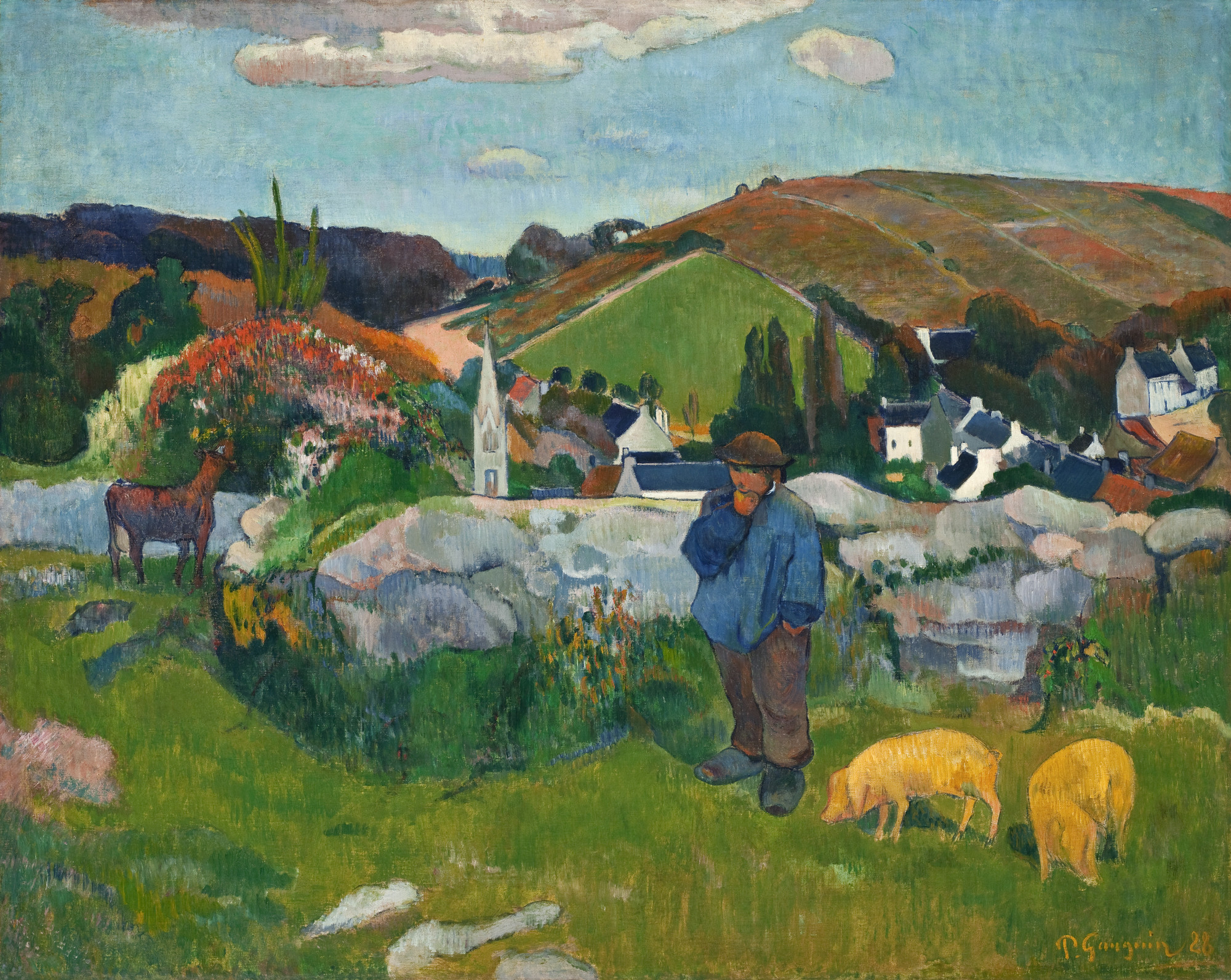
Paul Gauguin, The Swineherd, 1888

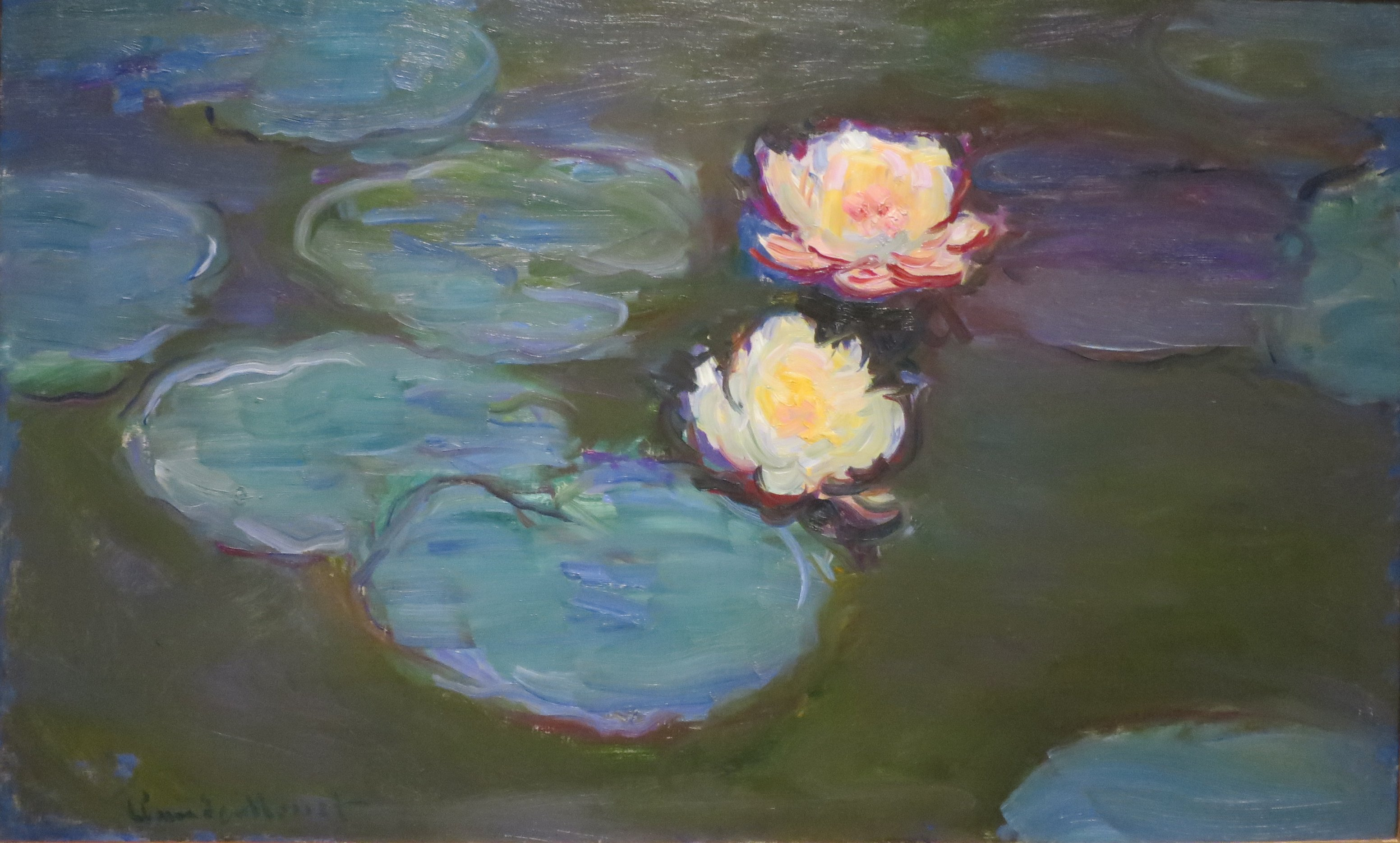
Claude Monet, Nympheas, 1897–1898

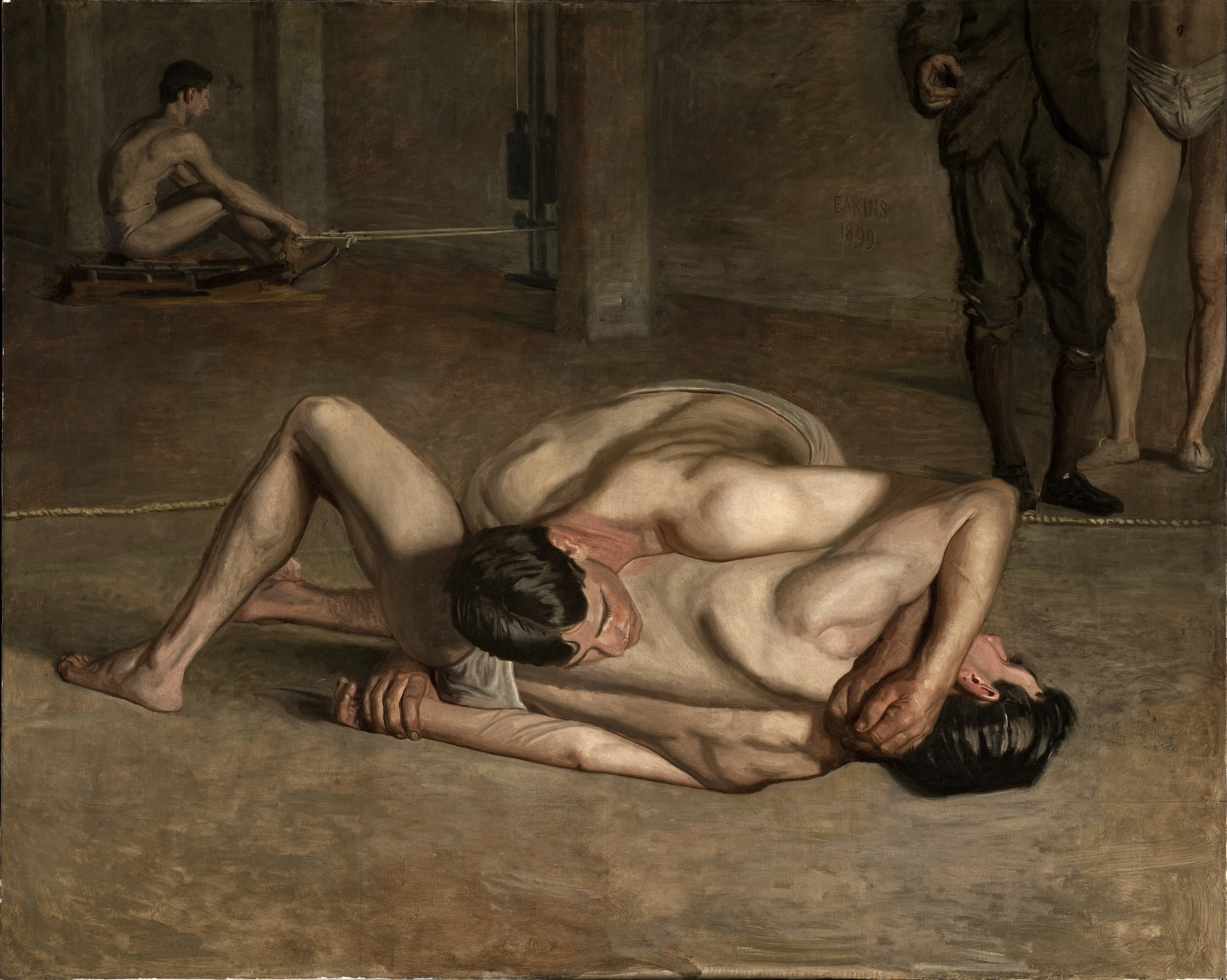
Thomas Eakins, Wrestlers, 1899

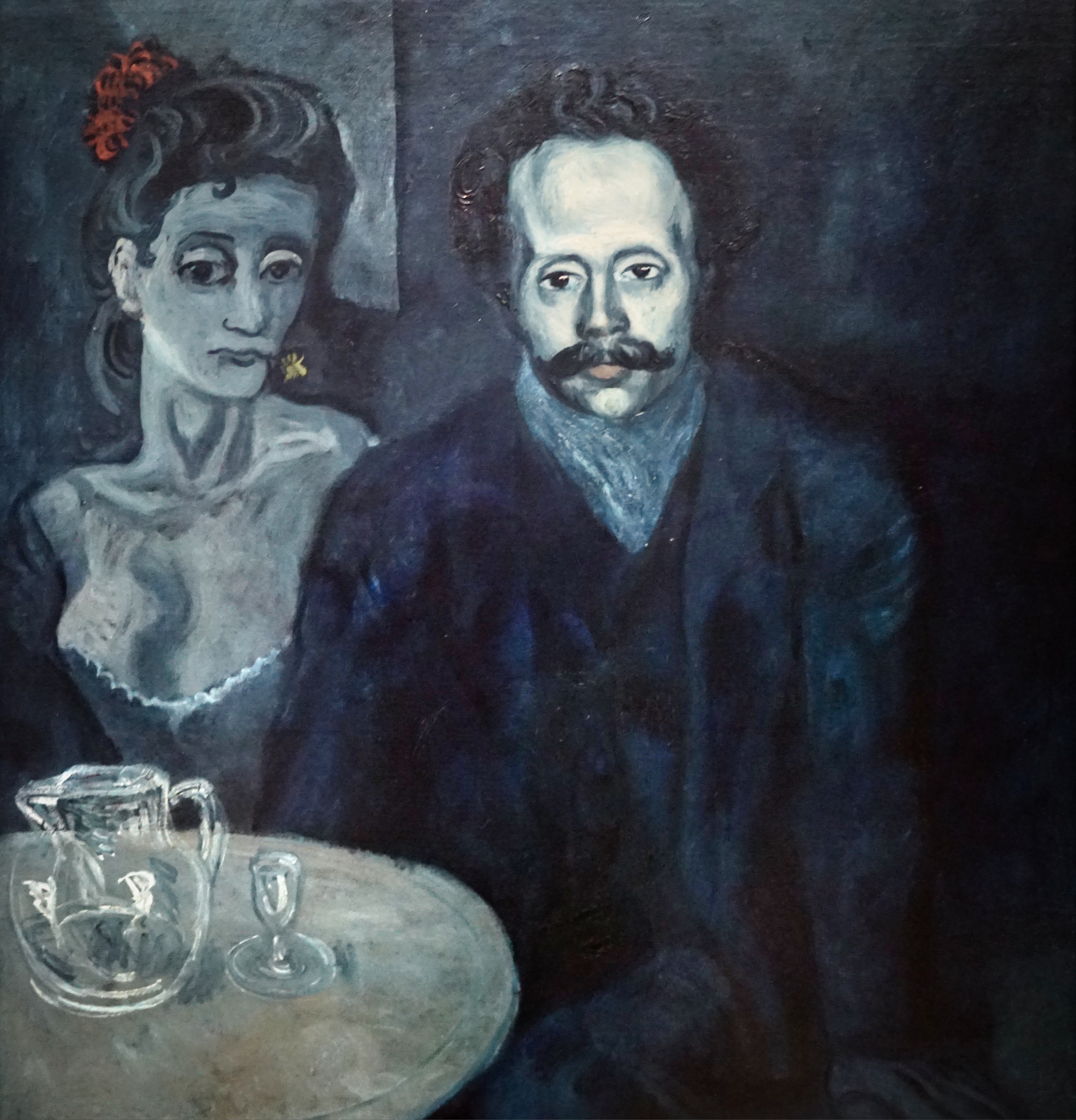
Pablo Picasso, Portrait of Sebastià Junyer Vidal (and a Woman), 1903

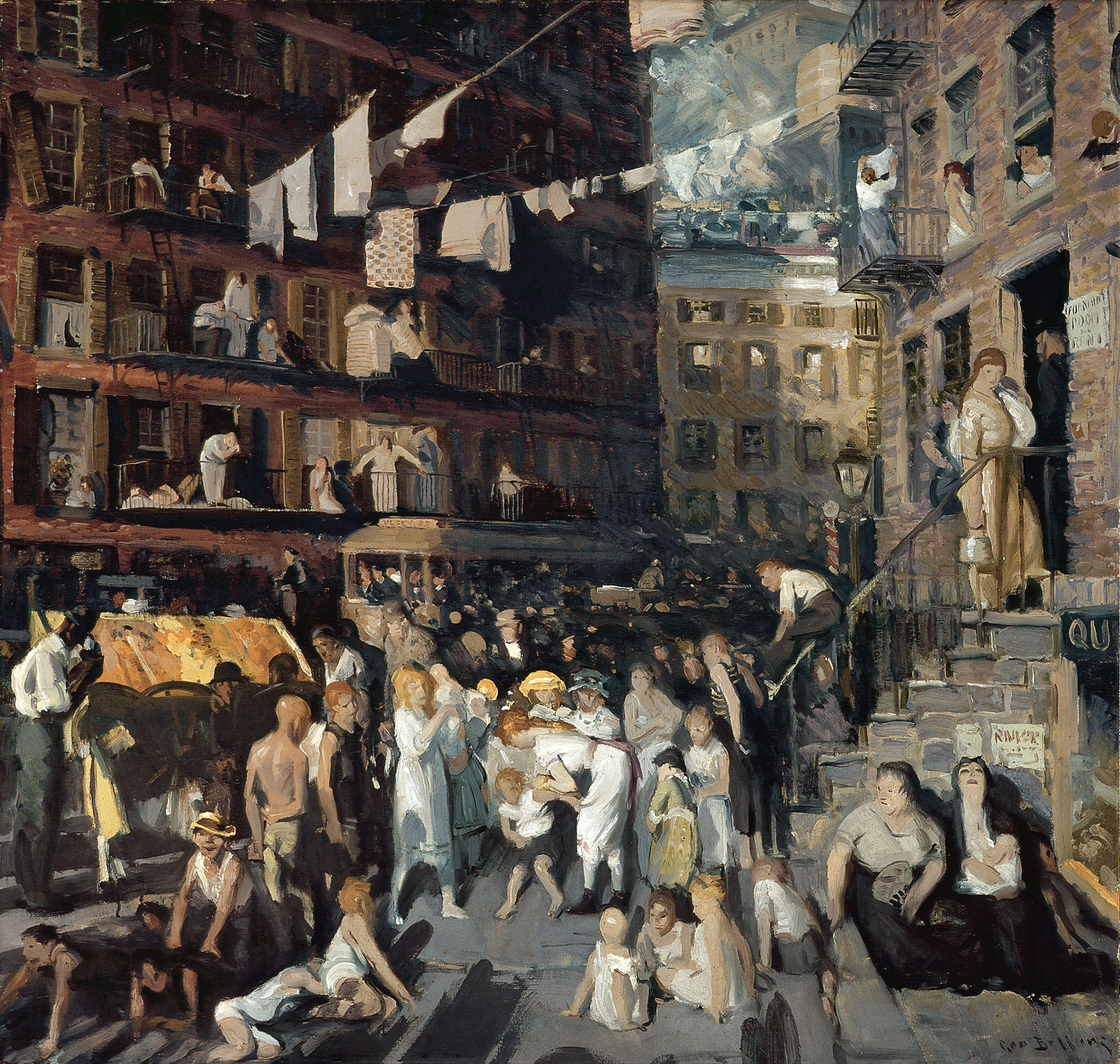
George Bellows, Cliff Dwellers, 1913
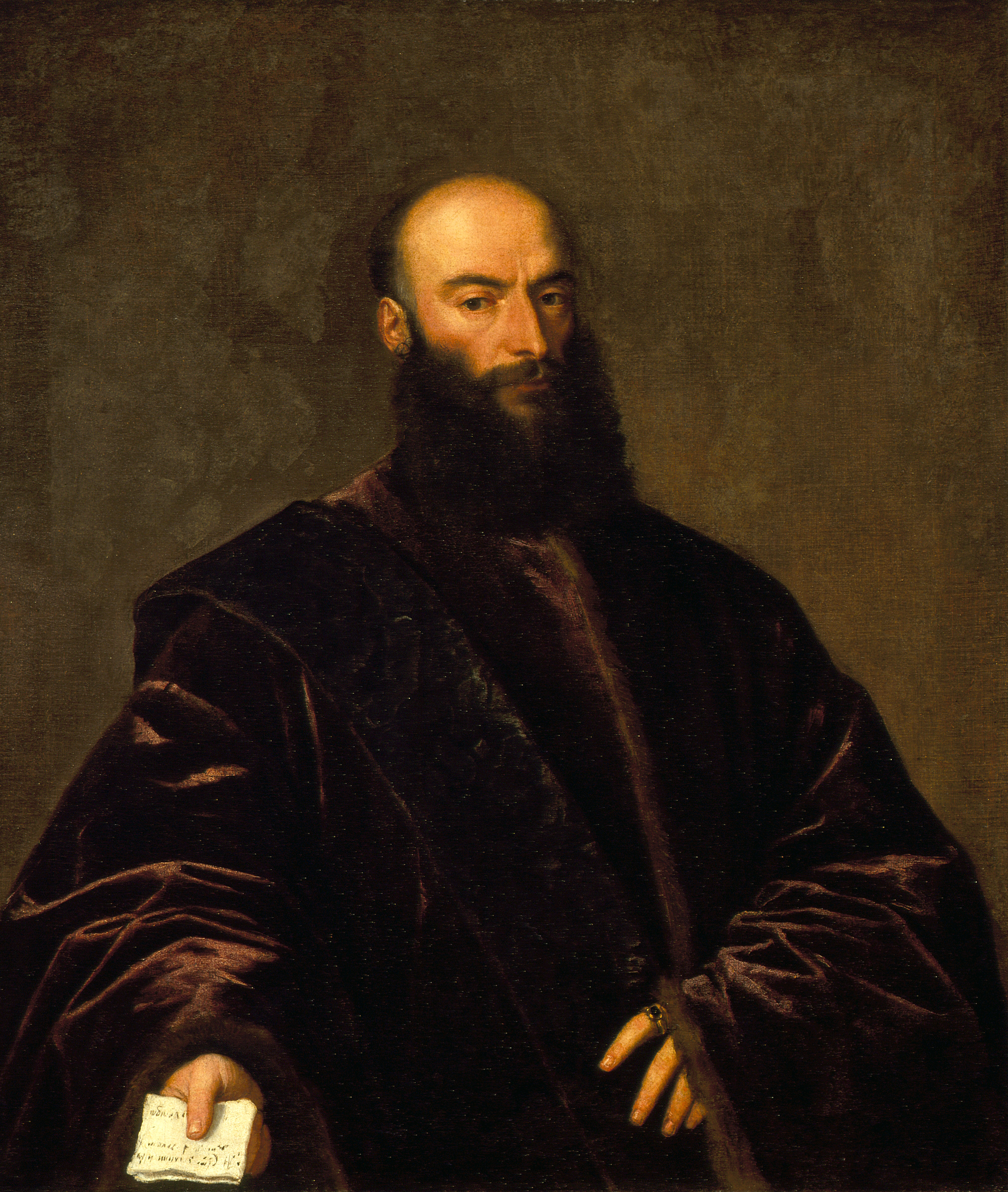
Titian, Portrait of Jacopo (Giacomo) Dolfi, 1532

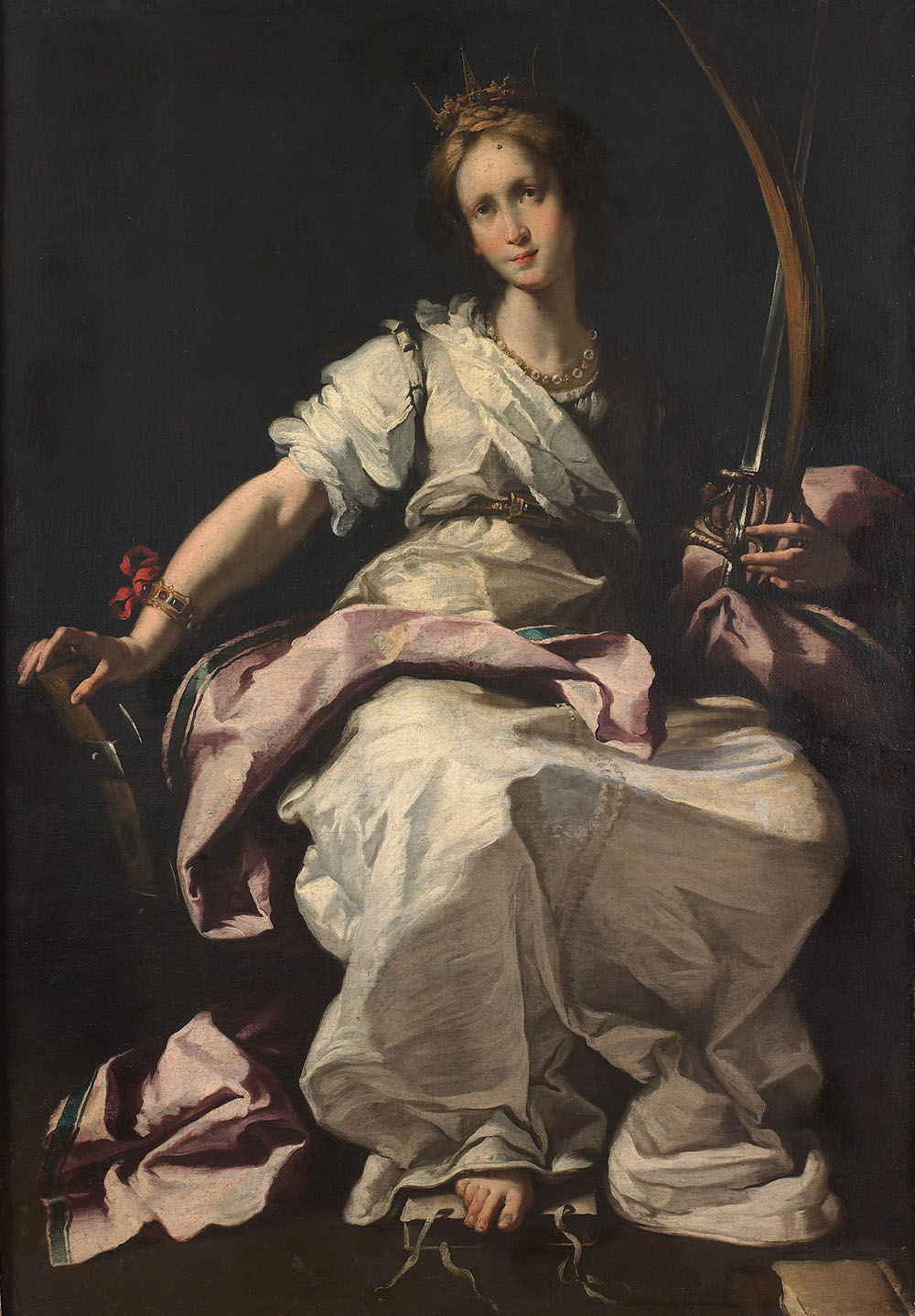
Bernardo Strozzi, St. Catherine of Alexandria, 1615

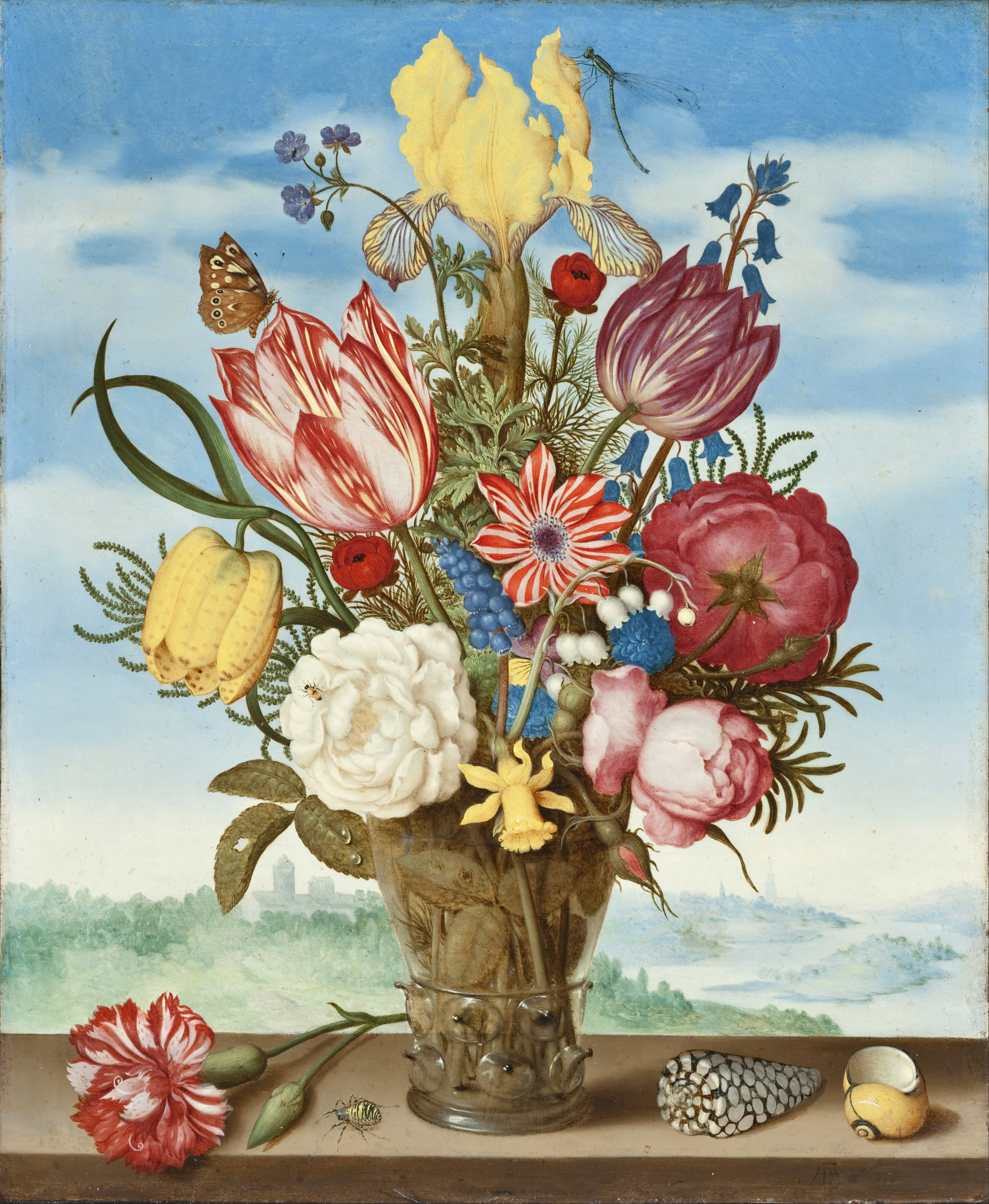
Ambrosius Bosschaert, Bouquet of Flowers on a Ledge, 1619

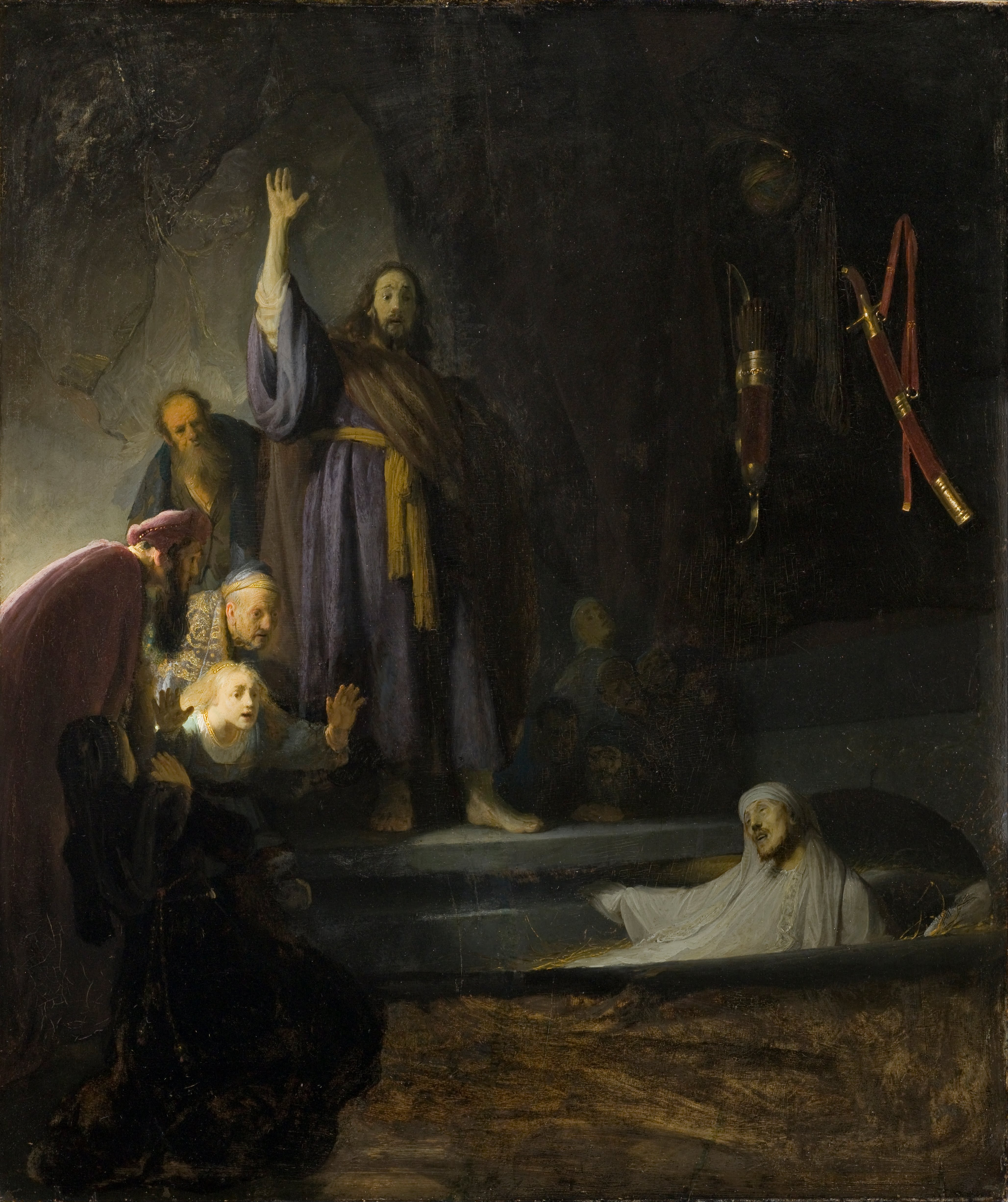
Rembrandt, The Raising of Lazarus, 1630

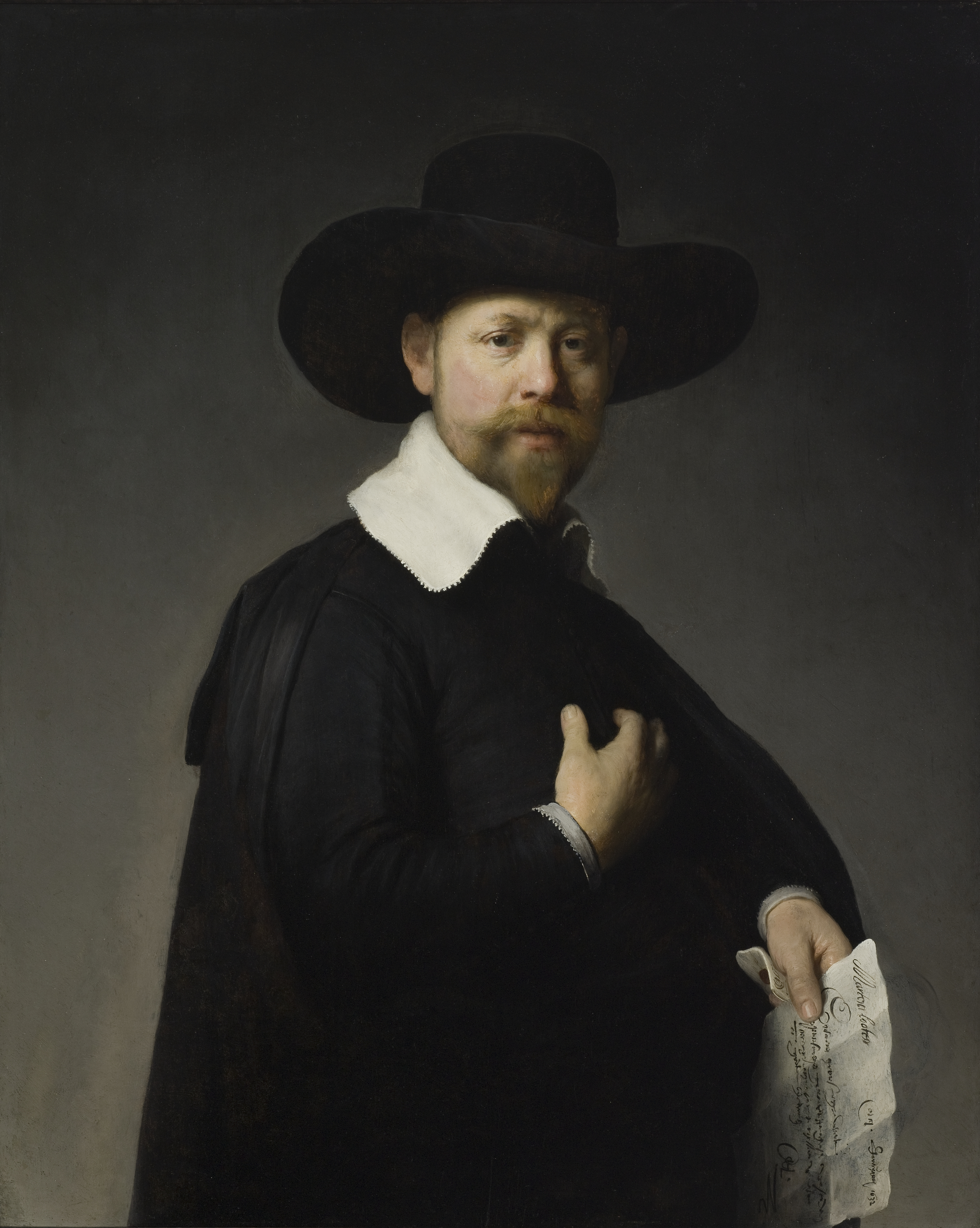
Rembrandt, Portrait of Martin Looten, 1632

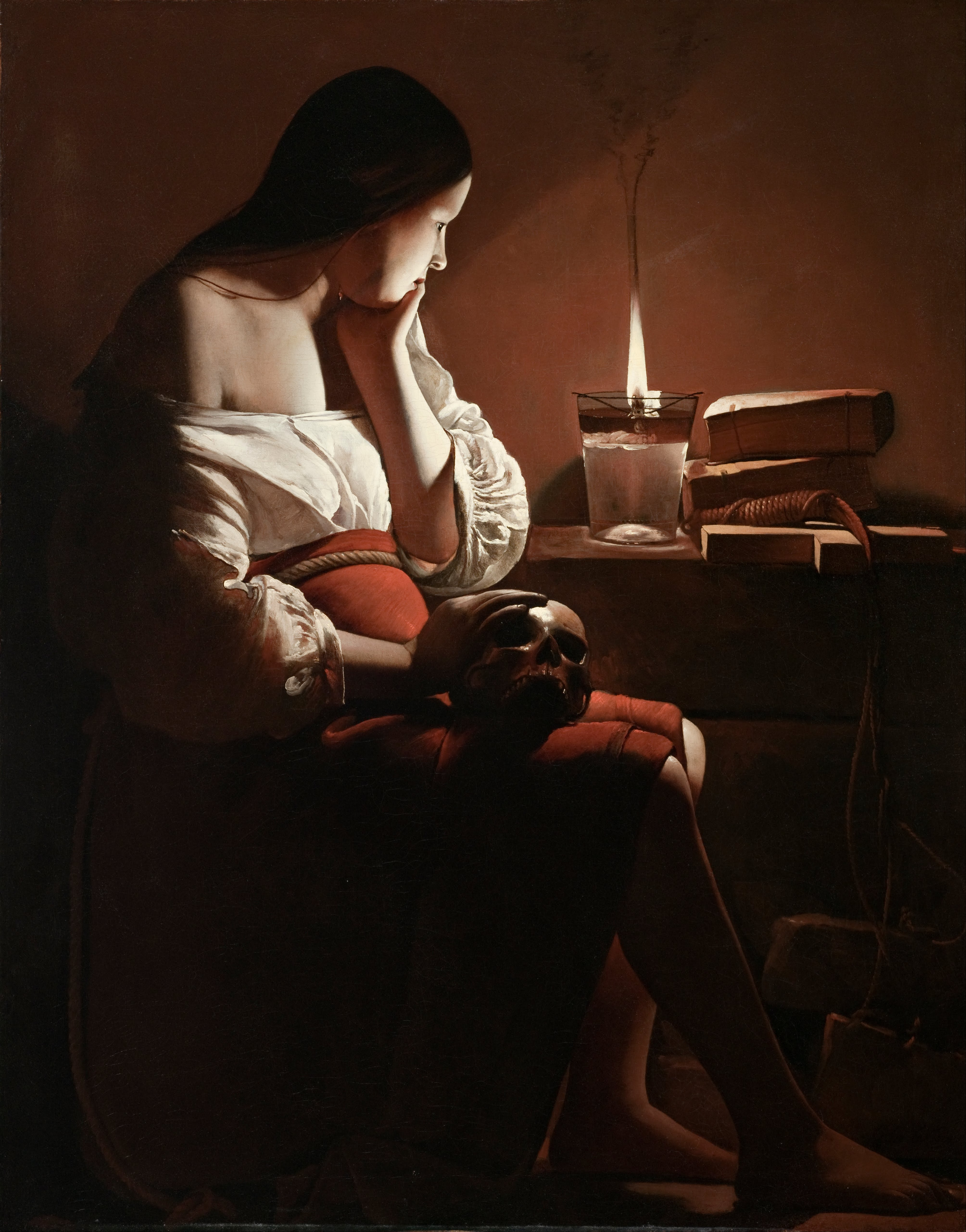
Georges de La Tour, Magdalene with the Smoking Flame, 1640

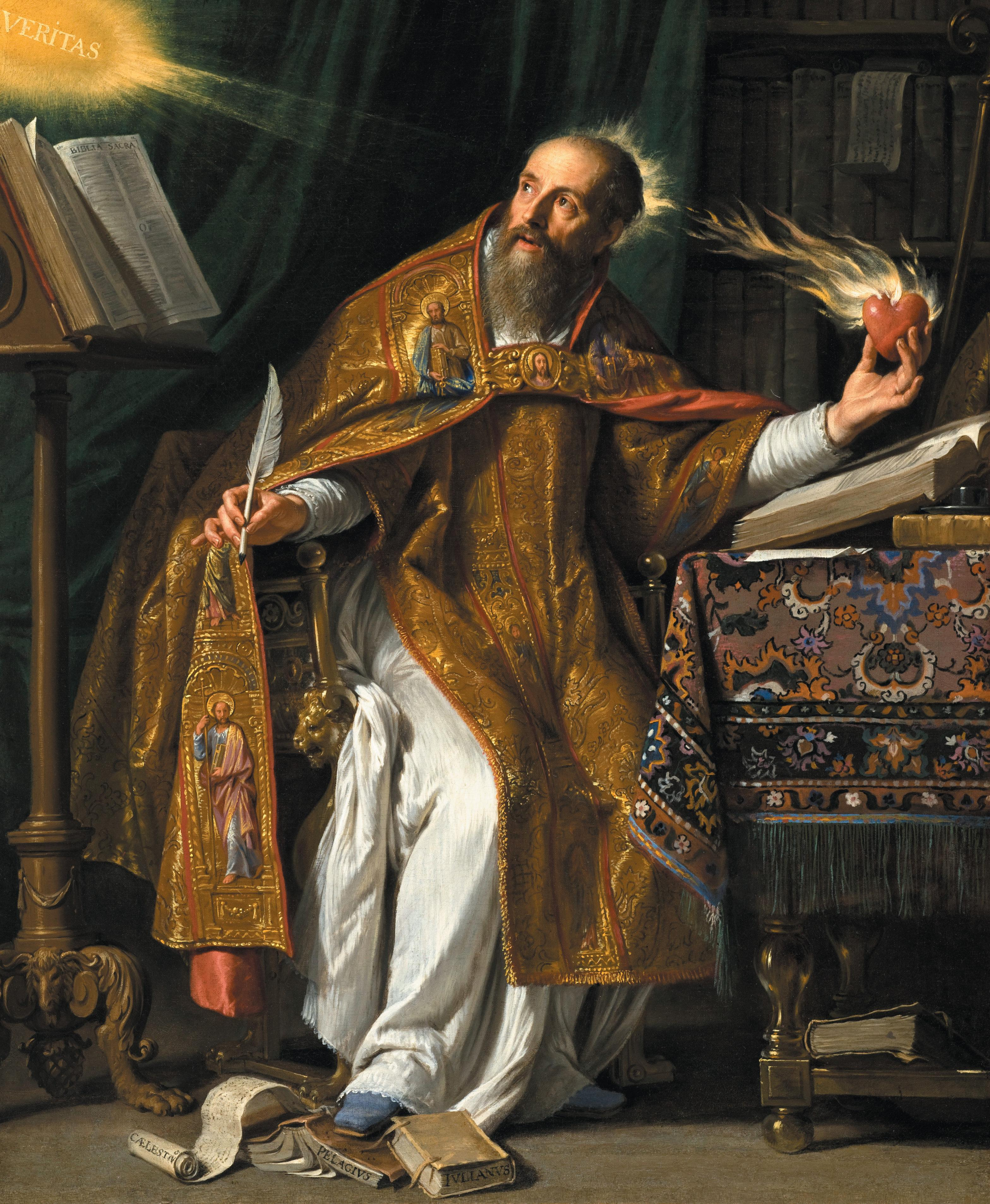
Philippe de Champaigne, Saint Augustine, 1645–1650

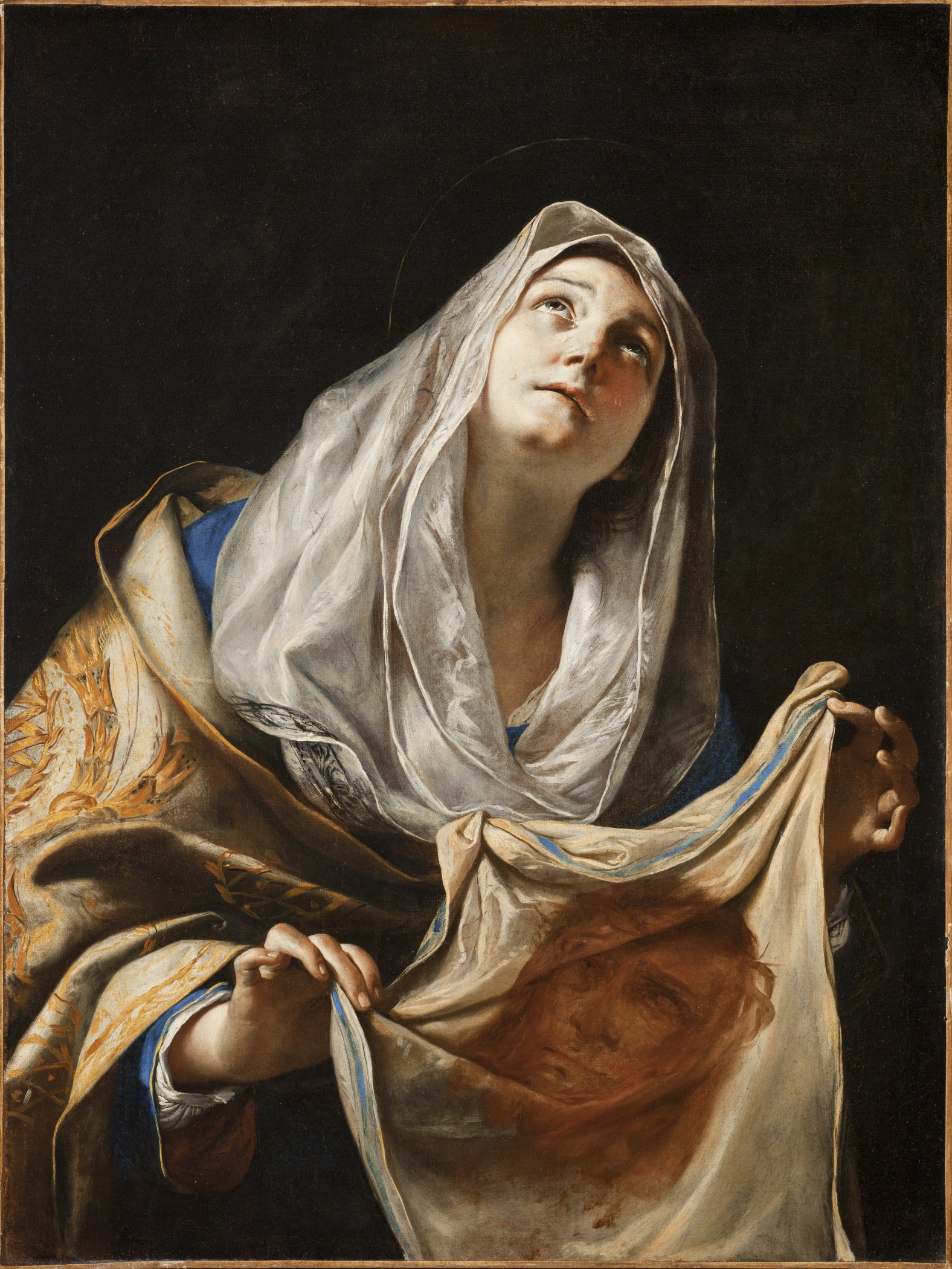
Mattia Preti, Saint Veronica with the Veil, 1655–1660

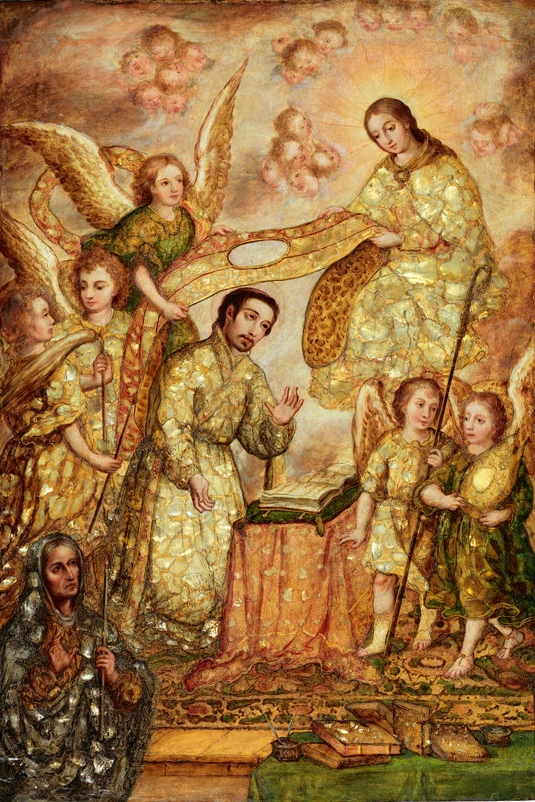
Nicolás Correa, The Imposition of the Chasuble on Saint Ildephonsus, c.1700

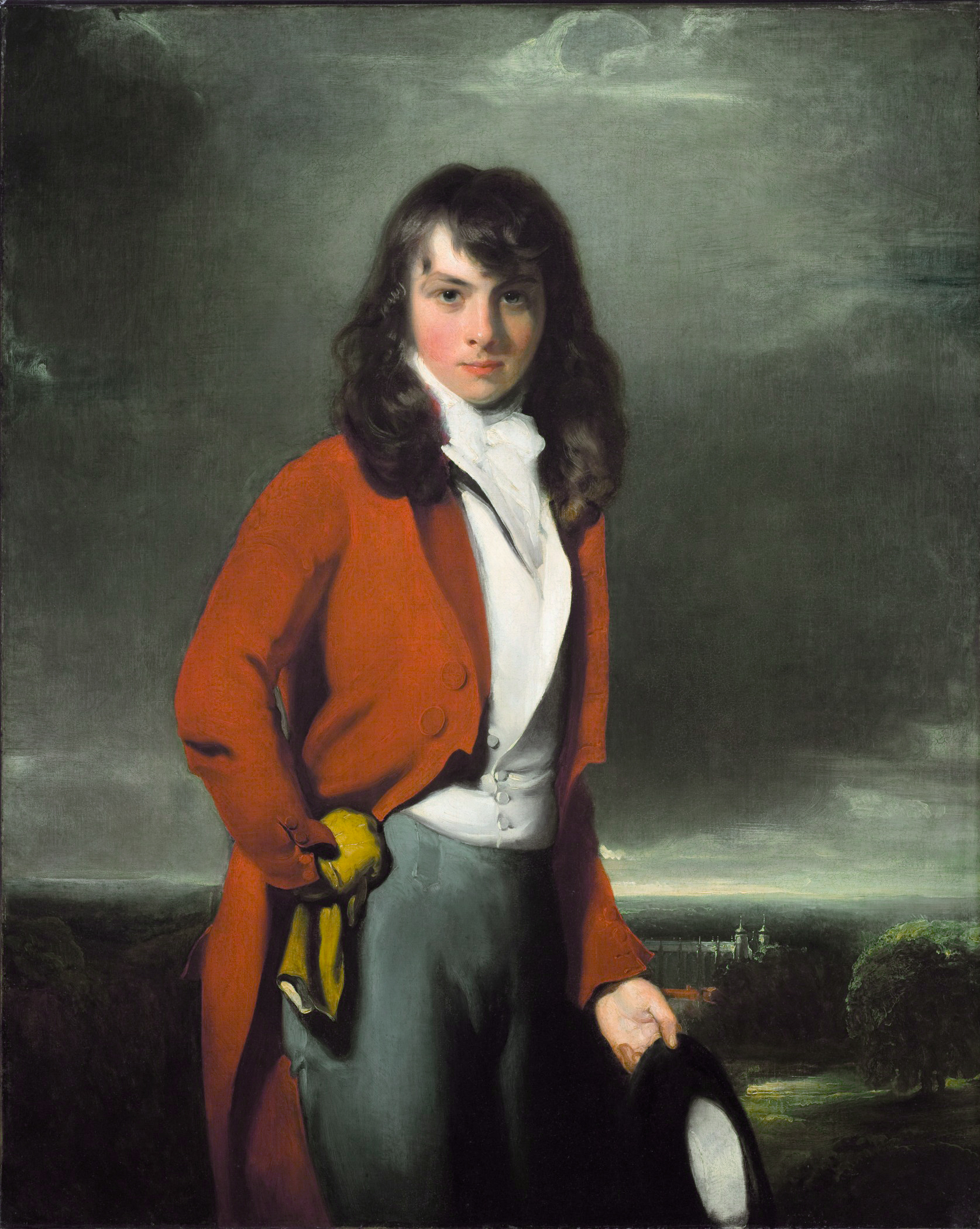
Thomas Lawrence, Portrait of Arthur Atherley as an Etonian, 1791

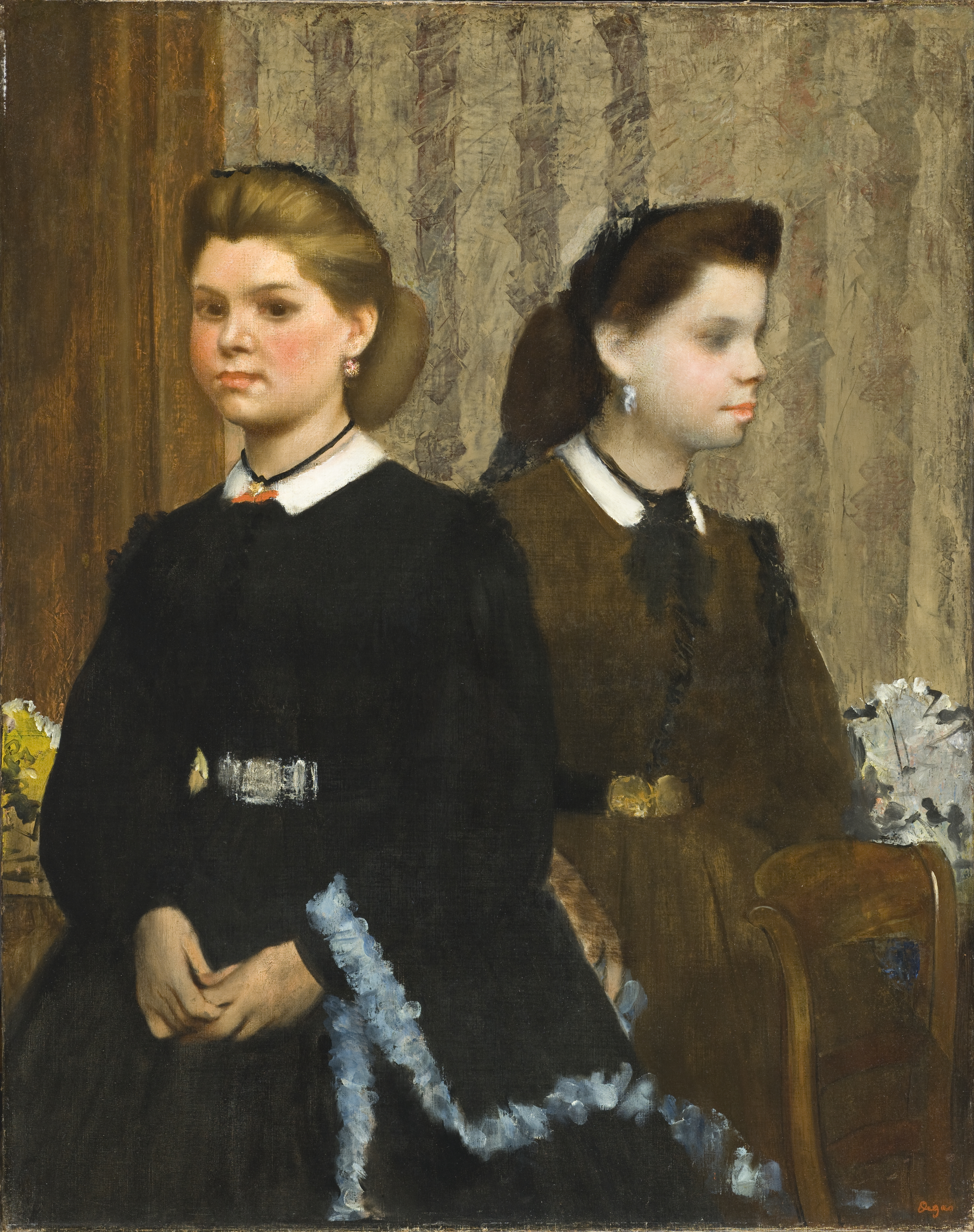
Edgar Degas, The Bellelli Sisters, 1865

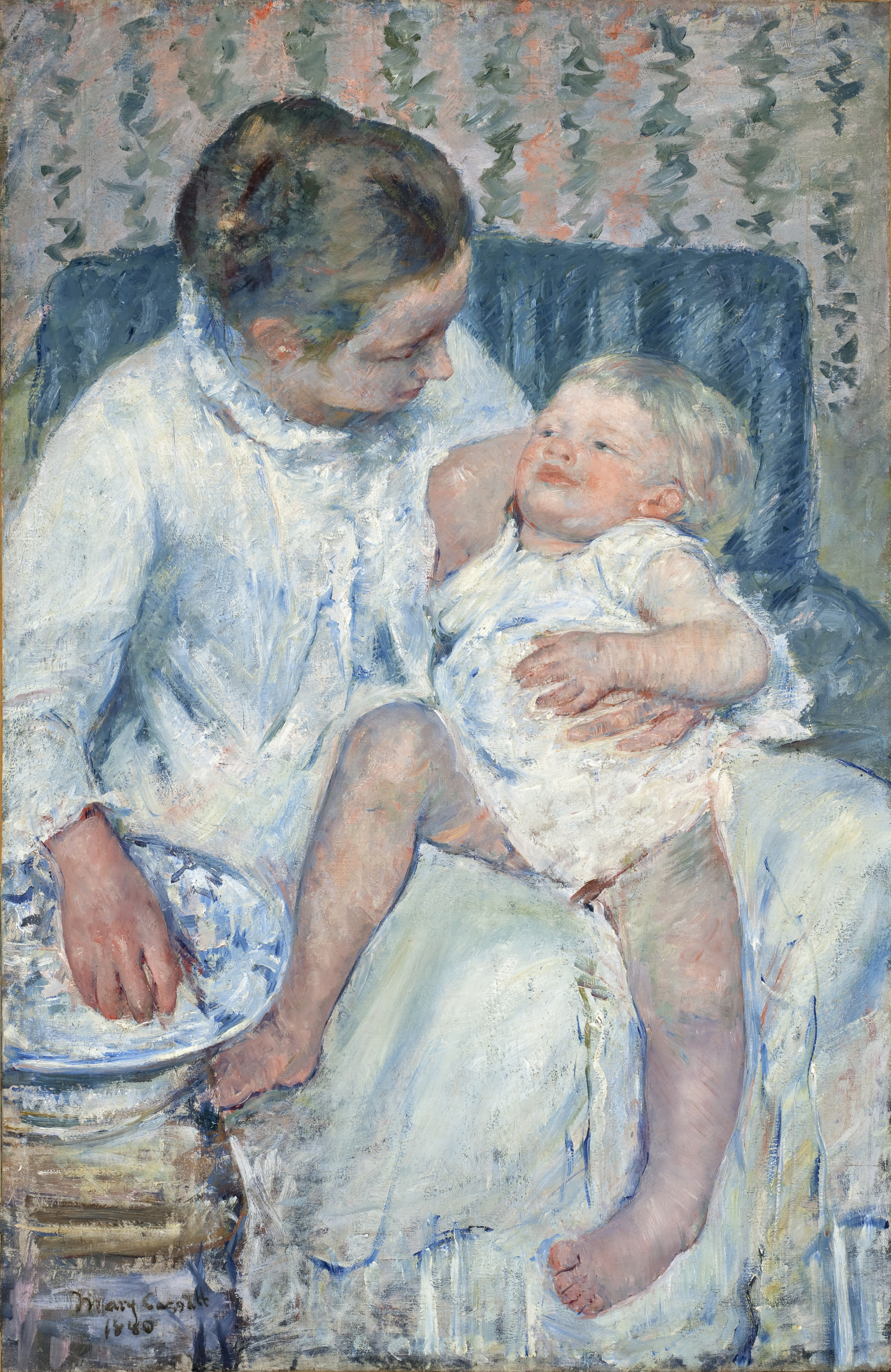
Mary Cassatt, Mother About to Wash Her Sleepy Child, 1880

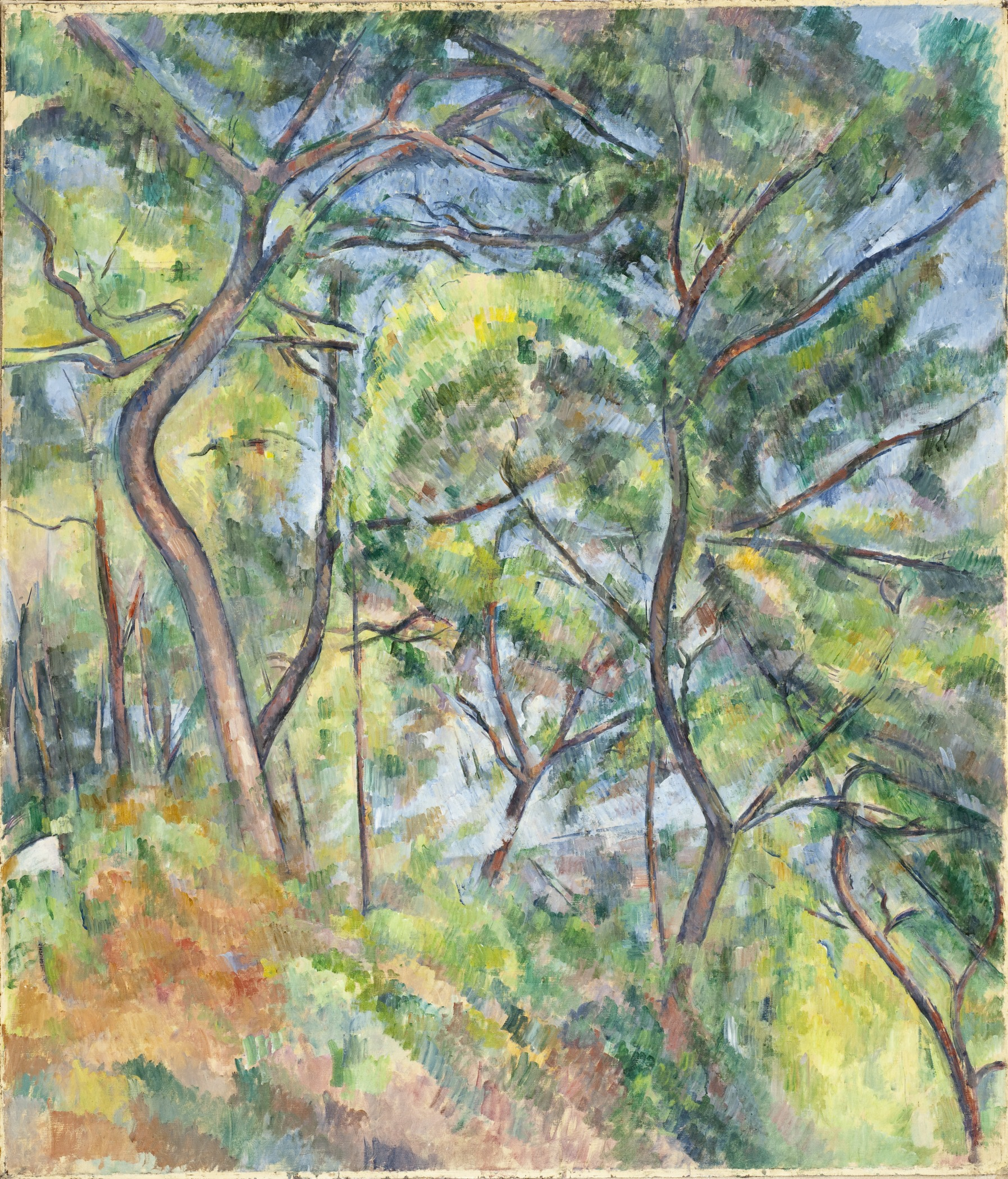
Paul Cézanne, Sous-Bois, 1894

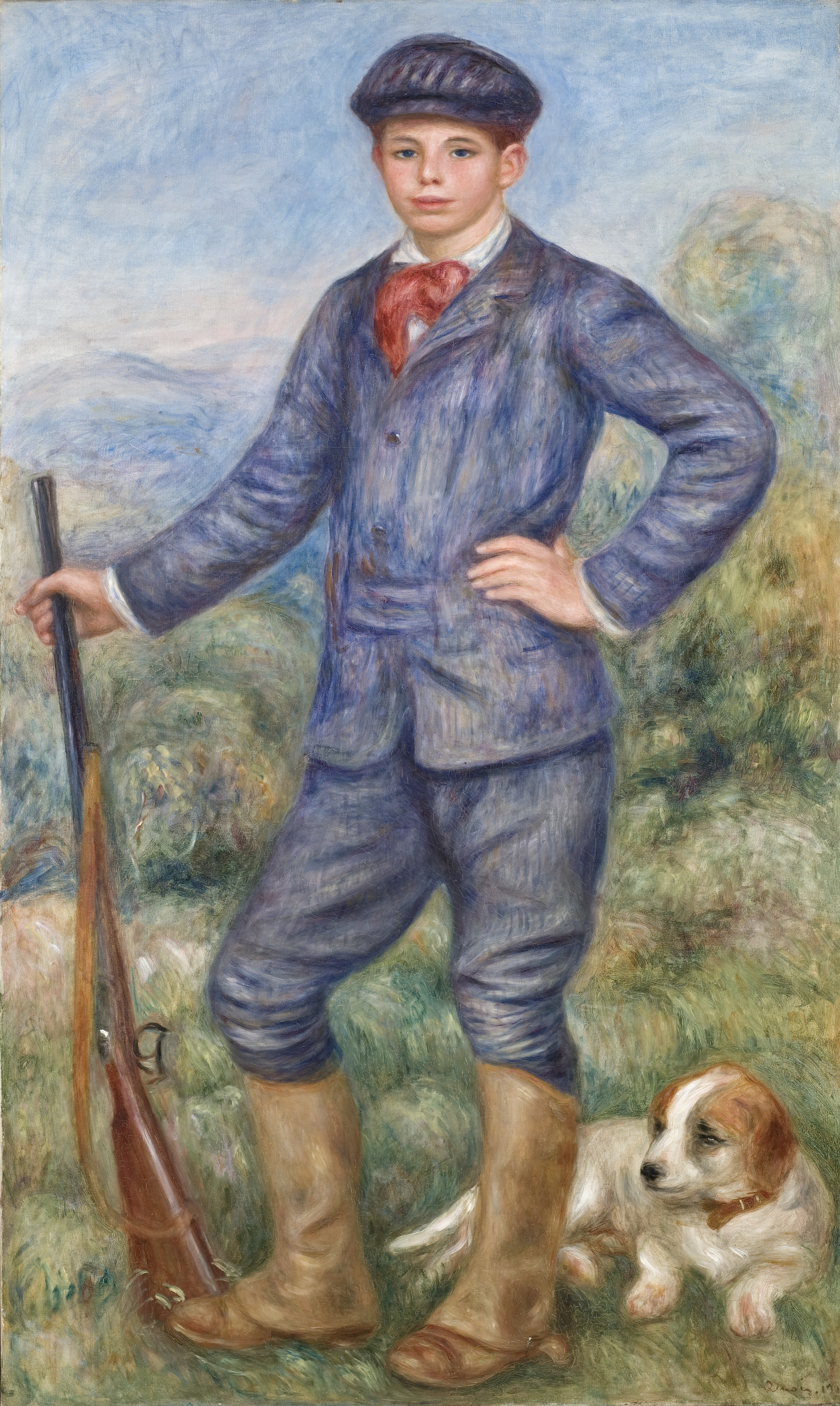
Pierre-Auguste Renoir, Jean Renoir as a Hunter, 1910

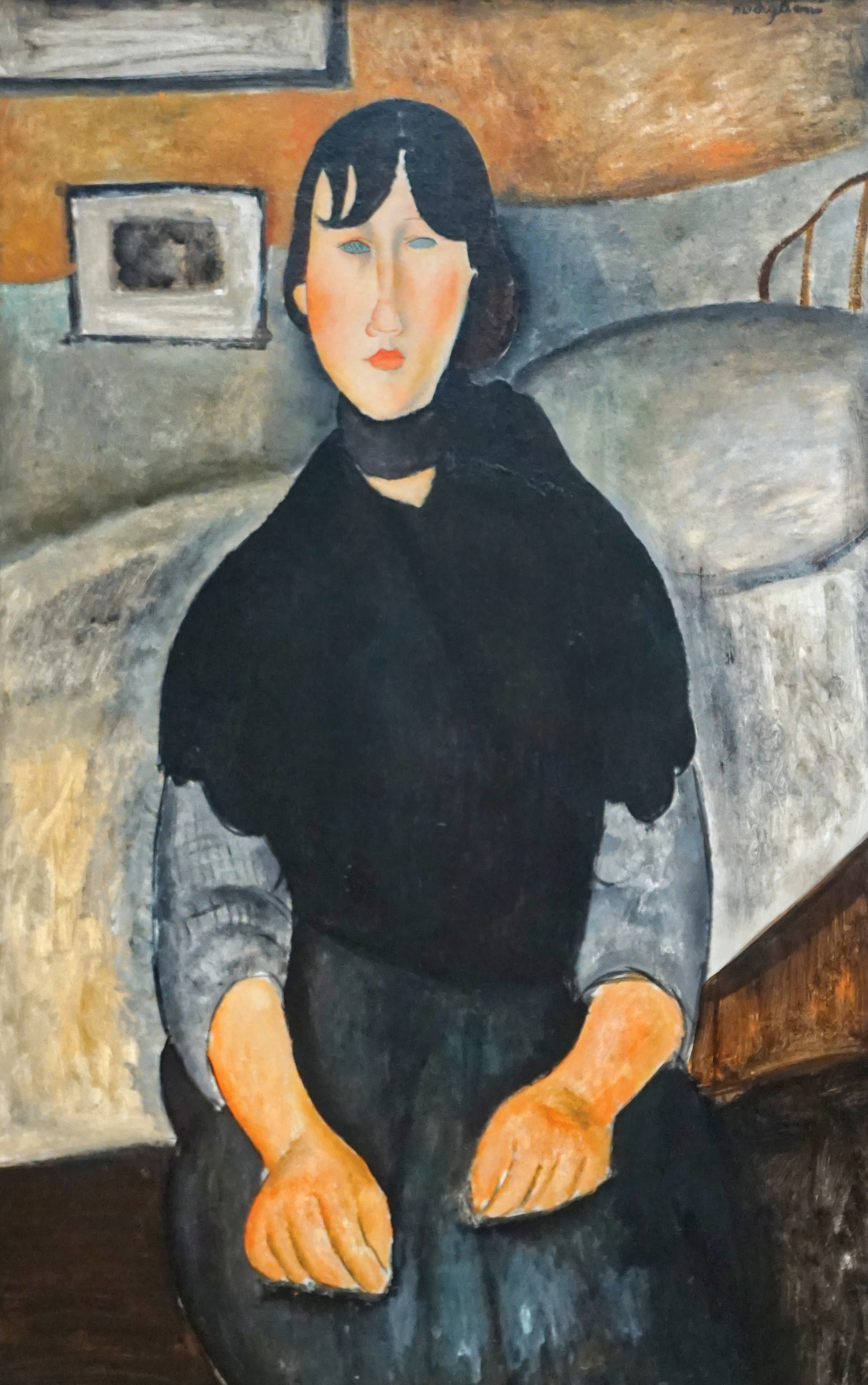
Amedeo Modigliani, Young Woman of the People, 1918

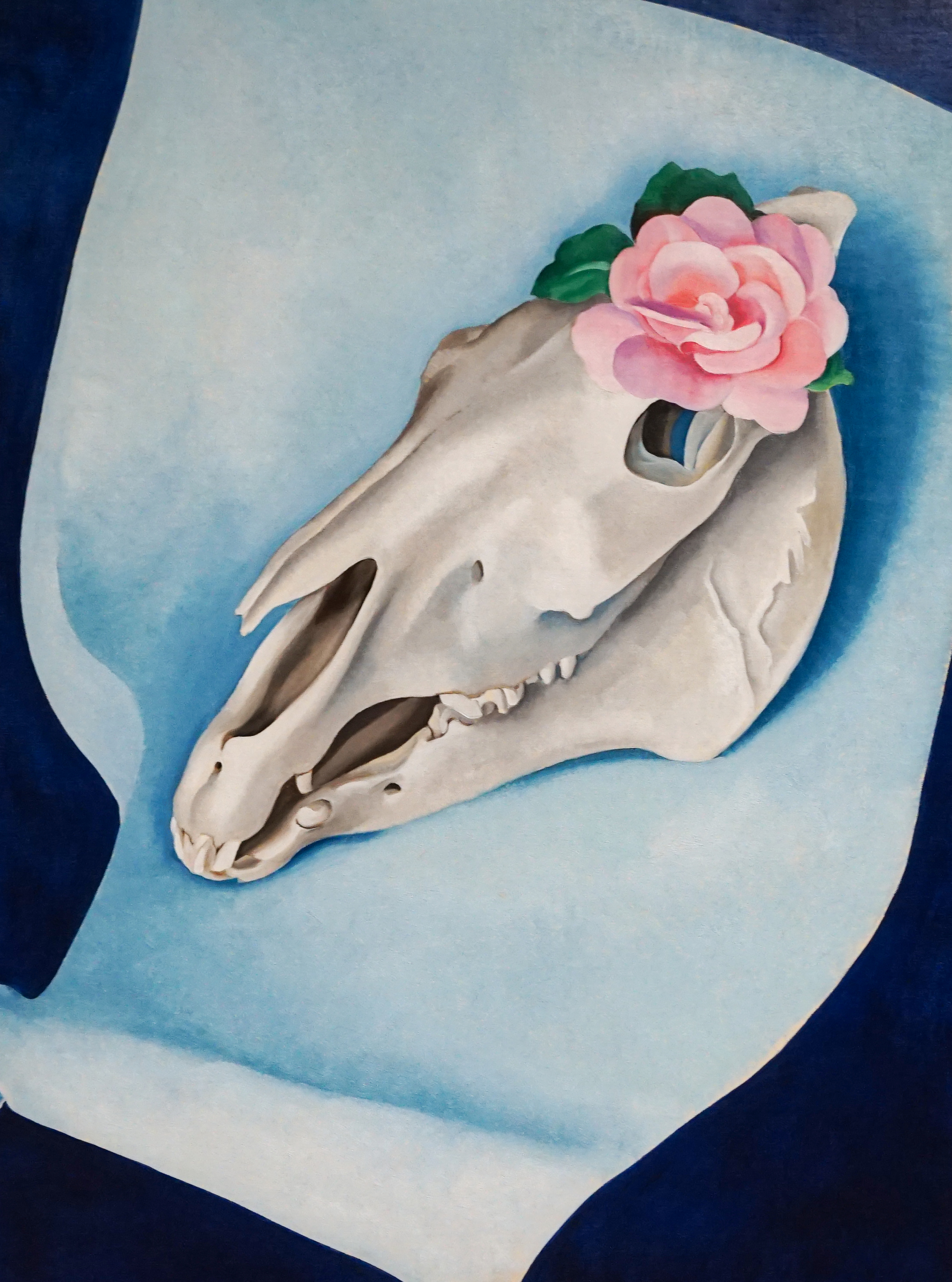
Georgia O'Keeffe, Horse's Skull with Pink Rose, 1931

== Selected objects ==
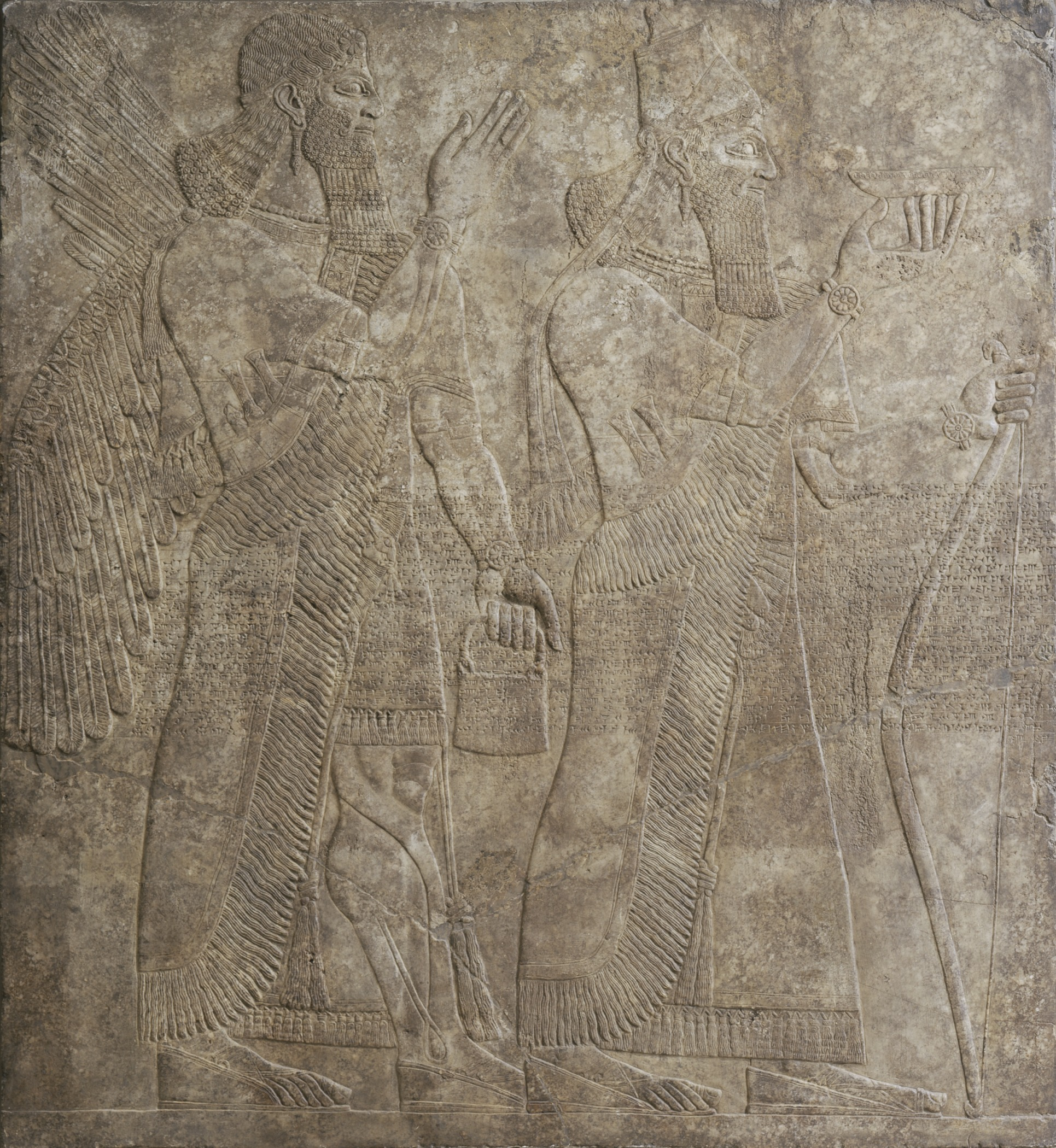
Ashurnasirpal II and a Winged Deity, Northern Iraq, Nimrud, gypseous alabaster, 9th century BC

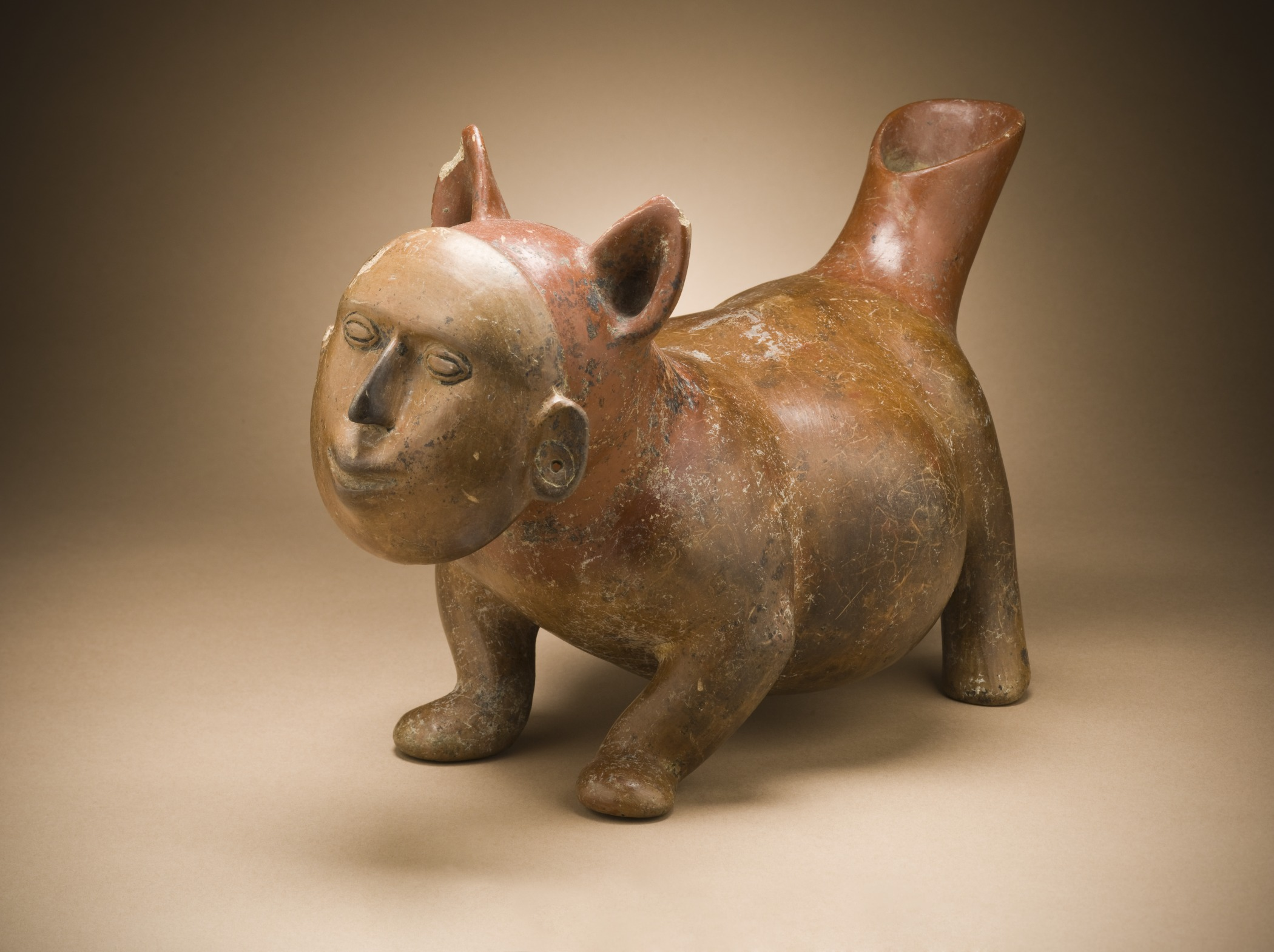
Dog with Human Mask, Mexico, Colima, slip-painted ceramic sculpture, 200 BC–AD 500

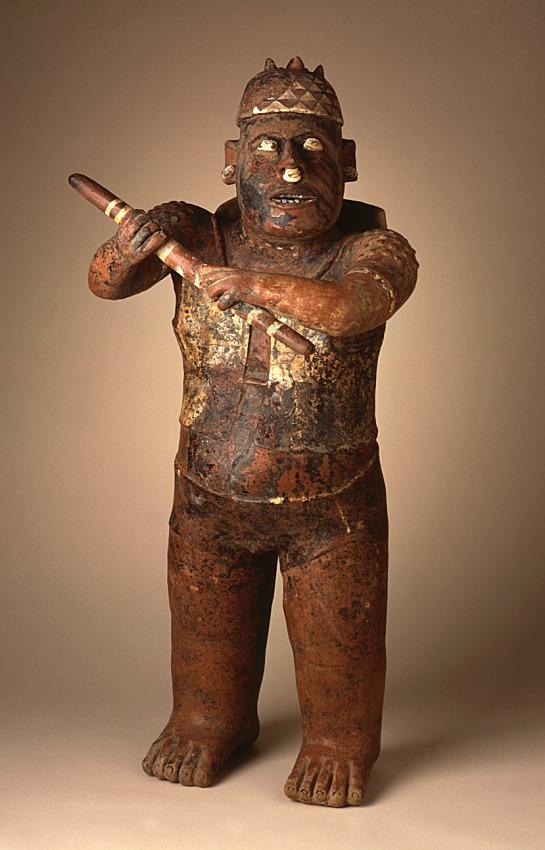
Standing Warrior, Mexico, Jalisco, Slip-painted ceramic sculpture, c. 200 BC–AD 300

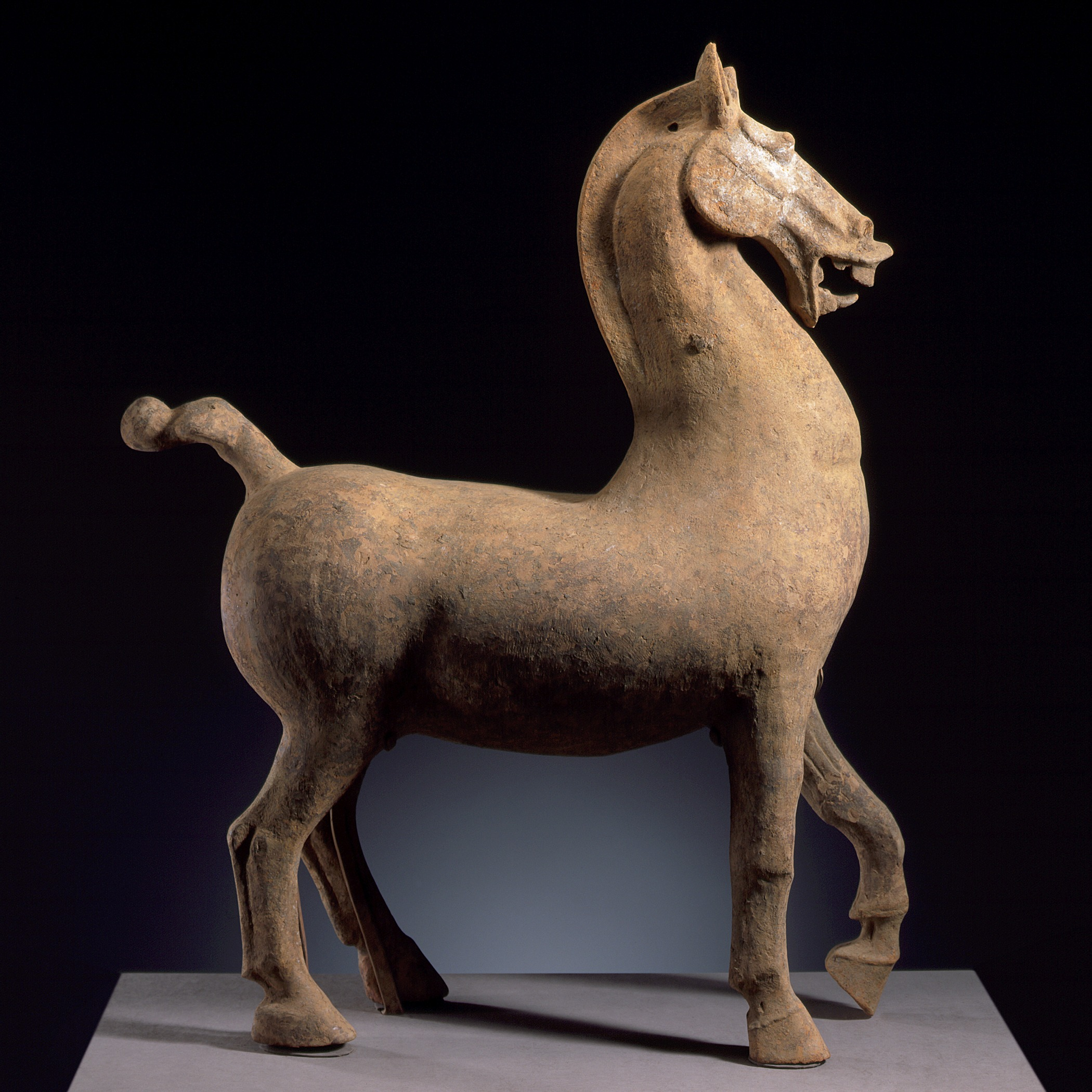
Funerary Sculpture of a Horse, China, Sichuan Province, Eastern Han dynasty, molded earthenware sculpture, 25–220

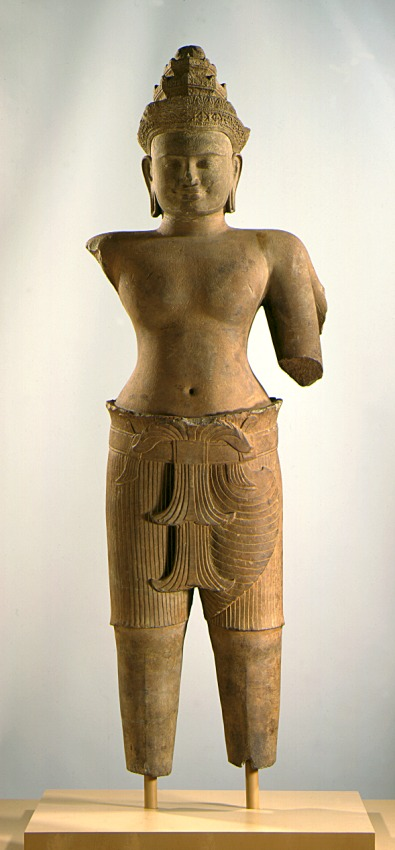
Hindu God Vishnu, Cambodia, Angkor, Pre Rup, sandstone, circa 950

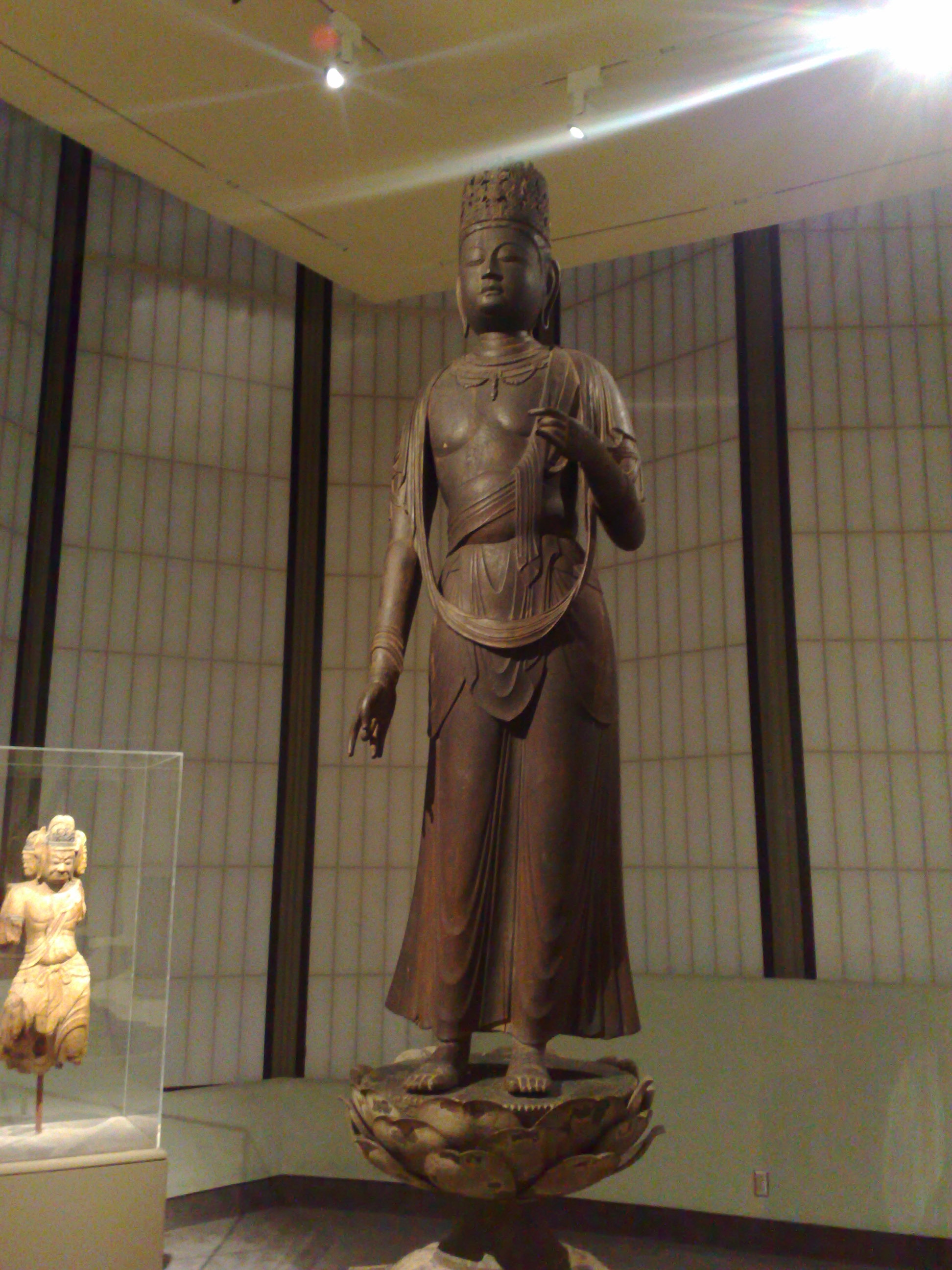
Kannon Bosatsu, Japan, carved wood, 12th century

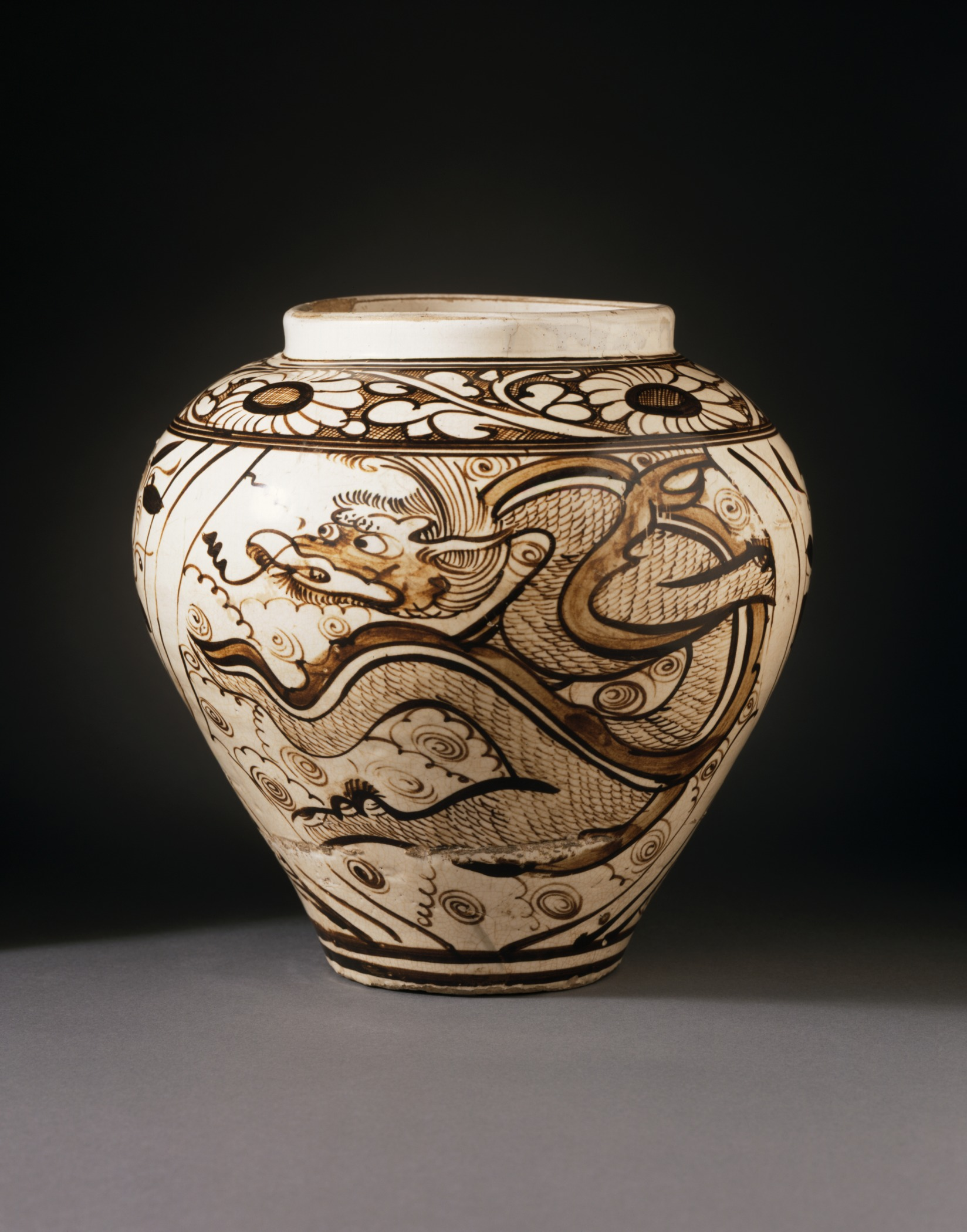
Jar (Ping) with Dragon and Clouds, China, Hebei or Henan Province, Yuan dynasty, Cizhou ware, 1279–1368

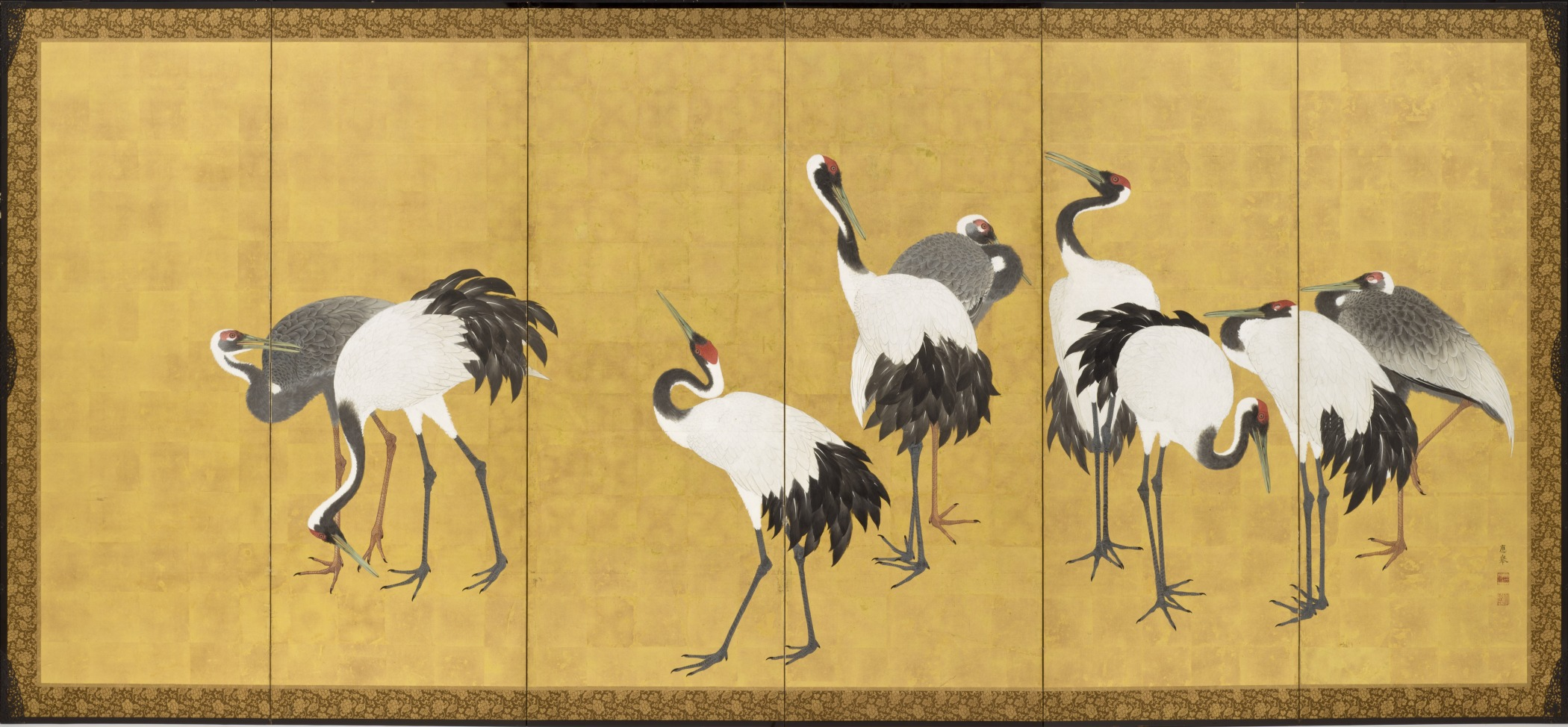
Maruyama Ōkyo, Cranes, Japan, pair of six-panel screens; ink, color, and gold leaf on paper, 1772

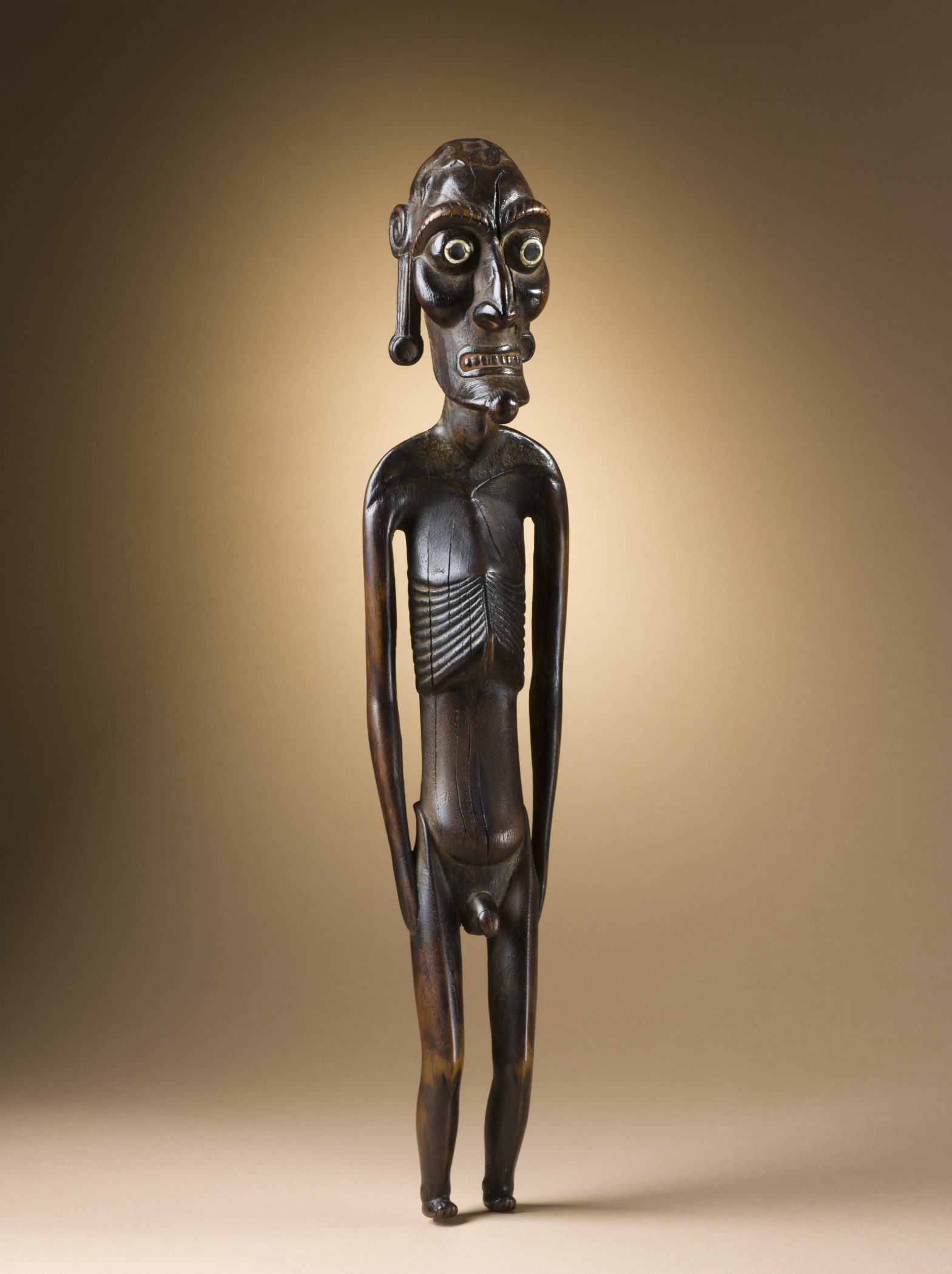
Ancestor Figure (moai kavakava), Easter Island (Rapa Nui), wood, bird bone, obsidian, and traces of pigment, circa 1830

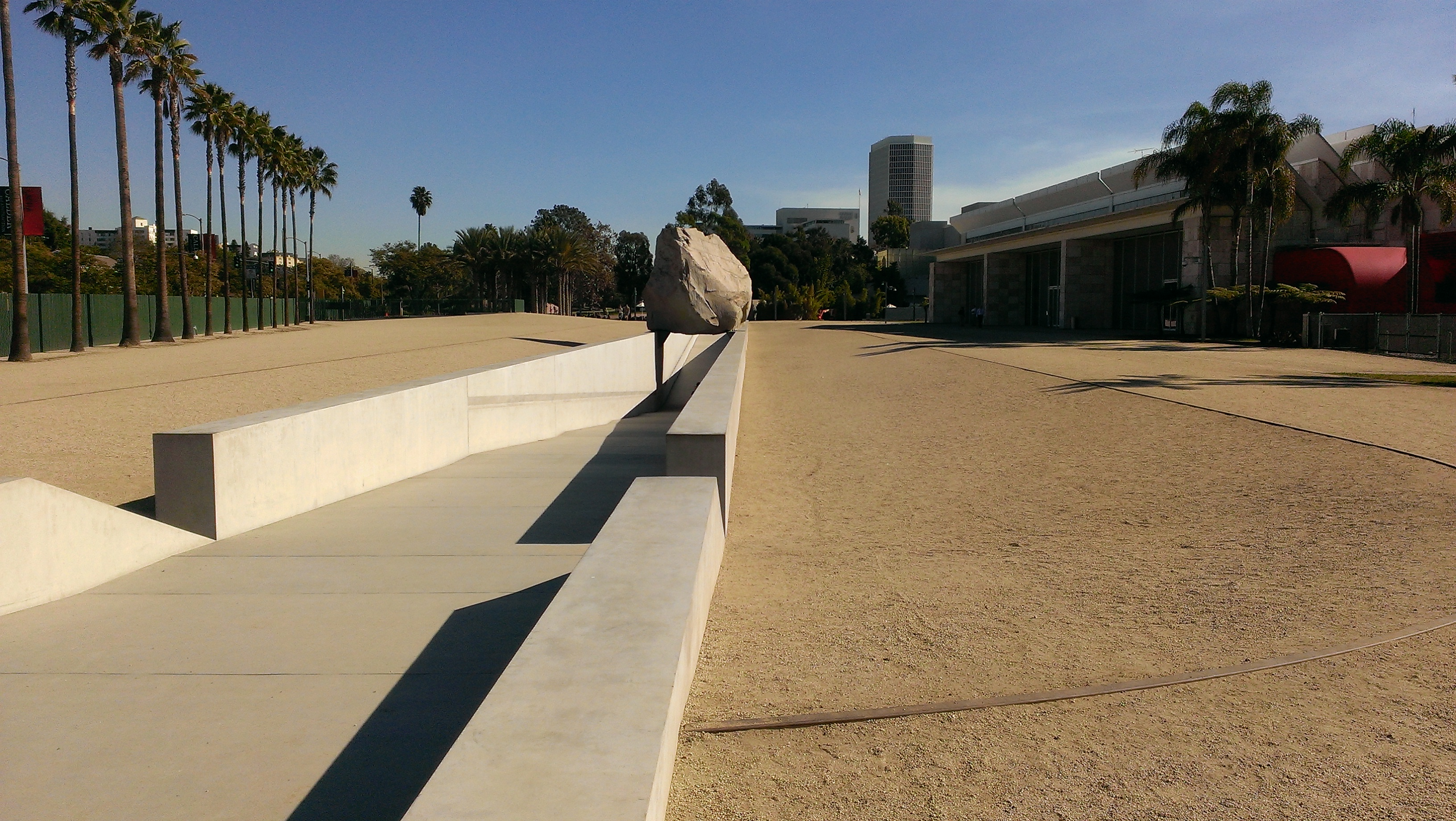
Michael Heizer, Levitated Mass, 2012

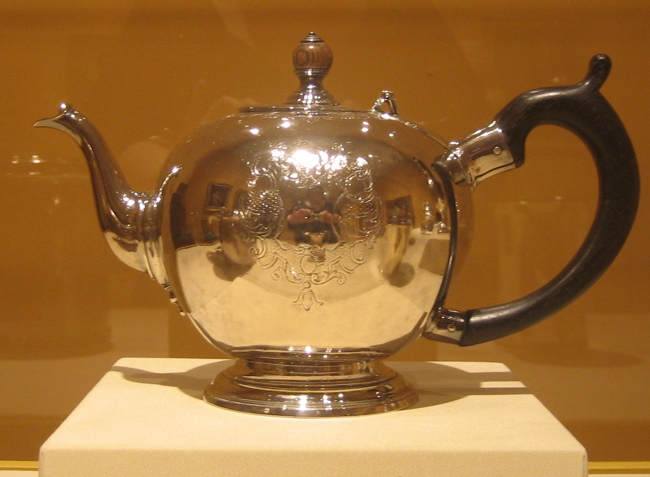
Silver teapot made by colonial silversmith Jacob Hurd, ca 1730

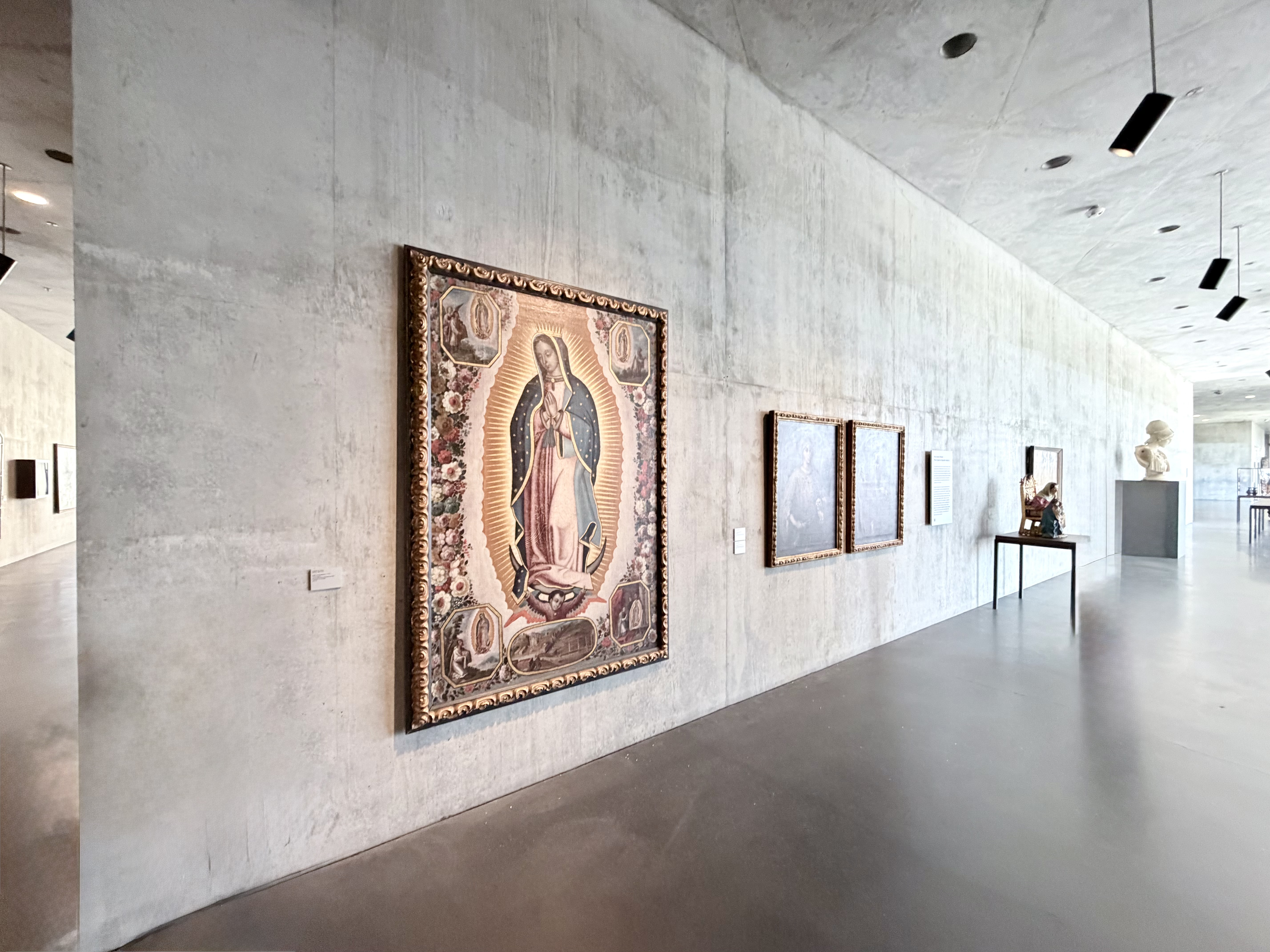
Antonio de Arellano, Manuel de Arellano, Virgin of Guadalupe (Virgen de Guadalupe), 1691, oil on canvas in the new Geffen Gallery, 2026.

== See also ==
- La Brea Tar Pits and George C. Page Paleontology Museum, next door to Los Angeles County Museum of Art
