= Strictly Confidential (2024 film) =

British thriller film

- Theatrical release poster
- Directed by: Damian Hurley
- Written by: Damian Hurley
- Produced by: Elizabeth Hurley; Philippe Martinez
- Starring: Elizabeth Hurley; Georgia Lock; Lauren McQueen; Freddie Thorp; Genevieve Gaunt; Max Parker
- Cinematography: George Burt
- Edited by: Frederic Fournier
- Music by: Michael Richard Plowman
- Production company: MSR Media
- Distributed by: 101 Films
- Release date: 5 April 2024
- Running time: 88 minutes
- Country: United Kingdom
- Language: English

Strictly Confidential is a 2024 British thriller film written and directed by Damian Hurley in his directorial debut and starring his mother Elizabeth Hurley, Georgia Lock, Lauren McQueen, Freddie Thorp, Genevieve Gaunt, Pear Chiravara, Llyrio Boateng, and Max Parker. The film was released in the United States on 5 April 2024 to generally negative critic reviews.

== Plot ==
Rebecca's mother informs Rebecca's sister, Jemma, that Rebecca's friends are visiting Rebecca's house to get closure and move on from Rebecca's death. Mia meets Natasha who works as an erotic dancer at a club.

Mia, Will, James and Natasha arrive at Rebecca's house. It is revealed that Jemma and Rebecca's boyfriend, Will, had an affair. It is revealed that Rebecca's mother and Natasha had an affair. Rebecca's mother and Natasha get intimate. Mia and James are ex-lovers. Mia meets Sebastian and talks out Rebecca's father, Thomas Lowell's death and Rebecca's death. Rebecca's mother and Natasha get intimate. Mia meets Amalia and Amalia's mother, Catherine Issac who is a psychotherapist. With Amalia's help, Mia Faber finds a file with her name. After reading the file, Mia understands that Rebecca used Mia's name while visiting Catherine for therapy and Rebecca was pregnant. Mia talks to Jemma about Thomas's death. James and Mia get intimate. Mia explains everything to James. Mia and Natasha see Will and Jemma together. Mia finds Rebecca's chain in Sebastian's house. Mia sees Rebecca's mother, Lily and Natasha together. Mia confronts Lily in a church about Thomas's death and Lily explains everything. Rebecca is revealed to be alive.

In a flashback, it is revealed that Rebecca named her unborn child as Mia and James is the child's father. James tries to kill Rebecca when Rebecca wants to tell everything to Mia Faber.

At present, Rebecca wants to inform the police but James threatens to kill Rebecca. Lily pushes herself and James off a cliff to save Rebecca. James is dead. It is revealed that Sebastian found Rebecca after James tried to kill Rebecca. Lily is alive but injured. Rebecca forgives Jemma and Will. Rebecca and Jemma forgive Lily but Mia Faber is unable to forgive Rebecca and Sebastian. While leaving, Mia Faber sees Rebecca holding a child.

== Cast ==
- Elizabeth Hurley as Lily
- Georgia Lock as Mia
- Lauren McQueen as Rebecca
- Freddie Thorp as James
- Genevieve Gaunt as Jemma
- Pear Chiravara as Natasha
- Llyrio Boateng as Sebastian
- Max Parker as Will

== Production ==
MSR Media produced the film. Production for the film began in late 2022 in Saint Kitts and Nevis and ended in December that year. On 28 February 2024 Lionsgate released the trailer for Strictly Confidential.

== Reception ==
=== Release ===
Strictly Confidential was released in the United States on 5 April 2024, with a limited theatrical release and on Prime Video, Apple TV, Google Play, YouTube and Fandango at Home.

=== Critical response ===
On aggregate review site Rotten Tomatoes, the film has an 10% approval rating based on five critical reviews. According to a review by Mike McGranaghan of Aisle Seat; "Strictly Confidential has a screenplay that sounds like it was written by an AI program that was taught every cheesy, straight-to-cable erotic thriller from the early '90s." Avi Offer of NYC Movie Guru states; "A clunky, convoluted and preposterous mess with enough unintentional laughs to make it a guilty pleasure. Strictly Confidential is like an erotic version of Knives Out without the comedy, suspense or Benoit Blanc." Stephen Holland of Screen Rant; "First-time director Damian Hurley delivers a disappointing erotic thriller full of predictable twists, an illogical plot, and stilted scenes." Brian Orndorf of Blu-ray.com; "Hurley doesn't push the picture's sauciness and he's mostly fatigued when it comes to blowing minds, but Strictly Confidential does have the novelty of a son exploiting the sex appeal of his mom for the benefit of an otherwise uninteresting whodunit."
