= Bart Lytton =

American businessman

- Born: Bernard Shulman; October 4, 1912; New Castle, Pennsylvania
- Died: June 29, 1969 (aged 56); California, United States
- Education: University of Virginia
- Occupation: Financier
- Known for: Savings-and-loan magnate, art collector, and founder of both the Los Angeles County Museum of Art and a vanity museum
- Spouse: Beth Lytton

Bart Lytton (born Bernard Shulman, October 4, 1912 – June 29, 1969) was an American business executive, Democratic Party fundraiser, writer, public relations executive and philanthropist. He was a founder of Lytton Financial Corporation, one of the five largest savings and loans in the United States with $700 million in assets.

Lytton was known for his flair and showmanship, and once said, "the only ism for me is narcissism".

== Early life ==
Lytton was born in New Castle, Pennsylvania, the son of a lawyer who was murdered when Bart was three years old by a merchant who was enraged when the lawyer sought to enforce seizure of his business to satisfy a court judgment. The merchant was subsequently convicted of manslaughter.

Lytton attended Westminster College and the University of Virginia, and then worked for the Works Progress Administration in New York as a theater director.

== Career ==
Lytton moved to California in 1939 and became a screenwriter and public relations executive, briefly joining the Communist Party. He worked for a time as a magazine writer and radio script writer, writing for radio programs that included Gang Busters, A Date With Judy and Sky Blazers.

Among his screenplays was the script for a "potboiler melodrama" called Tomorrow We Live, a 1942 Poverty Row film directed by Edgar G. Ulmer. Lytton also wrote the story for Hitler's Madman (1943), another low-budget film.

In 1948 he began to handle public relations for the Coast Federal Savings and Loan Association, and after that he became a mortgage broker. He was successful at that, and in eight years had earned enough money to take over the Canoga Park Savings and Loan Association. He then bought Home Foundation Savings of Palo Alto and in 1959 created Lytton Financial Corporation, with two branches in Los Angeles. It became one of the five largest savings and loans in the United States with $700 million in assets.

Lytton's company thrived on the booming California housing market, which he helped to finance, and his success was largely based on his showmanship. He "dazzled customers with free gifts, book fairs, art auctions, coffee and cake."

Lytton Financial suffered from the collapse of the California housing boom in the mid-1960s. The company found itself overextended, and its stock price plummeted. In 1968, Lytton was forced to resign. After his departure, the company was reorganized as LFC Financial Corporation.

== Political involvement ==
In 1953, he testified before the House Committee on Un-American Activities about his Communist experiences in New York and Hollywood. In his testimony, Lytton named Hollywood figures he said had attended Communist Party meetings, among them John Howard Lawson and Stanley Prager.

By 1958, he became active in Democratic politics through a connection with Jesse Unruh, the "boss" of the California State Assembly.

A lavish political contributor, Lytton served as Finance Chairman of the California Democratic Party from 1958 to 1962, during the first administration of Governor Pat Brown, and was a major donor to the presidential campaign of President John F. Kennedy.

Lytton gave $200,000 to the Kennedy 1960 presidential election campaign, and before his resignation from Lytton Financial he gave $30,000 to $40,000 a year to various Democratic election campaigns.

== Philanthropy ==
Together with Howard F. Ahmanson, Sr. (the prominent Republican who had reportedly introduced him to Unruh), and Anna Bing Arnold, Lytton was first a principal patron of the Los Angeles County Museum of Art, the largest art museum west of the Mississippi when it opened in 1965. Lytton later withdrew his promised support in disagreement with Museum planners, and a Museum gallery named for him was eventually renamed in honor of oil magnate Armand Hammer. Lytton retaliated by creating his own "Lytton Center for the Visual Arts" in one of his bank buildings, which also housed an invaluable European collection he had purchased for a future Hollywood Film Museum, another of his pet projects that was stillborn.

A public park he originally built for art displays near one of his office buildings in the city of Palo Alto still bears his name.

== Death ==
Lytton died of a heart ailment in Los Angeles on June 29, 1969. He was survived by his wife, his mother, and a daughter.

== Additional sources ==
- New Castle (Pennsylvania) News, June 22, 1965 and June 30, 1969 (obituary)
- Who Was Who in America, Volume V, 1969–73
- Bart Lytton, Oral History, John F. Kennedy Presidential Library, 1966
