= Tomorrow We Live =

Tomorrow We Live may refer to:

- Tomorrow We Live (1936 film), a British drama film directed by H. Manning Haynes
- Tomorrow We Live (1942 film), an American film directed by Edgar G. Ulmer
- Tomorrow We Live (1943 film), a British film directed by George King
- Tomorrow We Live (album), a 2015 Christian hip hop studio album by KB
