= Carl Langbehn =

German resistance member (1901–1944)

Carl Langbehn (6 December 1901 – 12 October 1944) was a German lawyer and member of the resistance to Nazism.

He was born in Padang, Dutch East Indies. During the Weimar Republic, he was a member of the German People's Party. In 1933, he joined the Nazi Party, but during the 1930s he began to grow increasingly critical of the regime. He was an acquaintance of Heinrich Himmler as their daughters attended the same school. By 1943, he was aware that Himmler was interested in the idea of negotiating peace behind Adolf Hitler's back. He introduced him to Johannes Popitz who suggested a coup d'état as the war was lost, but Himmler was not interested.

Langbehn was also a friend and adviser to Christabel Bielenberg and her husband Peter. In September 1943, he travelled to Switzerland and met with Allen Welsh Dulles of the Office of Strategic Services to determine the intention of the Allies and learnt that they wanted an unconditional surrender from Germany.

Upon his return, he was arrested by the Gestapo, tried by the People's Court, sentenced to death by Roland Freisler, and hanged at Plötzensee Prison.

== Media portrayals ==
- Sam Kelly portrayed Langbehn in the 1988 four-part British television drama Christabel.
