= Christabel (TV series) =

1988 BBC television drama directed by Adrian Shergold

- Genre: Drama
- Based on: The Past Is Myself by Christabel Bielenberg
- Written by: Dennis Potter
- Directed by: Adrian Shergold
- Starring: Elizabeth Hurley; Stephen Dillane; Nigel Le Vaillant; Geoffrey Palmer; Ann Bell; Ralph Brown
- Composer: Stanley Myers
- Country of origin: United Kingdom
- Original language: English
- No. of episodes: 4

Production
- Producer: Kenith Trodd
- Cinematography: Remi Adefarasin
- Editor: Clare Douglas
- Running time: 60 minutes

Original release
- Network: BBC2
- Release: 16 November – 7 December 1988

Christabel is a four-part British drama series first shown on BBC2 between 16 November and 7 December 1988.

It is based on the memoirs of Christabel Bielenberg, an English woman married to a German lawyer during World War II. Her book, The Past is Myself depicted life in Germany during 1932 - 1945. The screenplay was written by Dennis Potter, and was directed by Adrian Shergold. Each episode runs around 65 minutes. It stars Elizabeth Hurley in one of her earliest leading roles.

Part of the series was filmed at the disused Camperdown Works jute mill complex in Dundee, which doubled for 1940s Berlin. Other scenes were filmed in Hungary and Austria.

== Synopsis ==
An Englishwoman's love for a German lawyer is at the heart of one of the most extraordinary stories of the Second World War. Christabel Burton's aspiration of living in harmony with her husband Peter Bielenberg is shattered when Germany slips into the full horror of the Nazi regime and war is declared. Life for Christabel and Peter becomes a fight to survive, a struggle to hold on to human decency.

In the first episode, as wedding bells peal out across the English countryside, the bride's father is begging her to change her mind. The village congregation is shocked when the bridegroom responds in German. But Christabel insists on making an "impossible decision" – a commitment to married life in a country soon to be at war with her own.

== Cast ==
Actor	Role
Elizabeth Hurley	Christabel Bielenberg
Stephen Dillane	Peter Bielenberg
Geoffrey Palmer	Mr Burton
Ann Bell	Mrs Burton
Nigel Le Vaillant	Adam von Trott zu Solz
Sam Kelly	Carl Langbehn

== Home media ==
A VHS of the series, running 148 minutes, was released in the US by CBS/Fox Video in 1989.

A DVD containing a shortened 2-hour version was released by Guillotine Films in 2004.
