= Lily Drinkwell =

Fictional character from Hollyoaks

- Hollyoaks character
- Portrayed by: Lauren McQueen
- Duration: 2017–19
- First appearance: 6 January 2017
- Last appearance: 11 April 2019
- Introduced by: Bryan Kirkwood
In-universe information
- Other names: Lily McQueen
- Occupation: Student; Trainee nurse
- Mother: Babs Drinkwell
- Husband: Prince McQueen (2018–19)
- Aunts: Diane Hutchinson; Lynette Drinkwell
- First cousins: Scott Drinkwell (adoptive); Sinead O'Connor (step); Finn O'Connor (step); Rose Lomax; Anthony Hutchinson; Dee Dee Hutchinson (adoptive)

Lily Drinkwell (also McQueen) is a fictional character from the British soap opera Hollyoaks, played by Lauren McQueen. She made her first appearance on 6 January 2017. McQueen had previously appeared in the soap opera as an extra and was happy to be cast as Lily, who was characterised as being feisty, studious and close to her family. Lily was introduced as the niece of established character Diane Hutchinson (Alex Fletcher), and Lily's initial storyline saw her moving in with Diane and her family following the death of Lily's mother. Lily also becomes a love interest of established character Prince McQueen (Malique Thompson-Dwyer). Lily was then central to a dramatic stunt when she and other characters are involved in a car crash, which leaves Lily with scarring and deeply affects Lily's confidence. This and other factors cause Lily to begin self-harming, a storyline which was used to raise awareness and create conversation about the issue. Hollyoaks worked with four charities - The Mix, Mind, NSPCC and Samaritans - during the storyline. Lily continues hurting herself for months, and the character was central to a special episode focusing on several characters' attitudes towards self-harm. Following the episode, the storyline takes a darker turn when Lily begins self-harming with her friends Peri Lomax (Ruby O'Donnell) and Yasmine Maalik (Haiesha Mistry). Hollyoaks executive producer Bryan Kirkwood decided to explore the issue of group self-harm when he discovered that it was on the rise but not being talked about.

The girls' self-harm is found out and after briefly being hospitalised with sepsis, Lily receives help for her mental health. Lily and Prince's relationship is challenged when Prince has sex with Peri and is believed to have impregnated her, but it is later revealed that Peri is not pregnant and Lily forgives him. Lily and Prince end up getting married, but the marriage is almost sabotaged members of their families due to their opposition to the teenagers marrying. Shortly after their wedding, the couple face several issues, including a pregnancy scare and arguments over their future. Their relationship is further complicated by the arrival of Romeo Quinn (Owen Warner), who pursues Lily romantically. Lily initially is not interested but she gives into her feelings after almost dying in a storm and cheats on Prince with Romeo. McQueen explained that Lily has a connection with Romeo and keeps being attracted to him despite knowing that it is wrong to cheat on her husband. Romeo then hides Prince's testicular cancer diagnosis from Lily and she almost leaves with him; however, Prince ends up leaving the village instead, which was done due to Thompson-Dwyer's break from the soap to star in I'm a Celebrity...Get Me Out of Here!. In his absence, Lily ends up relapsing in her self-harm and begins a relationship with Romeo. Upon Prince's return, she is stuck in a love triangle and decides to pick Romeo.

In March 2019, it was announced that McQueen would be departing the soap in order to pursue other acting opportunities and that Lily would be killed off. In the storyline, Lily's mental health worsens and she relapses in her self-harm, which leads to her dying from sepsis. Hollyoaks chose to have Lily die from self-harm as they had portrayed several other mental health storylines that had had happy endings on the soap and they felt that they needed to show that it was not always the case. McQueen's final episode as Lily aired on 11 April 2019, which featured flashbacks of Lily's childhood and her death. Just prior to her death, Lily had run away with Romeo but ultimately realised that she saw her future with Prince. McQueen was in tears when she read her final episodes but she hoped that the storyline would increase awareness of sepsis to viewers and encourage viewers to talk about their feelings. Lily was very well received by critics and viewers. Lily's mental health and self-harm storyline was praised by viewers, charities and critics, although some viewers criticised the group self-harm plot. Lily's relationship with Prince was also well received and the pair were referred to by the portmanteau "Prily". Lily's death was also praised by critics. McQueen won and been nominated for several awards for her portrayal of Lily, as has her pairing with Prince and the 2017 self-harm episode.

== Casting and characterisation ==
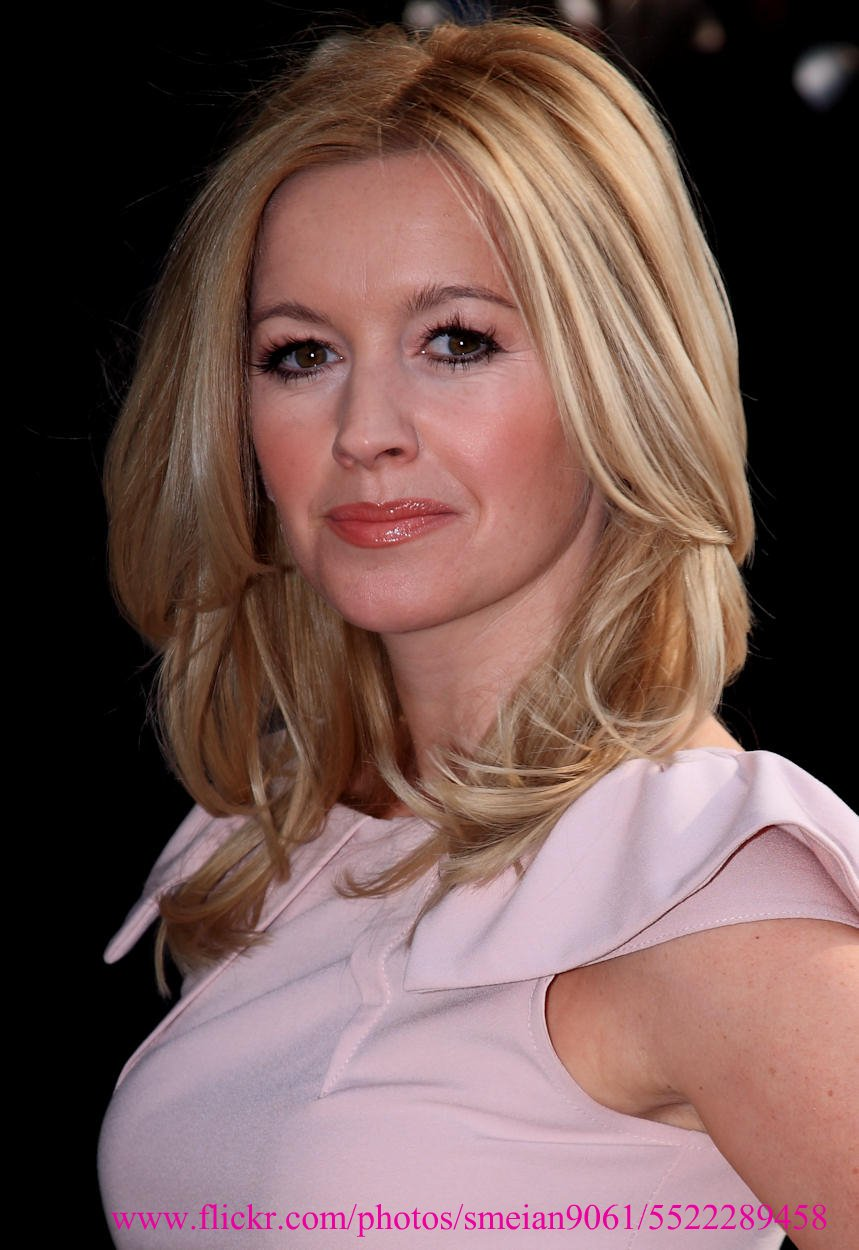
Lily was introduced as the niece of Diane Hutchinson, played by Alex Fletcher (pictured)

On 12 December 2016, it was announced that Diane Hutchinson (Alex Fletcher) would be returning to Hollyoaks in January 2017, hav taken maternity leave earlier in 2016, and that Diane would be bringing her niece, Lily Drinkwell, with her. Ten days later, it was announced that Lauren McQueen had joined the soap as Lily, a new regular character. Lily was described as a "schoolgirl who's dedicated to her studies but just as feisty as her family members". In a behind-the-scenes video released by Hollyoaks on the same day, McQueen said that "Lily might look like the typical kind-hearted, butter-wouldn't-melt young teen, but she's actually one serious tough cookie. She's fiercely independent and something of a mini-superhero to the less popular kids at school." McQueen added that Lily outsmarts the bullies at her school and that whilst she would not expect her character to do "anything outrageous" because of how she looks, McQueen was hoping for "some surprises".

Both McQueen and Daniel Kilkelly from Digital Spy joked that McQueen's surname may make things "confusing" due it also being the surname of one of Hollyoaks' families. The actress' favourite character was Mercedes McQueen, and she commented that the character's portrayer, Jennifer Metcalfe, was "really nice". McQueen also revealed that Lily "adores" Diane and "admires" her for raising two children by herself, and commented that Lily has "definitely inherited Diane's sense of fun and mischievousness". McQueen also revealed that Lily is particularly close to her cousin, Scott Drinkwell (Ross Adams), and that Lily finds Scott "absolutely hilarious". Speaking of the character's backstory, McQueen revealed that Lily's terminally mother, Babs Drinkwell, has recently died, and that Lily had to "grow up before her time" due to being Bab's carer. McQueen used to come to Hollyoaks as an extra, which was the start of her acting career, and she was happy to return to the soap as a regular actor and have a new experience. McQueen was a big fan of the soap and had watched it since she was 12-years-old. The actress also said, "I was over the moon when I found out I was joining the cast of Hollyoaks. Being from Liverpool I feel so lucky to be working in my home town and being part of such a successful show with cast I've looked up to since I was 12. I couldn't have been cast in a better family!" McQueen added that she hoped that Lily would do something "gritty" that "you wouldn't expect Lily to do".

== Development ==
=== Introduction and car crash ===
McQueen made her first appearance as Lily in the episode airing on 6 January 2017, when Diane returns to the village and brings Lily to stay with her family. McQueen said that she was "thrown in the deep end" in her first scenes and she had to make herself cry due to it being after the funeral of Lily's mother. Upon Lily's arrival, Diane's husband, Tony Hutchinson (Nick Pickard), is unsure about Lily staying with them, and is forced to apologise to her when she overhears him telling Diane that and he tries to convince her to stay. McQueen has said that Lily gets on well with Tony, and teased that due to Tony and Diane taking her in, Lily is able to start a "brand new life in Hollyoaks". McQueen said that she was glad to be part of Tony and Diane's family, and revealed that Tony is initially worried about how they will look after a teenage girl. The actress said that getting to work with Pickard and Fletcher was her favourite thing about being in the soap, and she credited the pair for being so welcoming, calling them "absolutely amazing".

Upon Lily's first day at her new school, she catches the eye of Prince McQueen (Malique Thompson-Dwyer) and he rushes to her aid when she has some small issues settling in at the school, but she does not appear to be "too enamoured" with him. However, Prince later wins Lily over and they kiss. Lily and Prince's kiss had been shown in the Hollyoaks 2017 New Year trailer. McQueen had previously teased a romance between Lily and Prince; she said in her introduction video that whilst Lily may not be too interested in getting a boyfriend due to her focus on her studies, McQueen suggested that "maybe a move to Hollyoaks might bring out a different side to [Lily]. And instead of dissecting frogs, maybe she might end up kissing one to find her prince", shortly before Thompson-Dwyer appeared in the video. Thompson-Dwyer was the first colleague that McQueen met and the pair got on well; they did several workshops and a screentest before they began filming, which helped build a connection between the two actors. She commented that Thompson-Dwyer is as cheeky as the character he is portraying. McQueen added that the pair have fun together and that she does not take romantic scenes too seriously. Thompson-Dwyer has said that McQueen inspires her and that she always knows her lines; he joked that he felt awkward when he met McQueen's real boyfriend.

Lily and Prince's relationship develops but briefly faces issues when jealous Yasmine Maalik (Haiesha Mistry) lies about having had sex with Prince, which devastates Lily. In May 2017, Lily and Prince were two of several characters involved in a "horror" car crash. Hollyoaks had been teasing the stunt for months prior and they had first revealed it in their 2017 Spring Trailer, with Lily being revealed as one of the characters involved in early May. Nadine Mulkerrin, who portrays Cleo McQueen, another character involved in the stunt, said that the crash's "repercussions will continue for quite some time", saying that was "one of those brilliant Hollyoaks storylines where they do a stunt and all these connecting stories come together." In the storyline, Prince decides to take over the driving from a nervous Tom Cunningham (Ellis Hollins), despite not having a license, when Yasmine falls ill and needs to go to hospital. Prince then swerves the car to avoid hitting Cleo and Joel Dexter (Rory Douglas-Speed) on their motorcycle, which leads to the teenagers crashing into a pile of logs and though a gate. Lily was considered to be in particular danger as she was hit by one of the logs, which crashed through the car window. The stunt originally aired on a Friday, leaving viewers waiting over the weekend to find out if Lily and the other characters had survived.

Lily then faces further challenges when she fears that she will have permanent scarring due to the injuries that she sustained in the crash. Lily becomes increasingly anxious in the lead up to one of her appointments and is forced to attend alone due to her family taking care of Scott, who has attempted suicide, though Lily is not aware of this. Lily feels "lonely and distressed" following the appointment and does not confide in her friends over what the doctor told her, though Tom tries to reach out when he senses that something is not right. When Lily finds out about Scott's suicide attempt, she tries to support him, but she leaves her family "in the dark about her own turmoil". Whilst Prince is on holiday in Ibiza, he tries to get a tattoo with Lily's name on it, but the tattoo ends up saying "Lilo". Lily tells Prince that she wants to be a proper couple with him and they almost have sex but are caught by Diane, who throws Prince out. Lily tries to have sex with him again but Prince's father Shane Sweeney (Michael Salami) makes a comment about Lily's scar, which devastates her self-confidence. This leads to Lily trying to keep her distance from Prince; he tries to fight for their relationship and find out what is affecting Lily, but she refuses to open up and their relationship goes downhill. Prince then ends up having sex with Yasmine due to his issues with Lily, who becomes convinced that her wounds make her unattractive and led to Prince getting with Yasmine.

=== Self-harm and special episode ===
"Lily has always been the strong, fearless, independent girl who's never cared about 'imperfection'. But after the crash the viewers will see a side to her that is vulnerable and insecure. Lily has also been affected by the devastation of losing her mum, and Scott trying to take his own life. She feels that self-harming will help but viewers will instantly see how much she regrets what she's done."

— McQueen on Lily's self-harm (2017)

In July 2017, it was announced that Lily would be central to a storyline highlighting the issue of self-harm. Hollyoaks decided to run the storyline in order to educate parents and guardians and increase conversations about the topic, as well as to encourage young people to seek support; they also called the topic "relevant" for their "young audience". Producers worked with the mental health charities The Mix, Mind and Samaritans to devise the plot, as well as with the NSPCC. McQueen was grateful to work with the charities and for "been given such a challenging storyline", with the actress adding, "I hope I can bring awareness to people like Lily and to let them know that they aren't alone". The storyline was part of #DontFilterFeelings, a wider Hollyoaks mental health campaign. The Samaritan's media advisor Lorna Fraser, who worked with the cast and crew for the storyline, hoped that the storyline would encourage people to reach out and find other coping mechanisms. The soap had previously tackled the issue of self-harm in previous storyline, which Johnathon Hughes from Soaplife believed were portrayed well.

McQueen revealed that she had worked with researchers and charities before she was given the scripts for the storyline and she met with a woman who had self-harmed, which helped give the actress a "real insight" into what Lily was going through. McQueen described playing Lily as a "whirlwind", adding, "As an actress, it's been amazing to go on such an emotional journey and I hope the younger viewers can understand what Lily is going through". The storyline begins when Lily, who has been struggling with her "extremely low" self confidence, is humiliated after her love rival Yasmine, who is jealous of Prince deciding to be with Lily rather than her, opens a box of crickets down Lily's top, forcing her to reveal her scars. The "public humiliation" leads Lily "down a dark path" and is the "catalyst" for her self-harm, as she rushes home afterwards and locks herself in the bathroom, where she cuts herself for the first time. Hollyoaks producers revealed that Lily's first time self-harming would be "only the start of" Lily's mental health "battle". McQueen hoped that the storyline would make youngers realise how dangerous self-harm is. Diane becomes suspicious when she finds a towel with blood on it.

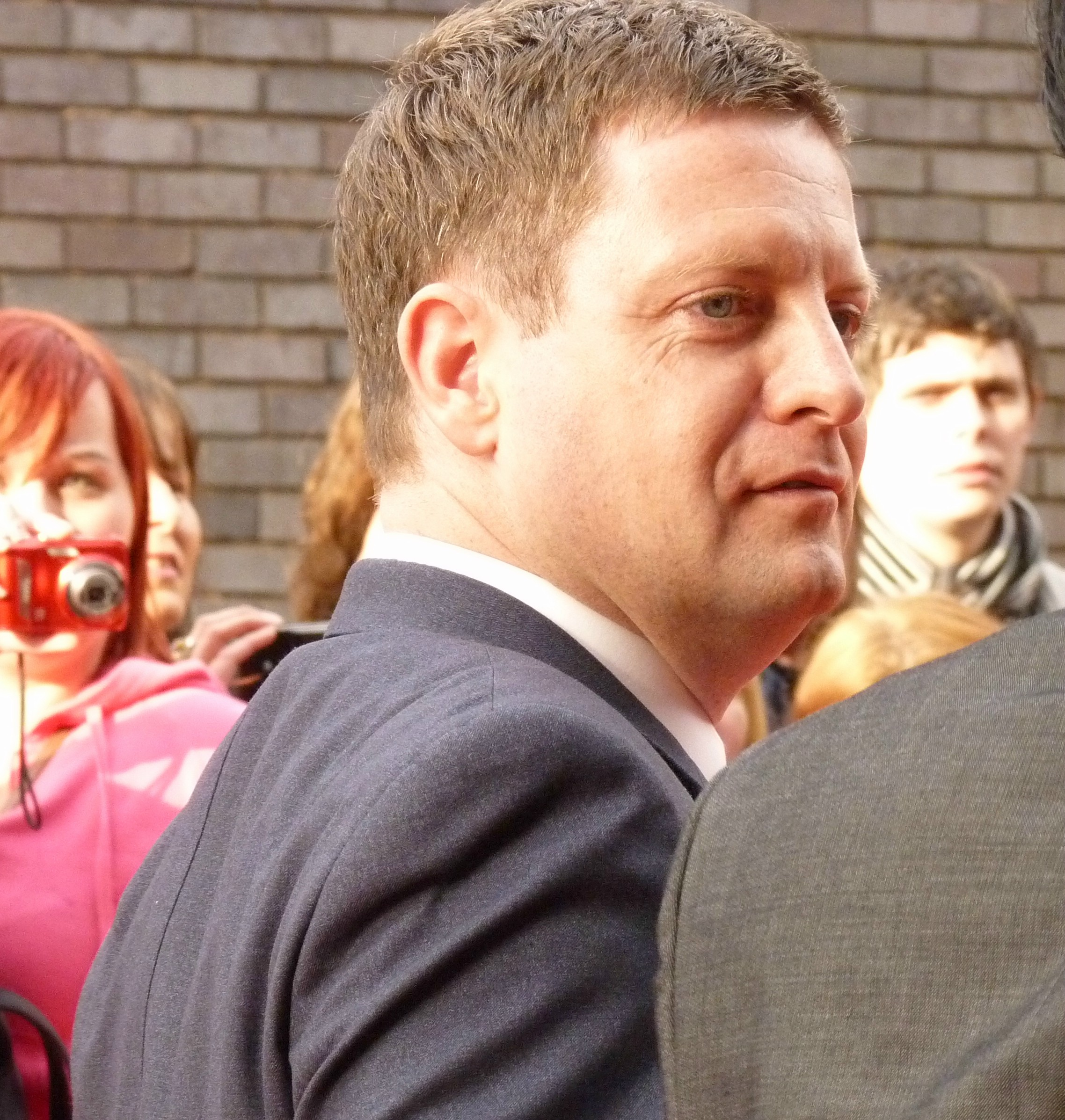
Executive producer Bryan Kirkwood learned that self-harm was on the rise in young people when developing Lily's storyline.

That October, following months of Lily continuing to secretly harm herself, it was announced that Lily would be central to a special episode focussing on her self harm. Yasmine and Peri Lomax (Ruby O'Donnell) were also announced to be involved, with the episode intending to offer an insight into the point of views of the three teenagers and their guardians Diane, Misbah Maalik (Harvey Virdi) and Leela Lomax (Kirsty-Leigh Porter), with some scenes in the episode being shown twice from different points of view in order to show the different perspectives of the characters towards self-harm. The episode was called "Three Mothers, Three Daughters". Prior to the episode's broadcast, Hollyoaks released a "moving" video recapping Lily's "sad" story in order to show the different sides of the character and to offer support to people in similar situations to Lily. The episode itself was also accompanied with on-air support signposting viewers to helplines. McQueen said that she found filming the episode challenging and a big responsibility but was glad that she was able to do it, calling it "powerful and emotional". She praised director Tracey Rooney and the crew for being supportive and said, "This episode is so important to show our viewers because it focuses on the different perspectives of a mother-daughter relationship and the reality of a struggling teenager. Our intention is to highlight the consequences that self-harm can have on a person's life and their family. We want to bring awareness and encourage people to talk about their struggles openly to family members or charities like The Samaritans and Mind".

In the episode's plot, Peri and Yasmine discover Lily's self-harm and plan to inform the rest of the school, believing that it is their duty, and they write an anonymous article about a girl who-self harms, which makes headteacher Sally St. Claire (Annie Wallace) suspicious that the subject of the article is one of the three teenagers. Sally calls the three girls' guardians in to raise her concerns, with all three women refusing to believe that their girl is self-harming, whilst Lily is terrified of what will happen if her self-harm is found out. The storyline then takes a "dark turn" as Lily's self-harm stays secret and brings the three teenagers together, as Peri later reveals that she harms herself too, which makes Lily feel that someone "finally understands her". In an unannounced twist, the three teenagers then make a "destructive pact" to continue self-harming in secret. Hollyoaks producer, Bryan Kirkwood, revealed that the group self-harming plot had been pitched by long-standing Hollyoaks writer Anna Clements, which led to the production team researching it and learning that the issue was on the rise among young people despite not being talked about. Kirkwood also revealed that things would get worse for the teenagers before getting better, and that some of their performances had made him cry as he found them so powerful. He added:

"We take our responsibility to our young audience very seriously. It's such a collaborative process on Hollyoaks... One crucial fact I was told was that people often want to present an image of perfection in an age of social media, so despite the fact that mental health issues among young people are reaching epidemic proportions, people are talking about it less. So we wanted to tackle the story and raise awareness. People can be really cynical about millennials having everything at their fingertips, but I think there is such a pressure on young people now and that's why some of them are turning to self-harm."

Speaking a 2017 press conference, Lorna Fraser from the Samaritans said that she condoned the storyline and was glad that the soap reached out to the organisation when they began developing the plot. Fraser said, "Clearly there are risks in covering topics like this, but there is a real need to raise awareness of issues like self-harming. We were really, really pleased that Hollyoaks were going to embrace such a challenging, sensitive storyline". She revealed that there was over a year of members of the charity speaking to the Hollyoaks team on the phone, reviewing scripts and revised scripts, and even going to the set to work together. Fraser said that the team would flag any issues that they would see in the scripts, particularly around the risk of encouraging self-harm, adding, "It's a really important topic to raise awareness and bring up for discussion, but what's also really important is to be aware of the risks of contagion". Fraser added, "Viewers have watched Lily struggle with bereavement, academic pressure, bullying, relationship issues and significant scarring following a traumatic car accident. Lily's story highlights the potential dangers of not dealing with difficult feelings and the importance of reaching out for help when we're struggling to cope. Viewers have seen the impact of this escalate for Lily". Mind said that they were glad that Hollyoaks was running the storyline and hoped that it would encourage viewers affected by the issue to get support. They explained people in England aged 16 to 24 were the most likely age group to self-harm compared with other age groups, and that more than 25 per cent of young women that age had self-harmed at some point in their lives, adding "It's a serious issue that is difficult to portray sensitively on screen, and we're glad that Hollyoaks is going about it in a responsible manner."

=== Support and proposal ===
Weeks after the special episode, Peri's family discover that she is self-harming, which leads to her revealing that Lily and Yasmine are also doing the same and exposing Lily's secret. Tony and Diane confront Lily about it and they are adamant that Lily needs to seek support for her mental health issues, but Lily appears to be in denial and claims that it is not a big deal. Prince also finds out Lily's secret, and after continuing to hurt herself, Lily later collapses. Diane at one point almost catches Lily about to self-harm, which occurs in the same episode where Prince asks Tony for permission to marry Lily, which Tony is unsure about. Prince had previously promised Lily that he would marry her during the explosion at their school. Tony eventually gives Prince his permission to propose, although Diane does not approve. Meanwhile, Lily has convinced Diane that she has stopped hurting herself and Lily's love ones are unaware that she is still self-harming. Lily is too scared to tell them the truth as she is worried they will be angry at her for deceiving them. Prince proposes to Lily in December 2017 in a pop-up casino and she says yes. However, Prince breaks up with Lily upon discovering that she is still hurting herself, and he ends up confiding in Peri and having sex with her. Prince later begs for Peri's forgiveness when she ends up in hospital after developing sepsis from her infected wounds. However, Prince does not tell Lily about his cheating with Peri upon their reconciliation, as Peri and Prince feel very guilty.

"We have the best teen gang we have possibly ever had [in Hollyoaks] in the lads Prince, Hunter, Tom and Alfie Nightingale and the three girls Lily, Yasmine and Peri. Not only is it a really diverse bunch, they all have really loud, brilliant and funny voices and I think we have struck gold with Prince and Lily. It's such an ancient reference but I think they're our Scott and Charlene – I love those kids and they MAY even get a happy ending!"

— Kirkwood on Prince and Lily's pairing (2017)

Prince tries to be a good boyfriend to Lily and attempts to support her on the anniversary of her mother's death, but Lily is tempted to self-harm again when he is late for their date on the day, so Diane tries to take her mind off him. Thompson-Dwyer believed that Lily and Prince's relationship would work out as they love each other. Thompson-Dwyer explained that Prince was not thinking when he had sex with Peri and that he was furious with Lily, but he regrets it a lot afterwards, with the actor saying that Prince had "let the emotions get the better of him". He also revealed that there would be big consequences because of this, explaining, "He has so much remorse – he begs for Lily back but she is just not having it. He ends up having to man up and be with another girl he doesn't even love. It's a big stepping stone for him but he has to make the right decision". Peri later pretends that she is pregnant to keep Lily and Prince apart and to continue living at the McQueen house and Prince stands by her despite being in love with Lily; when Peri sees Lily and Prince together, she fakes stomach cramps. However, Peri's fake pregnancy is later exposed.

Reflecting on Lily's first year, McQueen said, "I never expected all this drama, but I love it!" McQueen was also happy and shocked that she was nominated for two Inside Soap awards. The actress added that the self-harm storyline had been her biggest challenge and that she had spoken to a girl who self-harmed, which the actress found difficult but helpful. McQueen added that she had a lot of support and that she tried to "zone out and get into Lily's head space"; she also teased that the self-harm would be revisited and that Lily would continue to struggle mentally.

=== Marriage to Prince McQueen ===
Lily and Prince then decide to get back together and get married, which shocks other characters. The characters were confirmed to get married in February 2018 when the actors and Hollyoaks crew were pictured filming the wedding scenes on location in Liverpool, with the pictures showing Prince and Lily kissing and Lily in a white wedding dress. McQueen admitted that viewers had mixed reactions to the characters getting married, revealing, "Fans are really rooting for Lily and Prince – but some wonder why she is giving him another chance as he has messed things up so many times! But others just really want them to be together and for Lily to be happy – and Prince does make her happy". McQueen added, "They are young and it is crazy that they are getting married but she is so passionate about him and feels so strongly – so she thinks why wait – I might as well just go for it. She actually forced Diane to sign the forms – so she really wants it to happen!" Lily marrying prince meant that both the character and the actress now had their surnames as "McQueen". In the storyline, Lily proposes to Prince after Peri's lie is exposed and she convinces Diane to sign the wedding parental consent forms. However, Diane is strongly opposed to the wedding as she believes that it will result in Lily self-harming again and so she tries to do everything she can to stop the wedding going ahead. McQueen explained that Lily wants Diane to stop interfering but the actress believed that Diane is trying to do what she thinks is best for Lily as she is worried for her mental health, even if Lily does not see it that way. Prince's mother Goldie McQueen (Chelsee Healey) is also against the wedding and so Shane, Diane and Scott kidnap Prince during his Stag night and lock him in Shane's van in order to prevent him getting married. Tony appears to be the only adult supporting the wedding and he "couldn't be prouder of Lily", who is grateful for his support.

In her head Lily is hoping her wedding will be the best day of her life. After everything she went through with the self-harming and being rushed to hospital with the sepsis infection before Christmas, she's trying to avoid negativity in her life and focus on how passionate she and Prince are about each other.

— McQueen on Lily's attitude towards her wedding (2018)

At the wedding, Lily is excited for her future with Prince but the atmosphere at the wedding begins to get awkward as Prince does not appear and Prince's brother Hunter McQueen (Theo Graham) worries that Prince will not come. McQueen explained that when Lily arrives and sees the McQueen family acting strangely, she believes that Prince has stood her up as he does not want to marry her and she is "heartbroken", adding, "she thinks it's all over and she thought it was going to be the best day of her life" and that has turned into a "nightmare". McQueen also believed that Lily would be "heartbroken" and feel "betrayed" if she found out that Diane was involved in the attempted sabotage, adding that Lily had already warned Diane not to "come between them". Shane ends up talking pity on Prince and sets him free, so he races to the church and steals shoes and a suit that he finds on his way there. Prince eventually does make it to the wedding and Lily and Prince end up getting married. McQueen found filming the wedding "strange", explaining, "Obviously I have never worn a wedding dress before and having Nick Pickard walk me down the aisle at a McQueen wedding was just weird – I never thought I'd ever do that. It's Hollyoaks though – it's so exciting that you get to do these exciting scenes". McQueen revealed that Lily is "quite vintage" in her style and that her dress was 1950s styled and had a bit of an "Audrey Hepburn look about it". She also revealed that the dress was made by the Hollyoaks costume team especially for her and was happy to be wearing something "glam" on the set. The actress also said that whilst she wanted Lily to be happy, she enjoyed the "chaos" and challenges that the character has, explaining, "I wouldn't want it to be too easy for her – it's fun doing exciting things that shock the audience so hopefully there will be some surprises along the way".

Prince and Lily move into their own home and try to prove to everyone that they are not too young to be married but they face various issues and argue over several things, including money. Lily and Prince face further marital issues when Lily believes she may be pregnant but finds out from a pregnancy test that she is not. Prince gets carried away and pressures her to take another test but Lily does not want to as they cannot afford it, but Prince uses their food money to buy a new test and his family find out about the possible pregnancy. When Lily finds out that "all eyes are on her", she lashes out at Prince for causing a fuss and is "brutally honest" and tells Prince she does not want a baby with him, leaving Prince "[s]tung". Prince and Lily then have a disagreement about whether they are ready to have children and Lily makes a comment about Prince "only" being a window cleaner, which leads to Prince leaving their house as he believes that Lily thinks she is too good for him and is hurt that she does not want a child with him. Prince later becomes a bit worried about money when Lily tells him that she wants to quit her job in order to do unpaid work experience in a hospital. McQueen believed that Lily and Prince were too young to be married but thought they would overcome their struggles due to the pair being very in love and Prince making Lily really happy.

=== Romeo's introduction ===
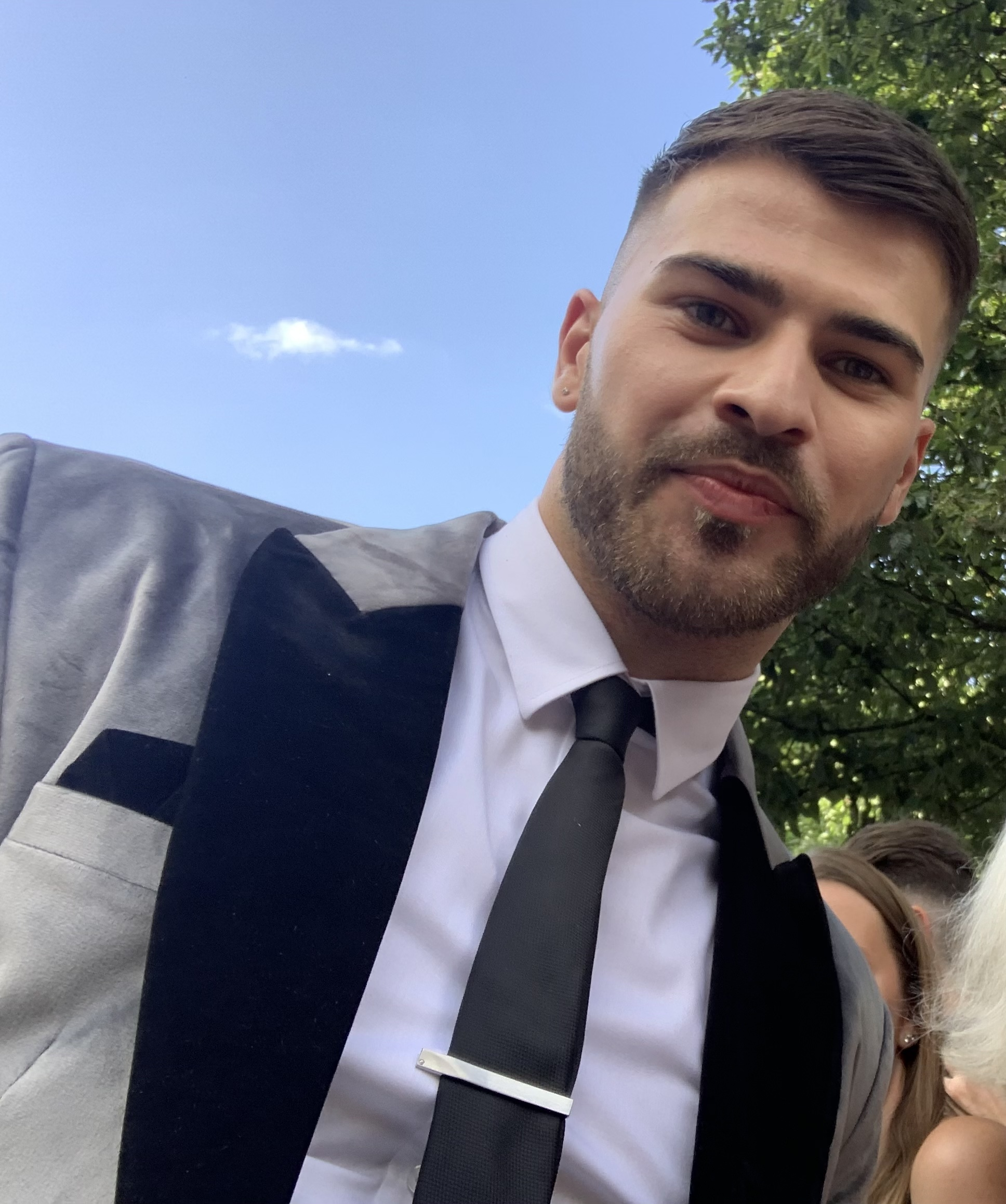
Owen Turner portrayed Romeo, Lily's love interest

Later in 2018, new character Romeo Quinn (Owen Warner) arrives in Hollyoaks village and becomes attracted to Lily. Romeo makes his feelings known and makes a "beeline" for Lily, trying to impress her with his "smooth-talking" and Shakespeare quotes, but Lily tells him she is not single. To Lily's surprise, this does not deter Romeo and he continues to pursue her, with Prince oblivious to this. Lily tries to get this out of her mind by having a honeymoon with her husband in the park. Romeo comes up with a plan to spend more time with Lily by convincing Prince to host another rave with his business proposition. Whilst they are preparing for the rave, Lily gets annoyed when Romeo flirts with her again and she cancels the boys' beer delivery as revenge when Romeo's flirting pushes her to "breaking point". Romeo later sees missed calls from Lily, who is in hospital, on Prince's phone, so he goes to see her himself in another attempt to cause trouble for the couple.

With Romeo needing a place to stay, he ends up living with Prince and Lily, and whilst Prince develops a friendship with Romeo, Lily does not. Lily subsequently develops an attraction to Romeo and tries to fight her "growing feelings", starting a love triangle between Lily, Prince and Romeo. McQueen explained, "Lily's head has been turned and poor Prince is oblivious to it all. It's good for the fans to see who she'll go for". McQueen hoped that Lily would be happy with Prince, adding, "She set eyes on him the very first time she arrived in the village. It's sad to see she might go with someone else". However, Thompson-Dwyer believed that Romeo and Lily seemed to "go together" as they had some traits that Prince does not have.

During a storm, Romeo tells Lily that he loves her and urges her to leave Prince, but Lily tries to remain firm in her decision to not betray her husband. Romeo then leaves and Lily follows him into the storm, where she has an "emotional showdown" with Romeo and they have an "emotional heart to heart" in the storm, but Lily then finds herself in a dangerous situation when the jetty she is standing on collapses and she falls into the pond. It was hinted that Lily and Prince could be victims of the storm due to this. The pair survives and Lily ends up kissing Romeo. Thompson-Dwyer believed that Lily cheating was a "twist" as Prince had been "really good" and not been the one to cheat in the relationship despite being assumed to be the "naughty, bad one"; he believed that Prince would be "heartbroken" if he lost Lily, adding, "It's Prily, isn't it?" The actor believed that Prince really loves Lily and "doesn't think she'd be the bad one ever", and teased that there could be a fight between Romeo and Prince if he found out as it would have a "bad effect on him". McQueen believed that some people may begin to turn on Lily following the kiss, saying, "people really invest in prily so they're going to be really shocked". The actress revealed that Lily is aware that it is wrong, explaining, "I think Lily will realise that she is in the wrong and it was a bit of a mistake. I think in the moment, [Romeo] had tried to rescue her and all of her emotions were everywhere. They do have this connection and have both had bad things to happen to them in their pasts – something keeps drawing her back to him". Lily then shares a few more kisses with Romeo.

Prince worries that he has Testicular cancer when he finds a lump and confides in Romeo, but he struggles to be honest with Lily. Lily notices that Prince is behaving strangely and is surprised when he forgets about her 18th birthday. Romeo puts his feelings for Lily "to one side" and tells Prince to celebrate Lily's birthday. When Lily tells Prince that she wants to take a five-year university course, Prince worries that he will not be around to support her. Lily continues to be unaware of Prince's health scare whilst Romeo knows about it, and Lily frets over her husband's behaviour. Lily then sees Prince punching his boss Louis Loveday (Karl Collins) in frustration after he fires him, leaving Lily horrified. Afterwards, Lily finds Romeo having a tense moment with James Nightingale (Gregory Finnegan) and she confronts James over the way she has been treating Romeo. Romeo is touched by her support and the pair vow to stop trying to please other people and they kiss passionately, with Lily unaware that Prince was about to open up to her about the cancer.

Prince finds out that his lump is cancerous but his operation is successful and he is cleared of cancer. Lily ends her fling with Romeo after learning about Prince's cancer, and she is horrified that Romeo had known about it. However, during the Hollyoaks hour-long Christmas special, Prince finds a flight ticket to Bangkok in Lily's name and questions whether she was planning on running off with someone else; a "heartbroken" Prince then tells Lily that he will stop holding her back and he leaves the village. However, Prince remains unaware that Lily was planning to leave with Romeo. Prince's temporary departure was written to facilitate Thompson-Dwyer's time off from the soap to participate in I'm a Celebrity...Get Me Out of Here!, with the actor confirming that he would return to Hollyoaks after his stint on the reality show. Thompson-Dwyer explained that Prince decided to leave everything behind when he found out that Lily was going to run away whilst he was unwell. He added that whilst Prince had an "inkling" that Lily is seeing someone else, he did not think it was his best friend. The actor believed that Lily was better suited to Prince as he makes her happy, despite Lily and Romeo having more in common.

=== Relapse and love triangle ===
During Prince's absence, Lily initially keeps her distance from Romeo but begins repairing her friendship with him; Romeo also plans a romantic gesture for Lily and "sparks fly" between the pair. Lily and Romeo then kiss and are spotted by a shocked Diane, who is very angry at Lily and is ashamed of her betraying Prince. Lily then relapses with her self-harm due to being devastated and hurt by Diane's "harsh words", and Lily is further distressed and upset when Diane ignores her the following morning. Lily has an emotional heart-to-heart with her cousin Sinead O'Connor (Stephanie Davis) about how she is feeling, but she continues to self-harm in secret. Lily then rejects Romeo again and tells him to not come near her anymore, with the "tense encounter" upsetting her. Sinead is concerned when she finds out that Lily is still self-harming and she tells Diane so that they can help her. Diane then makes a "major u-turn" and invites Romeo over in an attempt to reunite him with Lily as she believes that her niece needs all the support possible. Nana McQueen (Diane Langton) is unimpressed by Diane's scheme and tells her that Lily is the reason that Prince is not returning to the village. Regardless, Diane convinces Lily to go after Romeo and Lily opens up to her aunt about how she is feeling. Warner explained that Diane would always be a bit angry at Romeo as she does not want to think that it was Lily's cheating that made Prince leave; however, Warner called Romeo a "persistent guy" that would be willing to fight for Lily, especially now that Prince is gone and the "pathway is finally clear".

Lily begins to wonder about being with Romeo but remains confused by her feelings. She ends up receiving an offer from Newcastle University to study Medicine there but Romeo finds out that she is still self-harming. Diane tries to get Lily to talk about her issues with Farrah Maalik (Krupa Pattani) but she refuses. However, Lily gives Romeo her cutting kit and tries to stop when he "tearfully" admits that her self-harm reminds him of his mother's drug addiction, which Lily uses as a "wake up call". Lily and Romeo admit that they love each other and decide to begin a relationship; however, Prince then returns and attempts to rekindle his marriage. Thompson-Dwyer explained that Prince knows that Lily will be annoyed at him for leaving, but that he would be more shocked to find out about her being with Romeo.

A shocked Romeo hides the new relationship from Prince and the latter tries to celebrate his wedding anniversary with Lily, leaving Lily to make a "big decision" about who she wants to be with, and she considers getting back together with Prince. Lily is "plunged into turmoil" due to Prince's return. When Prince later finds out about Romeo and Lily's relationship, he has a "dramatic showdown" with his former best friend and Prince even punches Romeo. Thompson-Dwyer explained that Prince would be very angry and not think straight when he finds out, going "absolutely crazy" and running around "wildly". McQueen also revealed, "Prince is absolutely heartbroken when he finds out about the affair, especially because Romeo was once his best mate. He literally wants to kill him. You don't want to see Prince when he's angry". Discussing Prince's return, McQueen revealed that Lily is "frustrated and heartbroken" that Prince disappeared and that she wishes he had answered all of her calls "when she needed him the most". However, she added that Lily still loves Prince and does not want him to be hurt when he finds out about Romeo. McQueen revealed that Lily is struggling with Prince's return due to the fact that things are "on track" with Romeo, and she is "overwhelmed" by Prince's attempt to win her back. Regarding Lily's dilemma, McQueen opined, "I think that Romeo is the fantasy and Prince is the reality. Even though I'm a massive Prily fan, I think right now Romeo is the one who makes her the happiest and she has more of a connection with. They both love making each other smile by citing poetry and I feel like they both understand each other's dark thoughts".

=== Departure and death ===
In March 2019, it was reported that McQueen had left Hollyoaks to pursue other acting roles and that Lily's exit would air over the next few months. However, the departure was not yet confirmed by the soap itself. A source said, "Lauren is one of the show's biggest talents so it's a big loss but it's only natural she wants to spread her wings. It's not been an easy decision but it's the right one for her. Lily's exit is being kept under wraps but it's Hollyoaks so it's bound to be explosive and emotional". Later that month, the actors portraying the characters of Peri, Scott, Diane, Romeo and Sinead were photographed by paparazzi filming the funeral on location at a graveyard. Due to the rumours of McQueen's departure, Sophie Dainty from Digital Spy speculated that Lily could be the one to be killed-off, although she admitted that there could be other possibilities. Weeks later, it was confirmed that Lily would be killed-off in a "heartbreaking sepsis storyline" following Lily's self-harm relapse due to the fallout of her love triangle. McQueen confirmed that she had chosen to leave the role to pursue other acting roles and thanked Hollyoaks for the "amazing" experience. It was also reported that Lily's "harrowing" departure episode would also feature "interwoven" flashbacks of Lily's childhood with her deceased mother. In order to be accurate and sensitive, Hollyoaks worked with the charity UK Sepsis Trust for the storyline. Diane's portrayer Fletcher hoped that viewers would see the "seriousness" of how getting sepsis through self-harm can be catastrophic, adding, "I have felt affected by this storyline as we've all given it 100%. It's carried so much responsibility to get it right with the support of all the charities involved". McQueen felt honoured to be given the storyline that had to be carried responsibly, adding:

"Even though it was challenging and emotional I really hope I did it justice and hope it raises a lot of awareness to the audience. I hope the storyline makes the audience aware of how serious self-harm is, and that the consequences can be life threatening. Sepsis is actually very common, which many people may not know what the symptoms are, and it's something that needs to be treated very quickly. I hope it opens up a lot of conversations and encourages people to talk and get help if they relate to Lily."

Discussing why Lily was killed-off, Kirkwood explain that the soap had portrayed various mental health storylines over the years and that most characters had found happy endings and recovered, and the Hollyoaks team felt that they needed to show that this was not always the case and portray a different outcome, explaining, "we have to show authentic devastation as part of the aftermath while avoiding romanticising the reactions. We have to be extremely delicate so as not to trigger people into thinking that's how they'd want their family to feel. We have consulted charities and experts and survivors throughout this entire process". He added that Lily's mental health storyline was a "story about family, friendship and love and has spanned for 18 months – and I think it's one of the best we have ever done. Killing Lily off was of the scariest things to discuss but we eventually reached the decision that the character should die as a result of her sepsis through self harm. It's an incredibly difficult story to tell – to get it wrong is simply not an option." Kirkwood explained that the team had tried to ensure that Lily's self-harm storyline would remain "as authentic and real as possible" whilst not being harmful, which was why Lily's method of self-harm was never shown onscreen. He added, "There are limits to what we can do in the 6:30pm slot and compliance have been over these episodes again and again. What mattered most to us was the emotional truth for the characters and to be true to what they are going through so in the end the timeslot didn't matter". McQueen added that due to the soap's early timeslot, "while it is shocking for the audience we've ensured it's been researched and handled within the guidelines for the timeslot".

Scriptwriter Roanne Bardsley explained that whilst it was disappointing that McQueen wanted to leave the soap, it allowed the production team to explore this exit storyline for Lily which they would not have been able to do otherwise. He revealed, "It gave us the chance to be really brave with this storyline and take it to a really important place. We talked about it in story conference and we thought it would be the most fitting ending. Although people do recover from self-harm, it's also important to show how serious it can be, because that's hopefully the best deterrent for people watching. We're showing how badly it can go if you don't get the right help". Bardsley explained that he really wanted to emphasise "the loss of potential and the loss of a life that didn't need to end" and showing what Lily missed out on and who she could have by showing her ambitions, explaining, "I was really keen that it wasn't all about boys and romantic love. Instead it was about her ambitions as a person. Lily wanted to be a doctor, she wanted to travel the world and she'll never get to achieve those dreams because she wasn't able to get the help she needed for her mental health". He added that the flashbacks to Lily as a young child show her dreams that she will no longer be able to achieve due to various points in her life leading to making her struggle. The writer believed that some viewers would be angry and upset about this outcome for Lily and added that the storyline is "supposed to be confronting because self-harm is a distressing topic to tackle. It's a taboo issue and it's not something people are comfortable talking about, which is why we've done it". He believed that it would be uncomfortable viewing but hoped that it would "get the message across".

In the storyline, Lily finishes her project but she is horrified when she realises that has not done her presentation and suffers a breakdown, leading to her teacher Courtney (Amy Conachan) noticing her self-harm scars. Lily then admits herself to a mental health hospital as her health intensifies. When Romeo decides to go on the run due to being wanted for the murder of Mac Nightingale (David Easter), Lily decides to go with him and checks herself out of the mental health hospital. McQueen's final episode as Lily aired on 11 April 2019. The episode flashes between scenes of Lily going to the train station with Romeo and flashbacks of her childhood with Babs. The flashbacks featured a young Lily accidentally burning her hand and then Lily caring for her ill mother. In the present day, Romeo is then stunned when he finds out that Lily is still hurting herself and has to catch her when she almost faints. Meanwhile, Diane, Tony and Prince are told by the doctors that one of Lily's wounds has been infected and that she has sepsis, which is spreading to her internal organs, and they try to find her in a "a race against time" as her health deteriorates. Yasmine and Peri initially keep Lily's secret of running away but then are truthful when they realise how ill she is. Whilst talking about their future, Romeo confesses that he stole money from a restaurant, which leads Lily to admit that she sees her perfect life with Prince, not Romeo, and that she does not want to give up on her dreams. Romeo then leaves Lily so she can achieve her dreams, but she becomes more unwell and ends up stumbling into a bathroom before dying of sepsis; Tony, Diane and Prince find Lily dead on the floor.

McQueen explained that Lily is unaware that she has sepsis and thinks she has a cold; she hoped that the storyline would make viewers more aware of the symptoms, explaining, "It's a gradual thing throughout the episode. You see Lily getting worse and worse. But she just brushes it off and doesn't think anything of it". McQueen told Inside Soap that she was in tears when reading her final episodes, commenting that it was "such a huge storyline to go out on". McQueen hoped that she had done the "challenging and emotional" justice and believed that the storyline would show viewers that sepsis needs to be treated quickly and that it is a common and deadly illness. She added that whilst most people would have wanted a happy ending for the character, her death created a bigger impact and showed how self-harm could be life-threatening. Following the airing of the episode, McQueen posted a picture of herself crying on social media with the caption "Thanks so much everyone who watched tonight. Yes I am a mess!" McQueen added that Lily would always be in her heart and that she was happy to be part of the soap, praising it for tackling "challenging" storylines like sepsis and self-harm. The actress revealed that she had left the soap as she wanted to play different roles in her career and felt that it was the right time to exit, explaining, "I didn't want to fade into the background after the self-harm story. I'm happy they gave me such a big storyline to go out on it's been a real challenge". She added that she would continue watching Hollyoaks and would not act on another soap opera out of loyalty to Hollyoaks.

McQueen found it challenging to act out "gradual decline" and was nervous for her death scene as she wanted it to be "as real as possible"; she researched the symptoms and listened to her friend who had had sepsis twice and told her how it affects the body. Talking about Lily's final week, McQueen was glad that Lily got a dedicated episode but found it put "extra pressure", adding, "I'm very grateful, the whole week is focused on Lily and there are some extra special touches like being on location, the slow-motion shots at the start of each episode and (spoken word artist) Hussain Manawer's poetry being used that he wrote especially. It makes it really powerful". McQueen hoped that Lily's death would encourage viewers to talk to someone about their feelings, adding, "It's terrifying because you think no one will understand you, but it's really important to reach out to someone, whether they're from a charity, a family member or a friend, to know you're not alone". She also explained that Lily eventually realised just before her death that she imagines her future life with Prince and McQueen believed that he was the love of Lily's life, adding that Lily has made the wrong decision and "never gets to say goodbye to Prince which is even more heartbreaking. If she'd lived she would've tried to make it work with him. It's sad they never get that closure". However, she also believed that Lily did not regret her relationship with Romeo as he got her through difficult times and they had a connection, sharing "similar dark thoughts" and both being tormented and understanding what the other was going through. She added, "Even back to the storm when he talked about 'the darkness inside being beautiful,' no one had ever told her that before. Lily was intrigued by him."

It was reported that Lily's death would have "far reaching consequences" on the people around her and impact the actions of other characters. McQueen explained that Lily's loved ones would blame themselves and struggle a lot. Following her death, Diane struggles with her grief when rereading Lily's university personal statement and she feels guilty that Lily became unwell whilst living in the Hollyoaks village despite feeling better when she was previously in Wales, believing that her main stress came from Romeo and Prince. McQueen explained that Diane tried to help Lily and tried to "get her away from the village and the situation with Romeo and Prince but it didn't stop Lily self-harming". Sinead feels guilty and blames herself as she helped aid Lily's getaway when she was unaware that she was ill. Various of Lily's loved ones blame each other and themselves in the aftermath of the tragedy. Lily's funeral occurs in May 2019, and Prince remains devastated due to falsely believing that Lily chose Romeo over him.

== Storylines ==
Lily arrives to live with her aunt Diane O'Connor (Alex Fletcher) and her husband Tony Hutchinson (Nick Pickard) following the death of her mum, Babs Drinkwell (Samantha Mesagno). Tony is hesitant about Lily staying with them but changes his mind. Lily bonds with her cousin, Scott Drinkwell (Ross Adams), and meets Prince McQueen (Malique Thompson-Dwyer). On her first day of school, teacher Neeta Kaur (Amy Maghera) upsets Lily when she makes a comment about Lily's mother not being pleased about her not rereading Jane Eyre, not knowing that she died. Neeta apologises to Lily and they bond. Lily and Prince start dating but they face various obstacles, including Diane objecting to the relationship. Lily and Prince are involved in a car crash and Lily is scarred in the process. She blames Prince and her confidence begins to decrease. She plans to have sex with Prince but this is ruined when his father Shane Sweeney (Michael Salami) comments on Lily's scar. Lily then finds out that Prince has had sex with Yasmine Maalik (Haiesha Mistry). When Prince rejects Yasmine, she shoves bugs down Lily's shirt in public, leading to her accidentally revealing her scar. Lily has a breakdown at home and then self-harms.

Lily continues self-harming for months and Yasmine and Peri Lomax (Ruby O'Donnell) end up finding out when they try to take pictures of her. The pair write an article about the self-harm to win an internship, which leads to headteacher Sally St. Claire (Annie Wallace) calling in the guardians of Yasmine, Lily and Peri as she is concerned about the girls potentially self-harming. All three girls deny that they are the one harming themselves. Peri then reveals that she self-harms too and the three girls then begin to self-harm together. Yasmine is uncomfortable with this and threatens to tell their guardians. When Peri's aunt Tegan Lomax (Jessica Ellis) finds out that Peri is hurting herself, Peri reveals that Yasmine and Lily are doing it as well, leading to Prince and Diane finding out. Lily denies hurting herself but later passes out and is hospitalised with sepsis due to an infected wound. Lily then opens up over why she self-harms and she begins therapy.

Lily accepts when Prince proposes to her but they break up when she finds out that Prince had sex with Peri after he discovered that Lily was still hurting herself. Peri believes that she is pregnant but when she finds out that she is not, she continues to lie. When the truth is revealed, Lily and Prince get married despite opposition from their families. However, they begin to argue over bills and a pregnancy scare. Romeo Quinn (Owen Warner) arrives in town and tries to woo Lily, but she is not interested. However, she ends up kissing him several times despite being married to Prince. When Prince finds out that he has testicular cancer, Romeo uses the situation to drive Lily and Prince apart. Lily decides to leave with Romeo, but when she finds out the truth about Prince's cancer she stays by her husband's side and she is furious that Romeo kept it from her. Prince ends up leaving Lily when he finds out that she planned to leave him. Lily struggles with his departure and ends up relapsing in her self-harm when Diane tells her off for cheating on Prince. Eventually, Lily and Romeo begin a relationship.

When Prince returns, Lily struggles with the situation but remains with Romeo. However, her mental health continues to spiral and she continues to hurt herself. When Lily realises that she forgot to create a presentation for her Extended Project Qualification, she has a mental break down and she is admitted to hospital. Romeo then visits Lily and tells him that he is fleeing the village as he has been wrongly accused of the murder of his grandfather Mac Nightingale (David Easter) and Lily decides to flee with him. However, it is revealed that Lily has sepsis and Tony, Diane and Prince race to find her. At the train station, Lily realises that she sees her future with Prince and Romeo lets her leave so that she can achieve her dreams. However, she ends up collapsing in the bathroom and dies from sepsis, and Prince, Tony, Romeo and Diane find her dead body, leaving them all devastated.

== Reception ==
=== Accolades ===
For her role as Lily, McQueen was longlisted for "Best Newcomer" at the 2017 Inside Soap Awards, whilst she and Thompson-Dwyer were longlisted for "Best Partnership" as Lily and Prince. At the 2018 British Soap Awards, Lily's self-harm won "Best Storyline" whilst "Three Mothers, Three Daughters", the special episode focussing on Lily's self-harm, won "Best Episode"; McQueen was also shortlisted for "Best Newcomer". That same year, Lily and Prince came in third place, with 9.6% of the total votes, for "Best Soap Couple" at the 2018 Digital Spy Reader Awards. The following year, Lily's death won "Most Devastating Soap Death" at the 2019 Digital Spy Reader Awards with 30% of the votes. McQueen was also shortlisted for British Soap Award for Best Actress at the 2019 British Soap Awards. For the 2019 Inside Soap Awards, Lily's day was shortlisted for "Best Exit".

=== Critical reception ===
Following Lily's debut, Laura-Jayne Tyler from Inside Soap praised the character, writing "We love Hollyoaks' newcomer Lily. She's a charming, friendly, nice girl – so seems like a real innovation in the village!" After Lily's death, Tyler praised the soap for its "unflinching depiction" of the "dangers of self-harm", calling it "important work". Discussing Lily's first appearances, Daniel Kilkelly from Digital Spy called Lily "sweet-natured" and wrote, "She's only been in the village five minutes, but it looks like Lily Drinkwell is already impressing certain residents". Kilkelly also joked that Lily's romance with Prince could be confusing due to the actress and Prince's character sharing the same surname, and he opined that Prince "might have his work cut out" if he wanted a romance with Lily due to her initial reaction to his attempts. Kilkelly also called Lily "kind-hearted" and wondered whether she and Prince could be a "match made in heaven". Following the car crash that Lily was involved in, Kilkelly wrote that the stunt left him feeling "anxious" and that Lily was one of the characters that he was most worried about. In June 2017, Kilkelly named Lily as one of the eight "rising stars" in British soap operas, writing that whilst Lily initially had a "fairly subtle introduction", the actress was given a "a chance to shine" following the car crash and her subsequent scarring and self-esteem issues, praising the actress for handling the "tough scenes with great sensitivity" and praising McQueen for proving "what she can do". Kilkelly added that Lily had been slowly bedded into the "popular Hutchinson family and a new gang of teens" and speculated that Lily's on-off romance with Prince would lead to bigger drama. Kilkelly later called the group self-harm plot "tragic".

Prince and Lily's pairing was known as the portmanteau "Prily". Discussing Lily and Prince's wedding, Katy Brent from Entertainment Daily called Lily a "young blushing bride" and wrote that she could not "remember a wedding with as much opposition as the upcoming nuptials of Lily Drinkwell and Prince McQueen – and that’s saying something in Hollyoaks." Kilkelly from Digital Spy believed that Lily looked beautiful and blushing in her wedding dress and wrote that she and Prince had "defied the odds to be together". Kilkelly believed that Prince was devoted to Lily. Kilkelly's colleague Rianne Houghton believed that the wedding was "overshadowed" by Hunter's grief and mental health struggle, and she noted how "the course of true love never did run smooth", especially in soap operas. She also reported, "while there was a lot of love for the #PrilyWedding from viewers (as well as a healthy dose of scepticism, of course), many fans were more concerned for Prince's brother Hunter". Following the wedding, Sarah Ellis from Inside Soap questioned whether Prince would cheat again after being forgiven by Lily twice for cheating. Rianne Houghton from Digital Spy reported how viewers were "divided" over Lily and Prince's "latest break-up" in April 2018, with some viewers annoyed with the storyline and "fed up with yet more relationship drama" whilst others were "pleased to see Prince go it alone", and she added that some viewers had predicted that they would break up again. Houghton believed that the couple would get back together again and opined that Lily's comment about Prince being "only" a window cleaner was "off-hand". Simon Timblick from Inside Soap compared Prince and Lily to Romeo and Juliet due to their families not wanting the pair to get married. After Prince had sex with Peri whilst Lily was in hospital, Johnathon Hughes from Soaplife opined that Prince had been a bad boyfriend and opined that whilst he wanted Lily and Prince to have a happy ending, he believed that the odds were really "stacked against them" due to Prince's "betrayal" and predicted that Lily would relapse if she found out. Hughes had previously called Lily "sensitive" and hoped that someone would help her before it was "too late", opining that Diane was too busy to busy to notice. He also predicted that Lily would have a "rough ride" in her self-harm storyline. Hughes also believed that Lily was on a path of "self-destruction" and wondered if her harming could have "truly tragic consequences". Lily was also called "Tormented" and "sensitive" by Hughes, who was unsure if Lily and Prince getting married was a good idea.

Hollyoaks embarked on telling this story after we were informed by charities including The Samaritans, MIND and The NSPCC that this is a huge issue for young people that is not being talked about and we have worked closely alongside them on this long-running storyline in order to help raise awareness of self-harming and the dangers faced by sufferers. We have a long established history of tackling difficult and important issues that affect our audience in a sensitive, engaging and informative way and the episode was accompanied with both on and off-air support pointing viewers to appropriate helplines."

— A Hollyoaks spokesperson regarding the complaints of the special self-harm episode (2017)

In 2017, Duncan Lindsay from Metro wrote an article praising the "shocking and deeply moving" self-harm episode and how the soap tackled the subject, noting its importance and relevance. He praised McQueen's portrayal of Lily in the episode, opining that she is "nothing short of a revelation" in "portraying vulnerability and devastation in equal measure while managing to retain a sincere likeability". He also believed that the soap should be "commended" for starting a discussion about group self-harm due to the lack of knowledge around it. In 2019, Lindsay wrote an article for Metro explaining why Hollyoaks made the right decision in how Lily died from self-harm, which he called "one of those soap moments that will stay with viewers forever", and how the storyline affected him. He opined that the soap had a difficult task with the self-harm storyline due to the importance of not triggering viewers or romanticising self-harm and that the soap "bravely refused to take the easy option" when deciding Lily's exit storyline. He believed that Lily's storyline would trigger conversations and added, "in showing the mistakes made by Lily and those around us, they are helping us to see that we have the power to change ourselves and not make the same ones". He also believed that Lily had to be killed-off in order to create a discussion about self-harm, explaining, "The character's legacy will be felt far harder now and will change lives. It has already gone some ways to altering mine. Lily may be gone, but the issue, thanks to this devastating outcome, is far from forgotten."

Digital Spy's Sam Warner revealed that some viewers hated Romeo for breaking Prince and Lily up. After Romeo's first attempt to pursue Lily, Sophie Dainty from Digital Spy questioned whether Lily would be "tempted" to cheat on Prince. She also questioned whether Romeo's scheming would cause Lily and Prince to break up. Dainty added that Lily had begun to "crack under the pressure" after Romeo urged Lily to leave Prince and believed that Lily showed her true feelings for Romeo when she went to find him in the storm. She also called the love triangle between Lily, Prince and Romeo a "surprise". Dainty also felt sorry for Prince after Lily passionately kissed Romeo and believed that it was "pretty certain" that Lily and Romeo would take things further. Johnathon Hughes from Radio Times believed that the "emotional trauma" of choosing between Romeo and Prince would trigger Lily's self-harm; he also believed that someone would "definitely" get their "heart broken" in the storyline. Katie Baillie from Metro believed that Prince was foolish for believing that he could "pick up from where he left off" upon his return despite leaving Lily without giving her the chance to explain. Tess Lamacraft from What to Watch called Lily and Romeo's kiss in early 2019 "heart-felt".

Lindsay called Prince cheating on Lily with Peri a "colossal mistake" and asked Prince "what the hell are you doing!?". He believed that Prince and Lily would survive the relationship despite this "massive heartache" due to Kirkwood saying that he wanted the couple to have a happy ending, but also opined that the characters would really "have to work for it!" Following the wedding, opined that Lily and Prince had not had "wedded bliss" due to their marital issues and questioned whether Lily would be tempted to cheat after Romeo showed his interest in her. Later, Lindsay opined that Prince and Lily "only enjoyed wedded bliss for a matter of weeks" before Romeo "put a spanner in the works", and he believed that there would be an affair and an "explosive showdown" following Lily and Romeo's initial kiss after the storm. Lindsay also believed that the "devastating impact" on Lily and Prince's relationship would affect fans of the pairing due to being "very invested in the relationship". Lindsay's colleague, Lindsay Shaw, believed that Prince and Lily appeared to be "destined to be together" when they were married despite "coming to breaking point" after Prince's fling with Peri. Shaw also questioned whether Lily trying to rescue Romeo during the storm was a sign that she has feelings for him.

Dainty opined that Lily was involved in the soap's "most high profile storylines" and noted that her self-harm storyline was "unanimously well-received by critics". She also called the love triangle between Romeo, Lily and Prince "highly complicated". Katie Baillie from Metro called Lily's self-harm storyline "harrowing" and speculated that it could "spiral out of control". Justin Harp from Digital Spy believed that Lily's final episode was "groundbreaking", adding, "It was a tragic goodbye for such a beloved character. So many Hollyoaks fans felt the loss, while also thanking the show for spotlighting the issues of self-harm and sepsis". He reported how viewers praised the soap for tackling the topics and McQueen's acting on social media. A writer from Heart believed that "Lily's battle with self-harm" was a "key" storyline in the soap. The special episode focussing on Lily's self-harm was reshown in April 2020 as part of Hollyoaks Favourites. Digital Spy reported in 2017 how viewers were "split" over the episode, with some praising the episodes whilst other reacted negatively. The episode received 42 complaints overnight following its initial broadcast over its portrayal of self-harm and the group self-harm "twist", leading to Ofcom assessing the comments to decide whether or not to launch a formal investigation. Viewers had mixed reactions on social media. Rose Hill from the Daily Mirror called Lily's death "heartbreaking". Hughes also called Lily's final scenes "emotional" and "heartbreaking".
