= Anna Bing Arnold =

Anna Bing Arnold (died 2003, also known as Anna Kostant) was an American philanthropist, arts patron, and former Broadway actress who was one of the principal early benefactors of the Los Angeles County Museum of Art (LACMA). She contributed $1 million to the campaign to build LACMA's original Wilshire Boulevard campus and financed the museum's Bing Theater, named in memory of her first husband, New York real-estate developer Leo S. Bing.

Arnold joined LACMA's board in 1965 and became a longtime supporter of acquisitions across several departments. Museum staff later referred to her as "LACMA's angel" because of her willingness to finance works for which the museum lacked another donor. Her philanthropy also extended to universities, children's education, healthcare, public parks, and other cultural institutions in California.

== Early life and acting career ==
Arnold was born Anna Kostant in New York and grew up in a family of modest means. As a teenager, she worked in a box factory before beginning a career as an actress.

Before becoming known as a philanthropist, Arnold worked as a stage actress under the name Anna Kostant. Broadway records credit Kostant with appearances in six productions between 1926 and 1932, including Howdy, King, The Trial of Mary Dugan, Faust, Elmer Rice's Pulitzer Prize-winning Street Scene, and Counsellor-at-Law. In the original 1929 Broadway production of Street Scene, she played Shirley Kaplan, and in Counsellor-at-Law she appeared as Regina Gordon alongside Paul Muni.

Arnold married Leo S. Bing, a member of the Bing family associated with the New York real-estate firm Bing & Bing. They had a son, Peter Bing, who later became a physician, public-health official, Stanford University trustee, and philanthropist. The family eventually moved from New York to Southern California.

== Los Angeles County Museum of Art ==
Arnold became involved with the art collection at The Museum of History, Science, and Art that developed into LACMA before the museum opened its independent Wilshire Boulevard campus. In 1953 she donated a limestone Standing Male Figure from Cyprus, dating to approximately 700–600 BCE.

When supporters of the museum mounted a campaign to create a separate art museum in Hancock Park, Arnold was among its largest individual donors. Howard F. Ahmanson contributed $2 million, Arnold contributed $1 million, and the Lytton Foundation pledged $750,000. By the time LACMA's new campus opened in 1965, the campaign had raised approximately $12 million.

A major part of Arnold's contribution supported construction of the Leo S. Bing Center, whose 600-seat Bing Theater became one of the principal facilities on LACMA's original campus. The theater was named for Leo Bing, who had died before the museum was built. Arnold joined LACMA's board in 1965.

Arnold subsequently became an important source of acquisition funding. In 1966 she provided the money with which LACMA acquired five monumental ninth-century BCE Neo-Assyrian reliefs from the palace of King Ashurnasirpal II at Nimrud. The reliefs, which had been in England since the nineteenth century, became important works in the museum's ancient Near Eastern collection.

She was also a major patron of LACMA's Indian and Southeast Asian art department. Curator Pratapaditya Pal later recalled that Arnold's gifts allowed the museum to fill gaps in its holdings and acquire important sculptures, contributing to the development of what became one of the museum's strongest areas of collection.

Her acquisition support was not restricted to a single field. Over several decades, works acquired through her gifts entered LACMA's collections of ancient Near Eastern, Greek and Roman, European, Asian, African, and modern art. The Los Angeles Times described the Ahmanson Foundation and Arnold in 1985 as LACMA supporters who were "in for the long haul," contrasting their sustained support with collectors whose relationships with the museum had ended.

The Los Angeles Times later identified Arnold, together with Camilla Chandler Frost, as one of the women whose patronage was particularly important in building LACMA's collection during the institution's formative decades.

== Arts education ==
Arnold's relationship with LACMA continued after her death through a large bequest devoted to arts education outside the museum. LACMA later said that the gift was the largest endowment bequest the institution had received up to that time.

The endowment helped fund LACMA's educational work in Los Angeles public schools. In 2007 the museum and the Los Angeles Unified School District announced a multi-year partnership that provided intensive arts instruction in elementary and middle schools, supported substantially by Arnold's bequest. By 2015, LACMA was spending approximately $1 million annually on arts curriculum materials and artist-led workshops in public schools through programs supported by the endowment.

== Other philanthropy ==
Arnold supported educational and cultural institutions beyond LACMA. At UCLA she contributed sculptor Anna Mahler's Tower of Masks to the university's sculpture garden. A 1967 Time article on the garden identified Arnold as a former actress who had performed as Anna Kostant.

Arnold and her son Peter Bing also helped establish Bing Nursery School at Stanford University. Their gift, matched by a National Science Foundation grant, enabled the laboratory preschool and research center to open in 1966. Arnold had earlier taught parent-education classes in Los Angeles, and Stanford later connected her interest in early childhood education with her support for the school.

At the California Institute of Technology, Arnold and Peter Bing endowed the Bing Professorship in Behavioral Biology in 1970. She also supported the University of Southern California and California State University, Los Angeles, where the Anna Bing Arnold Children's Center bears her name.

== Personal life ==
Her first husband was New York real-estate developer Leo S. Bing, a partner in the family real-estate business Bing & Bing. Bing was nearly 30 years her senior. The couple had one son, Peter S. Bing, and frequently vacationed in California before moving there from New York. Leo Bing died before construction of LACMA's Wilshire Boulevard campus; Arnold subsequently financed the museum's Bing Theater in his memory.

After Bing's death, she married Aerol Arnold, a professor of English at the University of Southern California and a Shakespeare scholar. Arnold later endowed the Aerol Arnold Chair in English at USC in his memory, as well as a chair bearing Leo Bing's name. Both husbands predeceased her.

Her son, Peter Bing, became a physician, public-health official, real-estate executive and philanthropist. He worked on health policy during the Kennedy and Johnson administrations and later became a major benefactor and trustee of Stanford University. Anna Bing Arnold and her son jointly helped establish Stanford's Bing Nursery School in the 1960s.

Through Peter, Arnold was the grandmother of film producer, businessman and political donor Steve Bing. Steve Bing inherited part of the Bing family real-estate fortune and became known as a film financier and philanthropist as well as for his highly publicized personal life. Steve Bing was the father of Damian Hurley, his son with actress Elizabeth Hurley, and Kira Bonder.

== Death and legacy ==
Arnold died in 2003. In addition to her LACMA education endowment, her estate left $4 million to the City of Los Angeles to acquire land for playgrounds and parks in low-income neighborhoods. The city ultimately used the bequest to create small parks in Panorama City, Historic Filipinotown, and South Los Angeles.

The Bing Theater remained one of the best-known physical reminders of Arnold's role in LACMA's creation. It hosted film screenings, concerts, lectures, and other public programs for more than five decades. The Leo S. Bing Center was demolished in April 2020 along with other buildings of LACMA's original 1965 campus as construction began on the museum's new David Geffen Galleries.

Although the theater no longer exists, works acquired with Arnold's support remain in LACMA's collection, including the group of monumental Assyrian palace reliefs, which were displayed in the inaugural presentation at the Geffen Galleries in 2026. Her posthumous education endowment also continued her influence on the museum's programs beyond its physical campus.

== See also ==
- Los Angeles County Museum of Art
- History of Los Angeles
