= Lauren McQueen =

English actress

- Born: Lauren Louise McQueen; 12 July 1996 (age 30); Liverpool, England
- Occupation: Actress
- Years active: 2012–present
- Known for: Hollyoaks (2017–2019)

Lauren Louise McQueen (born 12 July 1996) is an English actress. She won two British Soap Awards for her performance as Lily Drinkwell in the Channel 4 soap opera Hollyoaks (2017–2019). Her films include The Wasting (2017). More recently, she starred in the MGM+ series Robin Hood (2025).

== Early life and education ==
McQueen is from Fazakerley, a suburb in north Liverpool. She attended Blessed Sacrament Catholic Primary School in Aintree and then St John Bosco Arts College in Croxteth. She took classes with Elliott-Clarke Performing Arts from the age of five and later Allstars Casting.

== Career ==
McQueen's first credited acting role was as Yasmin Goody on the BBC One miniseries Good Cop. She then appeared as Alison on the Christmas-comedy drama Little Crackers.

In 2013, McQueen appeared as Rachel in the CBBC musical-comedy show 4 O'Clock Club for four episodes as a love interest to the main character, Josh. She subsequently played Molly in the Channel 4 series The Mill and Amelie in the BBC One drama Ordinary Lies. McQueen made her feature film debut starring as Shelly in The Violators, for which she was awarded Best Actress at the 2016 Nashville Film Festival. Also in 2016, McQueen portrayed Catherine Howard, the fifth wife of Henry VIII of England (Richard Ridgins) in an episode of the docuseries Six Wives with Lucy Worsley. She starred as Sophie in the 2017 British-Canadian film-drama The Wasting.

On 22 December 2016, it was announced McQueen had been cast as Lily Drinkwell, Diane O'Connor's (Alex Fletcher) niece, in the Channel 4 soap opera Hollyoaks. She made her first onscreen appearance on 6 January 2017. McQueen's character was involved in a relationship with Prince McQueen (Malique Thompson-Dwyer) and a self-harming storyline, on which McQueen worked with the charities Samaritan and Mind for an accurate portrayal. The storyline won Best Storyline and Best Single Episode in the British Soap Awards 2018. McQueen exited the soap in 2019.

After leaving Hollyoaks, McQueen appeared in the second series of Bulletproof on Sky One as Chantel. In 2024, McQueen has roles in the Apple TV+ war miniseries Masters of the Air, the MGM+ period drama Belgravia: The Next Chapter, and the drama film Here.

== Filmography ==
=== Film ===
Year	Title	Role	Notes
2015	The Violators	Shelly	
2017	The Wasting	Sophie	
2024	Strictly Confidential	Rebecca	
2024	Here	Elizabeth	

=== Television ===
Year	Title	Role	Notes
2012	Good Cop	Yasmin Goody	1 episode
2012	Little Crackers	Alison	1 episode
2013–2014	4 O'Clock Club	Rachel	4 episodes
2014	The Mill	Molly	4 episodes
2015	Ordinary Lies	Amelie	4 episodes
2016	Six Wives with Lucy Worsley	Catherine Howard	1 episode
2017–2019	Hollyoaks	Lily Drinkwell	Main role, 163 episodes
2020	Bulletproof	Chantel	2 episodes
2024	Belgravia: The Next Chapter	Nell	3 episodes
2024	Masters of the Air	Rose	Miniseries, 2 episodes
2025–present	Outlander: Blood of My Blood	Seema	6 episodes
2025–present	Robin Hood	Marian	6 episodes

== Awards ==
Year	Organisation	Award	Work	Result	Ref.
2016	Nashville Film Festival	Best Actresses	Sophie in The Violators	Won	
2018	British Soap Awards	Best Newcomer	Lily McQueen in Hollyoaks	Shortlisted	
2018	British Soap Awards	Best Storyline	Lily's self harm	Won	
2018	British Soap Awards	Best Single Episode	Three Mothers, Three Daughters	Won	
2019	British Soap Awards	Best Actress	Lily McQueen in Hollyoaks	Shortlisted	
