= The Wasting =

- Film poster
- Directed by: Carolyn Saunders
- Written by: Carolyn Saunders
- Produced by: Jeanne Stromberg; Carolyn Saunders; Alan Hausegger
- Starring: Lauren McQueen; Gray O'Brien; Alexz Johnson
- Cinematography: Michal Wisniowski
- Edited by: Diane Brunjes
- Music by: Matthew Chung; Marko Koumoulas
- Production companies: Endzone Films; Stromhaus Productions
- Distributed by: Indiecan Entertainment (Canada)
- Release dates: 13 January 2017 (Borrego Springs Film Festival); 1 June 2018 (Canada)
- Running time: 93 minutes
- Countries: Canada; United Kingdom
- Language: English

The Wasting is a 2017 Canadian-British drama film written and directed by Carolyn Saunders and starring Lauren McQueen, Gray O'Brien, and Alexz Johnson. It screened at film festivals in Europe and North America, winning Best Horror at the 2017 Austrian Independent Film Festival and Best Feature awards in two categories at the Vittorio Veneto film festival. The film's public premiere took place in Toronto on March 2, 2018, and it was released online in the United States and Canada in June 2018.

== Plot ==
A teenage woman faces emotional challenges – a budding romance with her new boyfriend and growing conflicts with her father's strictness. While trying to deal with these issues, she stops eating. While her health deteriorates because of her eating disorder, she sees the ghost of a frightening old woman every night. Her friends and family believe these sightings are hallucinatory or mere nightmares. With no one believing her, she must search for a solution.

== Cast ==
- Alexz Johnson as Grace
- Gray O'Brien as Ilyas
- Lauren McQueen as Sophie
- Shelagh McLeod as Valerie
- Peter Sacco as Dr. Barlas
- Brendan Flynn as Kai
- Anna Treasure as Virginia
- Sean Saunders Stevenson as Liam
- Jacqueline McMillan as Dr. Hiddleston
- Catriona McDonald as Philippa

== Production ==
Writer-director Saunders said that her inspiration came while writing for the documentary series Ghostly Encounters, when she met an anorexic young woman whom nobody believed was visited nightly by a ghost. The woman's story became the television episode, "Anorexia and the Haunting Hag," and, intrigued by the relationship between eating disorders and the supernatural, Saunders wrote The Wasting "with input from several people suffering anorexia."

Initially, the filmmakers attempted to fund the movie through the Canadian Film Centre's CFC Features program, which would have required filming in Canada. When Canadian Film Centre funding was unavailable, production was moved to Upton-upon-Severn in Worcestershire, U.K., to benefit from the UK Film Tax Relief program and the availability of experienced crew and actors.

During early development of the film, Saunders approached her friend Alexz Johnson to participate as actor, musician, and co-producer. Saunders described the movie as a "family affair," as her sons, Brendan Flynn and Sean Stevenson appear in the cast as brothers.

== Release ==
The Wasting premiered to excellent reviews at the 2017 Borrego Springs Film Festival in Borrego Springs, California. The film won the Best Horror award at the 2017 Austrian Independent Film Festival, and was an official selection at the Carmarthen Bay Film Festival, the Madeira Film Festival, and the Nevada Women's Film Festival. At the Vittorio Veneto film festival, The Wasting won the Monte Pizzoc and Monte Visentin awards, voted by more than 1000 young adults in the audience.

North American rights to distribute The Wasting were acquired by IndieCan Entertainment in 2017. In 2018, the North American premiere of the film took place in Toronto. The online release of the film for Canada and the United States took place in June 2018.

=== Critical reception ===
At its Borrego Springs Film Festival premiere, Steve Oldfield of FoxTV called The Wasting "a mind-bending visual feast" and said "director Carolyn Saunders' first feature shows she is a force to be reckoned with - a visual storyteller with a gift for creating suspense." After a sold out premiere screening in Toronto, The Extra Mile said "Saunders has woven many visual and sound elements to create a compelling film that shines a light on perception and reality," praising Lauren McQueen's "stellar performance" and the "poignant portrayals of Johnson, Flynn and Stevenson." Leora Heilbronn in Brief Take said "there’s a hauntingly ghoulish subplot in there that’s reminiscent of a Gaskell or Poe story, but the film also tackles the all too prevalent acceptance of toxic masculinity and anorexia in a refreshingly original way." Edmonton Movie Guide called it "a thoughtful, complex film" in which "the characters are well drawn and realistic, strongly portrayed by the young, highly watchable cast." Other reviews were mixed, and mostly positive.
