= Steve Bing =

American businessman and film producer (1965–2020)

- Born: Stephen Leo Bing; March 31, 1965; New York City, U.S.
- Died: June 22, 2020 (aged 55); Los Angeles, California, U.S.
- Education: Stanford University
- Occupations: Businessman; film producer; investor; philanthropist
- Years active: 1993–2020
- Children: 2, including Damian Hurley

Stephen Leo Bing (March 31, 1965 – June 22, 2020) was an American businessman, film producer, investor, and philanthropist. He had business interests in property and construction and was the founder of Shangri-La Entertainment and Shangri-La Music.

== Early life ==
Bing was born in New York City on March 31, 1965. His parents were Helen, a nurse, and Peter Bing, a doctor in public health. Peter Bing was an heir to the fortune of the New York real estate company Bing & Bing, co-founded by Steve Bing's grandfather, Leo S. Bing. His grandmother was Anna Bing Arnold, a noted philanthropist and one of the original benefactors of the Los Angeles County Museum of Art. He was Jewish on his father's side and Croatian on his mother's. Bing attended the Harvard-Westlake School in Los Angeles. At the age of 18, he inherited an estimated $600 million from his grandfather, Leo S. Bing, a real estate developer who had made his fortune in New York in the 1920s. The Los Angeles Business Journal's January 2010 publication of "The Lists 2010" listed him in its "Wealthiest Angelenos" section of the magazine, which estimated his worth at $590 million, coming in at No. 46. After inheriting his fortune, Bing dropped out of Stanford University in his junior year to pursue a career in the entertainment industry.

== Entertainment industry ==
In 2000, Bing launched his own production company, Shangri-La Entertainment. He reportedly invested around $85 million to co-finance The Polar Express, an animated film featuring the voice of Tom Hanks, which earned $285 million globally and was one of the year's box-office successes. Bing was the financier of Robert Zemeckis' Beowulf and the financier and producer of Shine a Light, a Rolling Stones concert film directed by Martin Scorsese.

In addition to his career financing and producing movies, he co-wrote the 1985 film, Missing in Action II: The Beginning, and the story and screenplay for the 2003 film, Kangaroo Jack. Bing also financed and produced the independently released Jerry Lee Lewis album Last Man Standing.

== Politics ==
Beginning with a $500 contribution in 1993 to support Senator Frank Lautenberg, D-N.J. in his bid for re-election, Bing contributed more than $10.7 million at the federal level to the Democratic Party and its candidates.

The biggest checks were written in 2002 when he gave a total of $8.2 million to the Democratic National Committee. He also gave to specific candidates, including Al Gore, Hillary Clinton, John Kerry, Nancy Pelosi, and Dianne Feinstein.

Bing was reported to have given at least $49.5 million during the 2006 election cycle in support of Proposition 87, a California initiative which sought to raise $4 billion in oil production taxes to help develop alternative fuels. Bing also supported several key races in other parts of the country as Democrats fought to win back control of Congress. They included Democratic challenger Bob Casey, Jr. in Pennsylvania, who unseated conservative GOP incumbent Senator Rick Santorum, and future United States senator Tammy Duckworth in Illinois, then a Democratic congressional hopeful and an Army National Guard major who lost her legs in Iraq, who went on to lose to State Senator Peter Roskam in that race. Excluding Prop. 87 contributions, in California Bing donated $7.8 million from 2000 on, according to the California secretary of state. He spent $4.25 million in 2005 in a successful effort to defeat Prop. 77, a redistricting initiative sponsored by Gov. Arnold Schwarzenegger. Other beneficiaries of his political pursuits included: the California Democratic Party ($640,172); Governor Gray Davis ($675,000); and San Francisco Mayor Gavin Newsom, whose campaign received $750 in 2004.

In October 2008, Bing pledged to match donations made to the NO on Proposition 8 campaign from October 17 to October 19.

On December 18, 2008, the William J. Clinton Foundation released a list of all contributors. It included Stephen L. Bing, who gave between US$10–25 million.

On August 5, 2009, a 737 private aircraft owned by Bing and based at Hollywood Burbank Airport in Southern California, was utilized in the return of American reporters Laura Ling and Euna Lee who had spent 5 months of a 12-year sentence in North Korea. Former President Bill Clinton was instrumental in their return and accompanied the reporters back to the United States. Bing reportedly covered the whole cost of the flight, estimated to be around $200,000.

== Personal life ==
=== Lisa Bonder ===
In 2001, Bing sued billionaire Kirk Kerkorian for invasion of privacy. Bing alleged that convicted criminal and private investigator Anthony Pellicano took Bing's dental floss out of his trash to collect his DNA. At the time, Kerkorian was in a legal fight with his former wife Lisa Bonder, a former professional tennis player, over the amount of child support he would pay, with the billionaire reportedly suspecting Bing (a previous boyfriend) to be the biological father of Bonder's daughter Kira. After Bing was proven by DNA testing to be the father of Bonder's child, Bing and Kerkorian settled their dispute out of court.

=== Elizabeth Hurley ===
Bing had a relationship with Elizabeth Hurley, which resulted in a pregnancy. Bing urged Hurley to have an abortion, but Hurley refused. Bing denied paternity by alleging that he and Hurley had a brief, non-exclusive relationship in 2001. However, a DNA test established Bing as the child's father. Hurley gave birth to Damian Charles Hurley on April 4, 2002. Hugh Grant is Damian's godfather.

=== Anthony Pellicano ===
The paternity of Bonder's daughter was revealed by Anthony Pellicano, a private investigator (and wiretapper) hired by Kerkorian's lawyer, who was also a "friend" to Bing. According to an FBI summary, Pellicano sometimes played Hollywood clients against each other, at one point asking financier (and Bing friend) Ron Burkle for a $100,000 to $250,000 shakedown in order not to be investigated by Michael Ovitz, another Pellicano client. In a twist to the case, The New York Times reported payments of $335,000 by Bing to Pellicano between June 2000 and August 2002.

According to excerpts of recorded calls, Pellicano bragged to Kerkorian's lawyer in April and May 2002 that he was "working for" and "consulting for" Bing in matters related to Elizabeth Hurley and her son's disputed paternity, which was then in the news. Martin Singer, a lawyer for Bing, called Pellicano's statement regarding Hurley "an absolute lie." (Daily Mail reportedly paid a "substantial" settlement to Bing in 2003 after Pellicano's sworn statement that he had "never been engaged by Mr. Bing nor his attorney Mr. Martin Singer to investigate anyone on Mr. Bing's behalf, including Ms. Hurley.") Following two trials in 2008, in which Bing did not testify, Pellicano was convicted of 78 counts of wiretapping, racketeering, wire fraud, and conspiracy. Pellicano was sentenced to 15 years in prison and ordered, with Terry N. Christensen, to forfeit $2 million.

== Philanthropy ==
In April 2012, Bing committed to join The Giving Pledge, set up by Bill Gates and Warren Buffett, willingly donating the majority of his wealth to charity.

== Death ==
Bing died by suicide on June 22, 2020, at the age of 55 by jumping from his condominium on the 27th floor of the Ten Thousand building at 10000 Santa Monica Boulevard in the Century City neighborhood of Los Angeles. He had been depressed about lack of human contact during the coronavirus quarantine. While this was suggested by his friends to be the reason for his suicide, the ultimate reason remains unknown.

With a past linked to drug addiction, including the recent loss of a close girlfriend due to overdose, a history of failed investments in the film industry and failed relationships with both lovers and his own estranged children, at the time of his death, he was worth $300,000 in liquid assets having spent almost all of the $600 million he had inherited.
