= Christabel Bielenberg =

British writer (1909–2003)

- Born: Christabel Mary Burton; 18 June 1909; Totteridge, Hertfordshire, England
- Died: 2 November 2003 (aged 94); Tullow, County Carlow, Ireland
- Citizenship: German
- Education: St Margaret's School, Bushey, Hertfordshire, England
- Occupation: writer
- Spouse: Peter Bielenberg (m. 1934)
- Children: 3
- Writing career
- Language: English, German
- Genre: Biography
- Notable work: The Past is Myself (1968)

Signature
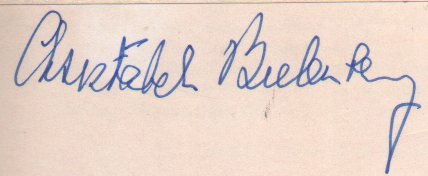

Christabel Mary Bielenberg (née Burton, 18 June 1909 – 2 November 2003) was a British writer who was married to a German lawyer, Peter Bielenberg. She described her experiences living in Germany during the Second World War in two books: The Past is Myself (1968) and The Road Ahead (1992).

== Early life ==
Christabel Mary Burton was born in Totteridge, Hertfordshire, to Anglo-Irish parents. Her mother, Christabel Harmsworth, was the sister of the British newspapers publishers Alfred Harmsworth, 1st Viscount Northcliffe, Cecil Bisshopp Harmsworth, 1st Baron Harmsworth, and Harold Sidney Harmsworth, 1st Viscount Rothermere. Her father was Lieutenant colonel Percy Collingwood Burton, who had served with the distinction in the British army during the Boer Wars and World War I. She had a sister and two brothers and was nicknamed Chrismary by her siblings.

Bielenberg was educated as a boarder at St Margaret's School, Bushey, Hertfordshire, had at least one season as a debutante and went to finishing school in Paris, France. She won a scholarship to Somerville College, Oxford, but decided instead to study music in Hamburg, Germany, in the hope of becoming a professional opera singer and to learn the German language. While there she met Peter Heinrich Wilhelm Bielenberg (1911–2001), two years her junior, who was studying law with a view to joining his father's legal practice.

== Marriage and life in Nazi Germany ==
Christabel and Peter married on 29 September 1934 at the German Embassy office in London, which required her to relinquish her British citizenship and take German citizenship. The Bielenbergs lived initially in Hamburg, then moved to Berlin and had three sons, Nicholas, Christopher, and John. In 1940, Nicholas protested when his schoolteacher called the English 'schweine' (meaning pigs) and was expelled from school. This and the heavy Allied bombing raids led Bielenberg and her children to leave the city. They travelled to Denmark and Austria before they eventually settled in the village of Rohrbach, near Furtwangen im Schwarzwald, in the Black Forest.

Both Christabel and Peter Bielenberg were opposed to Nazism and, following Hitler's rise to power in 1933, participated in anti-Nazi activities. Peter took a job with the Ministry of Industry and Commerce in Berlin in February 1939 in an attempt to become closer to the centre of Nazi power. Christabel briefly hid a young Jewish couple.

Christabel and Peter Bielenberg were close friends of Adam von Trott zu Solz, who was involved in the 20 July Plot against Hitler in 1944. Following the failure of the plot and as a result of his suspect political views and this close association with Trott, Bielenberg's husband was arrested, interrogated, and imprisoned in Ravensbrück concentration camp. He was held in the punishment block for male SS guards who were unwilling to follow their orders. Peter managed to pass Christabel a note from inside the camp outlining his response to interrogation, which was that he had no interest in politics and that he knew the conspirators only socially. She was also able to visit him in the camp due to the influence of Nazi acquaintances she was friendly with.

In an effort to secure her husband’s release, Bielenberg asked to be interviewed by the Gestapo to convince them of her and her husband's political naivete and innocence. She was interviewed by SS-Sturmbannführer Herbert Lange. During their interview she emphasised her Irish blood, reminded him of her upper-class network of connections in England and hinted that she might be able to help him after the war. She was successful in securing her husband’s release from Ravensbruck, but he was transferred to a punishment squad clearing minefields on the eastern front. He managed to slip away and went into hiding near his family in the Black Forest until the war ended.

== Life post World War II ==
After the war, Bielenberg returned to Britain with her children and husband, and renaturalised herself as a British citizen. She said of the move: "all our friends in Germany had been murdered by Hitler, so we left." In 1948, the family settled in Tullow, County Carlow, Ireland, buying a dilapidated farm called "Munny House", which they transformed into a commercial success. From the farm Bielenberg also fundraised for the widows and children of men who died as a result of the failed 1944 assassination plot.

Bielenberg wrote her first book, The Past is Myself, which recounted her life in Germany during Hitler's rise to power and throughout the war, and it became a best seller after publication in 1968. The book opened with the line: "I am English; I was German, and above all I was there." In 1974, Bielenberg described attempting to shelter Jews hiding from persecution in the television series The World at War. A sequel to her autobiography, titled The Road Ahead, was released in 1992.

Bielenberg was made a Commander of the German Federal Order of Merit in 1988 for her contribution to German-English understanding. She was awarded a Gold Medal of Merit by the European Parliament in 1993.

Bielenberg's husband died on 13 March 2001. She died of bronchopneumonia in 2003 at home in Tullow, County Carlow, Ireland.

She was survived by her three sons, Nicholas, John, and Christopher. Her sons Nicholas and Christopher married sisters, Charlotte and Angela, respectively, both daughters of the government official and executed German Resistance member Fritz-Dietlof von der Schulenburg.

== Book adaptation ==
Bielenberg's experiences during the Second World War were made into the BBC television drama serial Christabel (1988), adapted by Dennis Potter from her memoir. Elizabeth Hurley starred in the title role.

== Portrait bust ==
Bielenberg sat for sculptor Alan Thornhill for a portrait in clay. The correspondence file relating to the Bielenberg bust is held in the archive of the Henry Moore Foundation's Henry Moore Institute in Leeds, Yorkshire, and the terracotta remains in the collection of the artist.
