= Tomorrow We Live (1942 film) =

1942 film by Edgar George Ulmer

- Directed by: Edgar G. Ulmer
- Written by: Bart Lytton (original story); Bart Lytton (screenplay)
- Produced by: Andre Dumonceau (associate producer); Seymour Nebenzal (producer)
- Starring: See below
- Cinematography: Jack Greenhalgh
- Edited by: Dan Milner
- Music by: Leo Erdody
- Color process: Black and white
- Distributed by: Producers Releasing Corporation
- Release date: September 23, 1942
- Running time: 64 minutes
- Country: United States
- Language: English

Tomorrow We Live, also known as The Man with a Conscience in the United Kingdom, is a 1942 American film directed by Edgar G. Ulmer.

== Plot ==
Julie Bronson's father is an owner of a cafe in the desert. It unintentionally attracts the attention of criminal Alexander Martin, who operates a nightclub nearby. He chanted Julie's father because he knows he's an escaped prisoner. When a rival gang strikes Martin's nightclub short and small, he gets responsible for Julie's father. He shot him before the eyes of Julie.

== Cast ==
- Ricardo Cortez as The Ghost, Alexander Caesar Martin
- Jean Parker as Julie Bronson
- Emmett Lynn as William "Pop" Bronson
- William Marshall as Lt. Bob Lord
- Rose Anne Stevens as Melba
- Ray Miller as Chick
- Frank Hagney as Kohler
- Rex Lease as Shorty
- Jack Ingram as Steve
- Barbara Slater as The Blonde
- Jane Hale as The Dancer

== Soundtrack ==
- "Juke Box Gal" (Written by Leo Erdody)
- "Senorita Chula" (Written by Ann Levitt and Leo Erdody)
