= Damian Hurley =

British actor and model (born 2002)

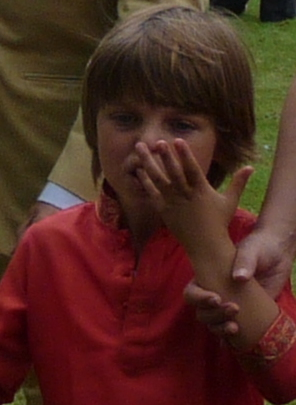
- Hurley in 2008
- Born: Damian Charles Hurley; 4 April 2002 (age 24); London, England
- Citizenship: United Kingdom; United States
- Occupations: Director; model
- Years active: 2016–present
- Height: 185 cm (6 ft 1 in)
- Parents: Steve Bing (father); Elizabeth Hurley (mother)

Damian Charles Hurley (born 4 April 2002) is an English actor and model. He is the son of actress Elizabeth Hurley and American businessman Steve Bing.

== Early life ==
Hurley was born in Portland Hospital, London, to actress Elizabeth Hurley and American businessman Steve Bing. Although Bing initially denied paternity, a DNA test subsequently confirmed him as the father. In a court settlement of his child support obligations, Bing agreed to pay £1.8 million in annual installments of £100,000 for Hurley, although his mother declined to accept the payments.

In 2021, a legal dispute regarding the distribution of his late father's estate resulted in a settlement confirming Hurley’s entitlement to a share of the family trust.

Hurley's godfathers include Hugh Grant, David Beckham, Elton John and Denis Leary.

Hurley grew up in Gloucestershire with his mother and her then-spouse, Indian business tycoon Arun Nayar.

Hurley later lived part time in Australia because of his mother's relationship with Australian cricket player Shane Warne.

== Career ==
In July 2016, it was announced that Hurley had been cast as Prince Hansel von Liechtenstein in The Royals, an E! series which stars his mother as the Queen of the United Kingdom. Hurley plays a reality TV star in the December 2016 episode "Aye, There's the Rub". He reprised the role in the April 2018 episode "My News Shall Be the Fruit to That Great Feast".

In September 2018, Hurley was signed by model agency Tess Management.

In July 2019, Hurley fronted Pat McGrath's 'Sublime Perfection' campaign. Hurley told Vogue, "It feels strange being referred to as a model" before explaining, "When I was 17, I got a call saying that [fashion photographer] Steven Meisel wanted me in New York the next day to front a new campaign. I'd never modelled before, but in a moment of madness I agreed, flew out, did the shoot and made it back to school in time for my first class on Monday."

In July 2020, Hurley signed with IMG.
