= List of Doctors characters introduced in 2023 =

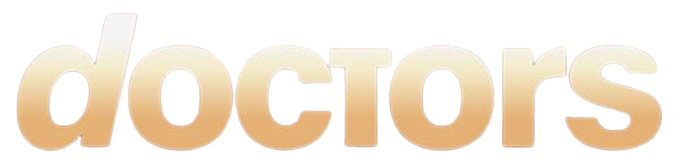
Doctors logo.

Doctors is a British medical soap opera which began broadcasting on BBC One on 26 March 2000. Set in the fictional West Midlands town of Letherbridge, the soap follows the lives of the staff and patients of the Mill Health Centre, a fictional NHS doctor's surgery, as well as its sister surgery, the University of Letherbridge Campus Surgery. Kirsty Millar (Kiruna Stamell) is hired as a receptionist in January, while Wendi Peters made her debut as Nina Bulsara in February. In March, Rahul Arya joined the cast as Dr. Suni Bulsara, Nina's son. He was followed by his aunt, Binita Prabhu (Nina Wadia), who appeared for a guest stint in April. April also saw the arrival of midwife Malika Dahlan (Aria Prasad), as well as Tanisha Fonesca (Andrea Ali), a love interest for Bear Sylvester (Dex Lee). In May, student Miles Bailey (Louis Saxby) made his first appearance, as well as PC Claudia Briant (Kiza Deen), a police officer and love interest for Bear. September saw a guest stint from Andrea Mason as Frankie Sharp, an angry patient at the Mill. Then in November, midwife Jenny Ackerman (Lois Pearson) debuted. Additionally, multiple other characters appear throughout the year.

== Kirsty Millar ==
Kirsty Millar
- Doctors character
- Portrayed by: Kiruna Stamell
- Duration: 2023–2024
- First appearance: "The Sinister Hand"; 11 January 2023
- Last appearance: "The Nest"; 25 September 2024
- Introduced by: Mike Hobson
In-universe information
- Occupation: Receptionist; Assistant practice manager
- Husband: Rich Millar
- Sons: Ollie Millar

Kirsty Millar, portrayed by Kiruna Stamell, made her first appearance on 11 January 2023. She is introduced as a receptionist at the Mill Health Centre following the dismissal of former receptionist Valerie Pitman (Sarah Moyle). In her first scene, she meets with Ruhma Carter (Bharti Patel), who she has known for years due to working with her at St. Phils Hospital. Ruhma has high praise for Kirsty, informing the staff at the Mill how experienced she is. Speaking of her first episode, What's on TV wrote that Kirsty would divide the existing staff due to her "forthright manner". On her BBC profile, Kirsty was described as an "organised, loving, opinionated" character that "doesn't suffer fools". It also stated that her reason for coming to the Mill was to seek a new life. TVTimes wrote that thirty-something Kirsty would surprise the staff; Bear Sylvester (Dex Lee) "quickly realises she isn't backwards in coming forwards" when she immediately demands a new reception desk due to her dwarfism, while Emma Reid (Dido Miles) is "thrown" when Kirsty intercepts and takes over between herself and an angry patient.

What's on TV also teased the imminent arrivals of her husband and son, Rich (Richard Atwill) and Ollie (Isaac Benn). Simon Timblick of What to Watch confirmed that Kirsty's home life would be a focal point of her first storyline in the series. She is shown to not want to be with Rich anymore and a week into her time on Doctors, she tells him to pack his belongings and leave. She also has difficulties with Ollie reluctantly joining the army. Inside Soap also hinted that Kirsty and fellow receptionist Scarlett Kiernan (Kia Pegg) would have a workplace dispute when the pair "rub each other up the wrong way". However, a friendship between the pair is eventually developed when Kirsty invites Scarlett to live with her.

Stamell appeared on the BBC topical series Morning Live in March 2023 to talk about her time on Doctors, where she said that she was grateful to be given a character backstory that did not revolve around being disabled. Presenter Gethin Jones remarked that Kirsty does not reference her dwarfism, which Stamell replied that she is thankful for. She felt that because Kirsty's family and colleagues would be used to her condition, there would be no point in talking about it since it is part of her everyday life. Since Stamell has an Australian-influenced accent from her time living there, Sam Quek asked how she had learned the Brummie dialect. Stamell recalled listening to audiobooks narrated by Jess Phillips and Alison Hammond and said that she was influenced by their accents. She struggled to pick up the accent at first, but began to feel more comfortable using it the longer she had stayed in the role. Alongside Atwill and Benn, Stamell was nominated for the Best Family accolade at the 2023 British Soap Awards.

Stamell departed the role in 2024 and Kirsty's final episode was broadcast on 25 September 2024. Despite Doctors being confirmed to end in December 2024, Stamell's departure prior to finale was not announced to the public and was instead left as a surprise to viewers. Following her exit, Stamell said that her favourite storyline was Kirsty's romance with Dave Burns (Gareth Berliner). Berliner is Stamell's real-life husband and she revealed that her favourite scene was one that never aired, of Dave trying to seduce Kirsty with French cuisine when Berliner dropped a baguette.

== Nina Bulsara ==
Dr. Nina Bulsara, portrayed by Wendi Peters, first appeared on 20 February 2023. Peters began filming for Doctors in October 2022 and announced her casting on the BBC topical series Morning Live on 2 November 2022. Prior to being cast as Nina, Peters had portrayed Nicky Connelly in a 2021 episode of Doctors. Peters clarified that Nina is a different and unconnected character. On Peters' casting, executive producer Mike Hobson said: "we are absolutely delighted to welcome Wendi to the Doctors cast. She is a familiar face every soap fan will recognise and we know she will be brilliant in this role."

Helen Daly of the Radio Times described Nina as "a chatterbox who has an opinion on everything and everyone" and opined that while she can be overbearing for her fellow colleagues, she is "a ray of light and will always find the positive in any difficult situation". Daly wrote that Nina would be a good addition to the cast, as well as Metro's Calli Kitson being intrigued by the character. Peters' co-star Elisabeth Dermot Walsh posted online that she was excited for viewers to meet the "charming, dynamic and maddening character". Also writing for the Metro, Chris Hallam described Nina as "bossy, interfering and annoying".

== Suni Bulsara ==
Suni Bulsara
- Doctors character
- Portrayed by: Rahul Arya; Riyaan Adams (2023 flashback)
- Duration: 2023–2024
- First appearance: "Horse to Water"; 8 March 2023
- Last appearance: "One Day Like This"; 14 November 2024
- Introduced by: Mike Hobson
In-universe information
- Occupation: General practitioner
- Father: Rahul Bulsara
- Mother: Nina Bulsara
- Aunts: Binita Prabhu

Dr. Suni Bulsara, portrayed by Rahul Arya, made first appearance on 8 March 2023. He was introduced as the son of Nina (Wendi Peters). Nina becomes a partner at the Mill Health Centre and one of her first acts is getting Suni hired as a doctor there as she feels he would be perfect to work there. Upon his hiring, it was hinted in episode descriptions that he would "ruffle feathers" amongst his new colleagues. Suni arrives on his first day in a luxury sports car which he parks in the charging port section of the car park. Scarlett Kiernan (Kia Pegg) tells him he cannot park there, but he ignores her since he wants to show off his car in a prominent location. A reluctant Scarlett gives him a tour of the building, but Suni quickly gets bored and wanders into Luca McIntyre's (Ross McLaren) nursing room where he is "favourably impressed by the sight of Luca".

Suni is bisexual and after flirting with Luca, he also flirts with Scarlett. However, Luca notices that he clams up when Nina walks in on the pair talking, and eventually learns that Suni is not out to his mother. A few weeks into his tenure, Suni was the focus of a standalone episode that saw him helping Jason Neale (Darryl Mundoma) with his mental health, as well as flashing back to see his reaction to Nina getting him a job without telling him. It touched upon his memories of his dead father when Suni hoped that he would be proud of him. Suni is shown to be insecure within his friendships and tries to impress the colleagues at the Mill by treating them to lavish meals and experiences, which Sid Vere (Ashley Rice) notices and gets annoyed by. Metro's Chris Hallam noted how Suni makes a bad first impression on almost everybody at the Mill and suggested that he may be "too flash and not really cut out to be a doctor".

== Binita Prabhu ==
Binita Prabhu, portrayed by Nina Wadia, appeared between 6 and 17 April 2023. She was introduced as Suni Bulsara's (Rahul Arya) aunt. Metro's Chris Hallam described Binita as "a dreadfully overbearing relative", with What to Watch's Simon Timblick adding that she is "hard to please". When Binita's sister-in-law, Nina Bulsara (Wendi Peters) learns that she plans on visiting them, she clears the house of all microwave meals, as well as hiring a cleaner to avoid criticism from Binita. Suni assumes that Nina is overreacting, but Nina is "soon vindicated".

Upon her arrival, she uses Nina "like a human coat hanger" and makes comments about how she is not feeding Suni enough. Binita then attempts to set Suni up with an Indian scientist that she knows, as well as offending Nina by billing her work at the Mill Health Centre a hobby. Hallam hinted that both Nina and Suni would not be able to put up with more of Binita's behaviour over time. Her guest stint climaxed with a showdown between the three of them when Nina and Suni tire of Binita's judgements.

== Malika Dahlan ==
Malika Dahlan
- Doctors character
- Portrayed by: Aria Prasad
- First appearance: "Optics"; 19 April 2023
- Last appearance: "Rebirth"; 6 June 2023
- Introduced by: Mike Hobson
In-universe information
- Occupation: Midwife

Malika Dahlan, portrayed by Aria Prasad, first appeared on 19 April 2023 and made her final appearance on 6 June 2023. Prasad was contracted on the soap for a three-month guest stint to cover an extended break of regular cast member Bharti Patel. Malika was introduced as a temporary midwife at St. Phils Hospital who covers for Ruhma Carter (Patel), who is sent to work at East Letherbridge for three months. Malika's first episode sees her meet "troubled young couple" Katie Seary (Heather Campbell-Ferguson) and Ben Tate (Elliot Norman). Prasad's second appearance on Doctors saw her star in a standalone Ramadan-themed episode where her character "faces a heartbreaking tragedy". A mother in her care dies, which causes Malika to call in sick. She seeks advice from Ruhma, who tells her to confide in her colleagues. She is then invited to a community iftar to lift her spirits.

Malika struggles with the heavy workload within the NHS and is advised by former colleague Maisie Owens (Jacqui-Lee Pryce) to become a private midwife for her wellbeing. Patient Kim Lewis (Lorraine Tai) also makes a judgemental comment about the NHS' services, which makes Malika confront Kim and defend her decision to work for the NHS. She is again shown to be a headstrong and knowledgeable character when she reprimands Dr Penny Phillips (Angelina Chudi) for not listening to her expertise as a midwife.

== Tanisha Fonesca ==
Tanisha Fonesca
- Doctors character
- Portrayed by: Andrea Ali
- First appearance: "Optics"; 19 April 2023
- Last appearance: "Islands"; 11 May 2023
- Introduced by: Mike Hobson
In-universe information
- Occupation: Practice manager

Tanisha Fonesca, portrayed by Andrea Ali, first appeared on 19 April 2023 and made her final appearance on 11 May 2023. She was introduced as someone who went to university with Bear Sylvester (Dex Lee). They meet at a meeting about online accounting systems and after "the two old friends immediately hit it off again", they decide to leave the meeting early to go on a date. On the date, Tanisha tells Bear how she stopped working for the NHS and eventually went into the private sector. Afterwards, the pair have sex. Bear "tries to play it cool" when telling housemate Sid Vere (Ashley Rice) about meeting her, but makes it clear that he feels "a spark" between them. What to Watch journalist Simon Timblick hinted that Tanisha and Bear would have a romantic storyline.

Bear gets a visit from Tanisha at the Mill Health Centre, where he works as a business manager. He gives Tanisha a tour but is worried about what Tanisha thinks of the Mill. She tries to be respectful but tells Bear that he should move into the private sector since she feels he is better than a small NHS clinic. She arranges a job interview for Bear with one of her bosses without informing him prior to the day of the interview. Bear refuses to go and the pair argue, after which Tanisha storms out.

== Miles Bailey ==
Miles Bailey
- Doctors character
- Portrayed by: Louis Saxby
- First appearance: "Crash and Burn"; 18 May 2023
- Last appearance: "Do Not Resuscitate"; 22 June 2023
- Introduced by: Mike Hobson

Miles Bailey, portrayed by Louis Saxby, first appeared on 18 May 2023 and made his final appearance on 22 June 2023. He is a second-year medical student at Letherbridge University who is instructed by Professor Abid Anwar (Sartaj Garewal) to give Zara Carmichael (Elisabeth Dermot Walsh) a tour of the campus prior to her joining as a lecturer. Miles "doesn't hold back" by slating a number of the other lecturers and expresses his happiness that Zara will be teaching his course. After seeing her, he finds a video of her online and sits watching it. On her first day teaching, Zara is greeted by Miles, and What to Watch's Simon Timblick confirmed that Miles has a "crush" on Zara.

Continuing to be her "admirer", Miles insists on escorting Zara to her class. He helps her with a technical issue in class, and while doing so, he flirts with her. Classmate Chloe Fisher (Martha Breen) picks up on his interest in Zara and teases him, but he continues to make suggestive remarks during lectures. Zara grows tired and warns him to stop making flirtatious comments. Miles persists and kisses Zara, who returns his kiss, while Chloe takes a photo of them. Chloe then posts anonymous comments online about a lecturer taking advantage of a student, which Miles is enraged at. Once she posts the photo of them kissing, Daniel "decides to go and confront Miles at the University" under the impression that she pushed him away. Miles tells him what actually happened and shows him a video of the kiss.

== Claudia Briant ==
Claudia Briant
- Doctors character
- Portrayed by: Kiza Deen
- First appearance: "Monstrous Regimen of Women"; 24 May 2023
- Last appearance: "Sitting Duck"; 11 October 2023
- Introduced by: Mike Hobson
In-universe information
- Occupation: Police constable

PC Claudia Briant, portrayed by Kiza Deen, first appeared on 24 May 2023 and made her final appearance on 11 October 2023. She is a police constable that pulls Bear Sylvester (Dex Lee) over for speeding. Bear, who has previously been the target of racist stop-and-search situation, assumes that it is happening again and "prepares for trouble". However, since Claudia is a black female officer, his attitude is challenged. Bear is surprised when Claudia visits him at the Mill Health Centre later on in the day and worries that he is somehow in further trouble. Simon Timblick of What to Watch hinted that Claudia "has something rather unexpected to ask Bear". BBC episode descriptions confirmed that Bear and Claudia would go on a date, but that it would not go well. Bear then becomes "determined to fix things with Claudia". The pair later begin dating. Claudia later begins sharing scenes with established police officer character Rob Hollins (Chris Walker) when the pair begin working together.

Shortly into their relationship, Claudia becomes awkward with Bear after meeting one of his casual exes, Serena Bradley (Tisha Merry). Claudia "storms out" of their date, leaving Bear alarmed. She shows more tension when she meets Bear's colleague, Nina Bulsara (Wendi Peters), who she does not take well to. After feeling ill at a concert Bear takes her to, Claudia takes a pregnancy test and learns that she is pregnant. Bear becomes worried that he has done something wrong when Claudia continues not being "a ton of fun" and she reveals the result of the pregnancy test to him. She later confides in Emma Reid (Dido Miles) that she wants to abort the pregnancy, not realising that Emma works with Bear. Bear is upset that she wants to abort the baby and tries to change her mind, but she continues with her decision. She is later offered a job position with a domestic violence unit, which she accepts.

== Frankie Sharp ==
Frankie Sharp
- Doctors character
- Portrayed by: Andrea Mason
- First appearance: "Out in the Cold"; 5 September 2023
- Last appearance: "Put in the Boot"; 13 September 2023
- Introduced by: Mike Hobson
In-universe information
- Husband: Vic Butt

Frankie Sharp, portrayed by Andrea Mason, appeared from 5 to 13 September 2023. She was introduced as an angry patient that needs her repeat prescription renewed, but due to a lack of appointments for a doctor to review it, receptionist Kirsty Millar (Kiruna Stamell) informs her she may have to wait two weeks. An unhappy Frankie returns during evening surgery and takes out her anger on Scarlett Kiernan (Kia Pegg). She refuses to leave until she is seen by Al Haskey (Ian Midlane) and she soon tries to attack Scarlett in a "shock event". She is soon escorted out of the Mill by Al.

Frankie was introduced to Doctors as part of a topical plot for Scarlett's development and was inspired by real-life news stories about the violence healthcare workers face. The storyline sees all of the Mill colleagues raise questions about the staff's welfare and how they can protect the staff from further aggressive behaviour. Frankie returns two days later with "heavies": her husband, Vic Butt (Neil Sheffield), and one of their scary friends. Al and business manager Bear Sylvester (Dex Lee) confront Frankie in the reception area but Bear soon calls his girlfriend, police officer Claudia Briant (Kiza Deen), who arrives with backup. Frankie and Vic later wait outside of the Mill for Al and the pair attack him.

== Jenny Ackerman ==
Jenny Ackerman
- Doctors character
- Portrayed by: Lois Pearson
- First appearance: "SMS SOS"; 8 November 2023
- Last appearance: "Keeping Pp the Pace"; 5 December 2023
- Introduced by: Mike Hobson
In-universe information
- Occupation: Midwife

Jenny Ackerman, portrayed by Lois Pearson, first appeared on 8 November 2023 and made her final appearance on 5 December 2023. She was introduced as a newly-hired midwife that joins Ruhma Carter (Bharti Patel) at the Mill Health Centre. In her backstory, she was a nurse who did a midwifery rotation and enjoyed it so much that she decided to train in the specialism. Simon Timblick, writing for What to Watch, described her as a "bright and confident" character despite being new to midwifery. However, Ruhma becomes unnerved when she notices Jenny making mistakes on the job, including not being able to find a foetal heartbeat during a baby scan, which worries patient Tina Evans' (Eliza Williams). Timblick added that Ruhma's "pair of helping hands [would] actually going to end up creating extra work for her".

Jenny and Ruhma have "a day from hell" on the maternity ward when it is understaffed and overpopulated with pregnant patients. The events of the day see Anne Richards (Elinor Coleman) almost die after giving birth, with her partner, Dez Cruz (Daniel J Carver), vowing to avenge her. He reports her and Ruhma, which results in a meeting with head midwife Sian Howell (Alex Murdoch). After suffering from health issues, Jenny decides that she no longer wants to be a midwife.

== Other characters ==
Character	Episode date(s)	Actor	Circumstances
January
Leah Milne	2 January	Mufrida Hayes	The wife of Julian (Robert Maskell) who discovers that he has reignited his affair with an ex-lover. Feeling lonely, she orders a takeaway from Krish Paswan's (Kammy Darweish) business, who she dated almost 40 years ago. The pair reconnect over dinner.
Julian Milne	2 January	Robert Maskell	Leah's (Mufrida Hayes) husband who has been having an affair behind her back. After being hospitalised following a holiday with his secret lover, Leah learns of his affair.
Krish Paswan	2 January	Kammy Darweish	An employee of a takeaway business. After encouragement from Al Haskey (Ian Midlane), he reconnects with his first girlfriend, Leah Milne (Hayes), when she orders from his business.
Josie Flagg	3 January	Amy Leeson	A couple who recently experienced the stillbirth of their daughter. After Eben gets a tattoo in honour of their dead child that gets infected, he falls ill.
Eben Griffith	3 January	Iwan Davies	A couple who recently experienced the stillbirth of their daughter. After Eben gets a tattoo in honour of their dead child that gets infected, he falls ill.
Superintendent Gifford	4, 10 January	Roger Morlidge	Emma Reid's (Dido Miles) colleague who tells her to ignore being outcast at work following her report of fellow colleague Matt Cassidy (Terry Mynott). In response, she threatens to quit her role as an FME.
Cindy Jaywick	4 January	Tasmin Hunt	The mother of Corey Jaywick (Alex Bullock), who attends swimming classes with Joe Granger Carmichael (Oliver Falconer). When the boiler at Joe's school breaks down, Joe's mother, Zara Carmichael (Elisabeth Dermot Walsh), calls Cindy to see if she can care for Joe while she is at work. When Cindy leaves the two boys alone, an infuriated Zara picks them both up and takes them to work with her.
Corey Jaywick	4 January	Alex Bullock	A friend of Joe Carmichael Granger's (Falconer). When the two are together, they misbehave and get into trouble.
Ethan Daniels	5 January	Freddie Palmer	A patient of Sid Vere's (Ashley Rice) who gets on well with Scarlett Kiernan (Kia Pegg). The pair agree to go on a date, but as a result of Scarlett trying to hide her poverty, she rejects Ethan's advances.
Ted Morris	5 January	Douglas McFerran	An elderly couple who have booked an expensive holiday abroad. To get Ted's appointment moved up a day so that they can go on holiday, Nadine lies to Scarlett Kiernan (Pegg) by telling her that their daughter is set to give birth and they do not want to miss it. She later discovers their lie and confronts them on their dishonesty.
Nadine Morris	5 January	Polly Kemp	An elderly couple who have booked an expensive holiday abroad. To get Ted's appointment moved up a day so that they can go on holiday, Nadine lies to Scarlett Kiernan (Pegg) by telling her that their daughter is set to give birth and they do not want to miss it. She later discovers their lie and confronts them on their dishonesty.
Susan MacGyver	9 January	Selina Brathwaite	A courier who has epilepsy. After not suffering symptoms for years, she has a seizure while driving and knocks waiter Paulo Nunes (Dinarte Gouveia) over.
Paulo Nunes	9 January	Dinarte Gouveia	A Portuguese waiter who flirts with Luca McIntyre (Ross McLaren) serves at a cafe. He is accidentally run over by Susan MacGyver (Selina Brathwaite), and after being taken into hospital by Sid Vere (Rice), he gives Sid his number to give to Luca.
PC Sunita Chaudri	9 January	Saher Shah	A police officer who is rude to Emma Reid (Miles) due to her report of Matt Cassidy (Mynott) that got him suspended.
Paramedic Alfie	9 January	Ned Cooper	A colleague of Sid Vere's (Rice).
Jess Siddhu	10–23 January	Sarah Lawrence	A bar manager who gives Scarlett Kiernan (Pegg) a job as a bartender.
Judith Marsh	10 January	Kathryn Pogson	An elderly patient of Tash Verma's (Maria Pike) whose care is taken over by Luca McIntyre (McLaren). He helps to connect Judith, who has no connection to the outer world, with neighbour Brenda Bowen (Chrissie Cotterill), who teaches Judith technological advancements.
Carly Hayes	10 January	Niamh Lynch	A shoplifter who confides in Emma Reid (Miles) that her boyfriend has been abusing her and forcing her to steal items from shops for him to sell on.
Brenda Bowen	10 January	Chrissie Cotterill	Judith Marsh's (Kathryn Pogson) neighbour who confides in her that she is lonely and has become obsessed with the online world following the death of her husband.
Rich Millar	11 January–25 April	Richard Atwill	The husband of Kirsty (Kiruna Stamell). He phones Kirsty on her first day at the Mill Health Centre, asking her to come home to sort out an argument between himself and their son, Ollie (Isaac Benn). She refuses and tells him to sort it out. After Ollie leaves to be a soldier in the army, Kirsty tells Rich that their marriage is over and that she wants him to move out. Refusing to believe they are done, he stays and tries repeatedly to rekindle their relationship. When he gets a six-month job offer in Dubai that pays well, Kirsty convinces him to take it as they agree that it will be best for the both of them.
Ollie Millar	11 January–19 October	Isaac Benn	The son of Kirsty (Stamell) and Rich (Richard Atwill). After signing a contract to join the army, he tells Rich that he no longer wants to join. However, Kirsty persuades him to go since he has signed a legal contract. He returns home weeks later with an injury to his leg, but he later confesses to damaging it purposely and going AWOL from the army due to hating it. After Rich allows him to run free from Major Frank Danvers (Lucas Hare) when he arrives at the Millar home to collect Ollie, Kirsty eventually tracks him down and has him return to the army to serve his notice. When Scarlett Kiernan (Pegg) moves in with the Millars, the two begin flirting. They begin dating and set up a social media account to prank people together. They prank Ollie's friend Tom Knight (Theo Reece), who is outraged and threatens them with police action if they decide to post the video. After Scarlett gets bored of Ollie's childish tendencies, she dumps him.
Frances Crimp	11 January	Tracey Wiles	A patient of Sid Vere's (Rice) who explains that while he performs minor surgery on her, her husband, Ken (Adam Kotz), is performing an exorcism on her since she believes the devil is in her left hand. Following the surgery, she still feels that the devil is inside of her hand and gets a knife to cut it off, until Sid gets her admitted into hospital.
Ken Crimp	11 January	Adam Kotz	The husband of Frances (Tracey Wiles) who has been going along with her religious beliefs under the impression that it has helped her, until she tries to cut her hand off.
Sophie Marr	11 January	Courtney George	A patient of Emma Reid's (Miles). After Emma diagnoses her with chlamydia and asks her to inform all prior sexual partners, Sophie shouts at her in the reception area of the Mill due to the embarrassment she has felt. Kirsty Millar (Stamell) makes her apologise and asks her to leave.
Becky Morley	12 January	Emma Rydal	The mother of Scott Charlton (Adam Little) who randomly murdered an 11-year-old girl on her way to school. She faces backlash from the local community and her colleagues.
Scott Charlton	12 January	Adam Little	A teenager who, after no signs of being a psychopath growing up, randomly murders an 11-year-old girl on her way to school.
Jo Milligan	12 January	Melissa Phillips	A colleague of Becky Morley (Emma Rydal) who outcasts her from work due to her son being a murderer.
PC Higson	12 January	Jermaine Dominique	A police officer who arrests Scott Charlton (Little) for murder.
Stella Jones	16 January	Denise Pitter	The mother of surrogate Jodie (Sadie-Jean Shirley) who attempts to convince her to raise the baby herself.
Jodie Jones	16 January	Sadie-Jean Shirley	The surrogate mother of Steve Parsons' (Gus Gordon) baby.
Steve Parsons	16 January	Gus Gordon	A gay man whose best friend, Jodie Jones (Shirley), acts as a surrogate for him to have a baby.
Alison Schofield	17 January	Anna Wilson-Hall	The mother of Nora (Lucy Abigail Wareing) who works two jobs in an attempt to feed Nora. She lies about having asthma to get an emergency appointment with Emma Reid (Miles) to get a referral for the food bank.
Nora Schofield	17 January	Lucy Abigail Wareing	A teenager who self harms due to being bullied at school.
Carl Walker	17 January	Alexander Mushore	The organiser of a food bank in Letherbridge that helps Scarlett Kiernan (Pegg) and her father Brian (Simon Lowe), as well as Alison (Anna Wilson-Hall).
Jamie Clapton	18 January–16 March	Zak Ghazi-Torbazi	A volunteer at a digital literacy course in Letherbridge, where he meets fellow volunteer Luca McIntyre (McLaren). After Luca flirts with him, Jamie gives him his phone number. The pair go on a date and later have sex. While looking in Luca's bathroom cabinet, he finds medication for Luca's HIV, which he is horrified that Luca did not mention beforehand, despite it being untransmittable. The pair rekindle their relationship when Jamie takes Luca on a date. When Luca goes to the toilet, Jamie sends him a voice note complaining about him meant for his friend, to which Luca is offended by but forgives him. The pair go on numerous dates and begin formally dating. However, when Jamie jokes about the pair still being together in 20 years' time, Luca becomes scared by the thought of such commitment and ends their relationship.
Stanley Stallworth	18 January	Richard Clews	An ex-miner who attends Jamie Clapton's (Zak Ghazi-Torbazi) digital literacy course. Bear Sylvester (Dex Lee) connects him with teenager Liv Mellor (Anna Bradley), who learns about mining from him for a school project.
Liv Mellor	18 January	Anna Bradley	A teenager who attends Jamie Clapton's (Ghazi-Torbazi) digital literacy course to complete a school project due to not having a computer or internet access at home.
Emily Mulgrave	19 January	Laura Jane Matthewson	A soft furnishings designer set to attend a job interview. On her way, she is splashed by a car and her outfit is stained. She grabs Mags Carey's (Maggie Evans) coat from a charity shop thinking it is for sale, and after discovering a suicide note in the pocket, she flees from the interview to ensure she is okay. She takes Mags to see Al Haskey (Midlane), where she explains that the note was written by her son before he killed himself.
John Huxley	19 January	Omar Ibrahim	A technician who plays Scarlett Kiernan (Pegg) and Kirsty Millar (Stamell) off against each other to cause drama and waste time on the job.
Mags Carey	19 January	Maggie Evans	A charity shop manager who is shocked to notice her coat is missing, until Emily Mulgrave (Laura Jane Matthewson) returns with it after mistakenly buying it. After Emily finds a suicide from Mags' dead son, she confides in her and Al Haskey (Midlane) that she carries it around due to not being able to move on from his death.
Carmen Philpot	23 January	Pamela Mayos	A customer at a wine bar that Zara Carmichael (Walsh) and Emma Reid (Miles) are drinking at. When she has an allergic reaction to peanut butter in one of the drinks, Zara and Emma help and call an ambulance for her.
Cheryl Green	24 January	Penny Bunton	A woman with onset dementia. When she has an episode, she abuses her family members.
Mike Green	24 January	Jim Sweeney	Cheryl's (Penny Bunton) respective husband and son who get hit by her when she has a lapse in memory.
Ruaraidh Green	24 January	Dylan Mason	Cheryl's (Penny Bunton) respective husband and son who get hit by her when she has a lapse in memory.
Carl Horton	25 January	Cory McClane	A teenager who is arrested by Tim Stringer (Brian Lonsdale) but is eventually let go.
Constable Tim Stringer	25 January	Brian Lonsdale	A constable who raises his baton to Carl Horton (Cory McClane), which is met by disgust and intervention by passer-by Birdie Wilson (Sarah Quist).
Birdie Wilson	25 January	Sarah Quist	A woman who was previously imprisoned for murdering a police officer out of fear she was going to be harmed. When she sees Tim Stringer (Lonsdale) raise his baton to Carl Horton (McClane), she intervenes.
Despatcher	25 January	Robin Johnson	A despatcher at Letherbridge Police Station.
Sarah McKenna	26 January	Danielle Saunders	A woman who learns that her father has recently committed suicide due to feeling trapped by the gambling addiction of her mother, Diane (Lisa Stevenson). When Diane keeps demanding money and is unbothered by her father's death, she leaves her.
Malcolm McKenna	26 January	Michael Yale	Sarah McKenna's (Danielle Saunders) uncle who loses his cleaning contract with Bear Sylvester (Lee). Following the death of his brother, he gains access to his cryptocurrency login and asks Sarah to charm Bear to regain his contract in exchange for the login. She attempts to renegotiate Malcolm's cleaning contract with Bear but folds and tells him about her situation, to which Bear forces Malcolm to give Sarah the login information.
Diane McKenna	26 January	Lisa Stevenson	Sarah's (Saunders) mother who has a gambling addiction. When she learns that her dead husband committed suicide due to feeling trapped by her gambling addiction and feeling that he cannot help her, she is unbothered.
Sam Owusua	30 January	Florence Williams	A police officer who, on her first solo shift, finds the dead body of Poppy Clarke's (Bethany Asher) mother. When she learns that Poppy is a fan of Emma Reid (Miles) and her radio show, Sam calls Emma's show to ask for help with the case.
Poppy Clarke	30 January	Bethany Asher	A woman with Down's syndrome who lived with her mother until her death. After not leaving the house for days, a neighbour requests a welfare check, and police officer Sam Owusua (Florence Williams) finds the dead body of Poppy's mother.
Larry Denton	31 January	Geoff Leesley	Two elderly neighbours who suffer from loneliness. When Larry does not take his health seriously, Chester forces him to see a doctor and get his feet sorted out.
Chester Mottram	31 January	Ewart James Walters	Two elderly neighbours who suffer from loneliness. When Larry does not take his health seriously, Chester forces him to see a doctor and get his feet sorted out.
February
Mark Dunham	1 February	Iain Fletcher	An entrepreneur that is accused of sexual assault by unemployed David Wheeler (Mahesh Parmar). To keep the case from affecting his reputation, he pays David to drop the case.
David Wheeler	1 February	Mahesh Parmar	An unemployed man who accuses Mark Dunham (Iain Fletcher) of sexually assaulting him. When he feels he is not believed and Mark offers him money to stay quiet, he accepts the offer.
Grant Baines	1 February	Rajat M Bose	Mark Dunham's (Fletcher) legal advisor who refuses to show Rob Hollins (Walker) dashcam footage from his car that would prove what happened between Mark and David Wheeler (Parmar).
Rachel Carleton	2 February	Lucy Lowe	The daughter of Sally Bedford (Sally Bankes) who is worried that her mother has relapsed into alcoholism when she makes major lifestyle changes.
Sally Bedford	2 February	Sally Bankes	A middle-aged woman who, after years of feeling as though she has not achieved much in life, decides to attend university to become a teacher.
Josh Palmer	2 February	Charlie Norton	A housemate and fellow student of Sally Bedford's (Bankes).
Jude Hepworth	6 February	Claire Hackett	The manager of a women's refuge. When she stands up to Libby Townsend's (Holly Georgia) abusive husband, he punches her.
Libby Townsend	6 February	Holly Georgia	A woman who has been abused by husband Paul (Anthony Lewis) for several years during their marriage. Once she gets herself and daughter Maya to a women's refuge, he tracks them down and tries to make them leave, until Libby stands up to him.
Paul Townsend	6 February	Anthony Lewis	Libby's (Georgia) abusive husband who tries to force her and daughter Maya to leave their women's refuge, until Libby attacks him with a crutch.
Mrs Brightwater	6 February	Kerry Washington	Scarlett (Pegg) and Brian Kiernan's (Lowe) landlady who is enraged when they flee her property. She tracks Scarlett down at the Mill and demands a months' rent, but Scarlett refuses and threatens to report her for ignoring the many issues with the house.
Maya	6 February	Uncredited	Libby (Georgia) and Paul's (Lewis) daughter.
Mike Price	7 February	AJ Bentley	A married couple struggling with the loss of their baby.
Meena Alam	7 February	Saroja-Lily Ratnavel	A married couple struggling with the loss of their baby.
Auntie Nicola Hanley	7 February	Rosie Ede	Rich Millar's (Atwill) aunt who visits him and Kirsty (Stamell) after going to the hairdressers. They pretend that their marriage is not over to appease her.
Mitch Buckley	9 February	Ben Abell	A couple who met through a support group for people with terminal illnesses set to get married before their deaths.
Trudy Palmer	9 February	Linette Beaumont	A couple who met through a support group for people with terminal illnesses set to get married before their deaths.
Gayle Buckley	9 February	Jane Slavin	Mitch Buckley's (Ben Abell) ex-wife who attends his party celebrating his engagement to new partner Trudy Palmer (Linette Beaumont), where she professes her feelings for him, only to be rejected.
Lynda Hamilton	20–21 February	Martha Cope	A woman claiming to be a police officer who rescues Jimmi Clay (Adrian Lewis Morgan) from under the rubble in an explosion at a medical conference. However, after Rob Hollins (Walker) is curious about her identity, she admits that she has been pretending to be an officer since she blames herself for the death of her daughter, who was an officer. Lynda explains that she took her uniform and has been wearing it in an attempt to bring positivity from her death.
George Barker	20 February	John McAndrew	A man whose wife died due to budget cuts in the NHS. To get attention from the government to fund the NHS, he bombs a medical conference and dies.
Vincent 'Vaz' Ashton	20 February	Jake Sharp	A financial planning manager who helps Al Haskey (Midlane) try to save George Barker (John McAndrew) despite him believing they should leave him to die.
Herself	20 February	Nicola Beckford	A news reporter who films a segment outside the explosion at the medical conference.
Jen Lockwood	21 February	Sabina Arthur	A grief counsellor that Daniel Granger (Chambers) hires to talk to the staff at the Mill after the explosion at the medical conference.
Mark Pardue	22 February	Dan Nicholson	Friends of Bear Sylvester (Lee). He visits them for Mark's birthday celebrations which are interrupted by bailiff Danny Marchant (Liam D Millard) who arrives to seize goods. Mark explains to Bear that Claire has gotten the couple into £178,000 debt from her gambling addiction. When she feels that Mark is not being harsh enough with her, she purposely kisses Bear in front of him to sabotage their marriage, which she later regrets.
Claire Pardue	22 February	Letitia Hector	Friends of Bear Sylvester (Lee). He visits them for Mark's birthday celebrations which are interrupted by bailiff Danny Marchant (Liam D Millard) who arrives to seize goods. Mark explains to Bear that Claire has gotten the couple into £178,000 debt from her gambling addiction. When she feels that Mark is not being harsh enough with her, she purposely kisses Bear in front of him to sabotage their marriage, which she later regrets.
Danny Marchant	22 February	Liam D Millard	A bailiff who seizes goods from Mark (Dan Nicholson) and Claire Pardue (Letitia Hector).
Lauren Katsaros	23 February	Taja Luegaezor Christian	An agency nurse who works with Sid Vere (Rice) as part of a 'return to practice' scheme after taking time off to raise her daughters. Herself and Sid find themselves attracted to each other and after some disagreements, they agree to go out for a date.
Martin Pepperall	23 February	Ian Barritt	A patient seeing Sid Vere (Rice) and Lauren Katsaros (Taja Luegaezor Christian) for a minor surgery.
Akeel Dhami	23 February	Gabeen Khan	The father of one of Joe Granger Carmichael's (Falconer) friends who accompanies his son to Joe's birthday party. He irks Zara Carmichael (Walsh) with his judgemental comments about Joe and his party.
Diane Peters	23 February	Fiona Branson	A patient seeing Sid Vere (Rice) and Lauren Katsaros (Christian) for a minor surgery.
Afree Durrani	27 February	Syreeta Kumar	A friend of Ruhma Carter's (Patel) who works with Kamil Razaq (Nitin Ganatra). Afree sets the pair up on a blind date.
Kamil Razaq	27 February	Nitin Ganatra	A man who works with Afree Durrani (Syreeta Kumar). Afree sets him up on a blind date with Ruhma Carter (Patel), who quickly realises during their date that Kamil is closeted. She advises him on what to do with coming out and his love life.
Sam Worrall	28 February	Bill Jones	A former co-worker of Scarlett Kiernan's (Pegg). He pays Pete Farnsworth (Darren Jeffries) to advise him on how to ask Scarlett out for a date, but Pete gives him misogynistic and offensive advice that angers Scarlett.
Pete Farnsworth	28 February	Darren Jeffries	A man who advertises himself as a guru for men wanting to date women. He gives Sam Worrall (Bill Jones) misogynistic and offensive advice for how to get Scarlett to date him, which results in Scarlett angrily confronting Pete.
March
Major Frank Danvers	1–2 March	Lucas Hare	An army Major that arrives at the Millar home to arrest Ollie Millar (Benn) for going AWOL.
Beth Brown	1 March	Katja Quist	A true crime podcast host who interviews Al Haskey (Midlane) and Jason Edwin (Michael Geary) for an episode involving a local murder.
Jonathan Powers	1 March	Paul Ansdell	A medical board member who worked alongside Nina Bulsara (Wendi Peters) until she announces that she is quitting the board to go back to working as a doctor. He expresses his relief after Nina quits.
Jason Edwin	1 March	Michael Geary	A publishing expert who gets interviewed by podcast host Beth Brown (Katja Quist) on a book found next to a dead body.
Jade Hunter	2 March	Arybella Eddy	A cricketer who learns that she has an injury on the ligaments in her back area. Realising that she may cause permanent damage by continuing to play, she pulls out of Giles Armstrong's (Adam Jackson-Smith) tour.
Ann Robinson	2 March	Ruth Redman	Jade Hunter's (Arybella Eddy) cricketing coach.
Giles Armstrong	2 March	Adam Jackson-Smith	A business agent who is angry to learn that Jade Hunter (Eddy) has an injury that will impact her involvement in his tour.
Mick Shelvey	6 March	Will Kenning	A builder who left his family and went missing seven years ago. After they put their family home up for sale, Mick sees the listing and books a viewing to say goodbye, not realising they still live there. He is caught by wife Sadie Shelvey (Sian Polhill-Thomas), who demands he speaks to daughter Nat Shelvey (Stella Haden). However, he runs away before she arrives.
Sadie Shelvey	6 March	Sian Polhill-Thomas	The mother of Nat (Haden) who books her in for a consultation with Zara Carmichael (Walsh) when Nat becomes obsessed with trying to find her missing father, Mick (Will Kenning). She finds Mick on a viewing in their home which she is selling, and after persuading him to see Nat, he changes his mind and runs away.
Nat Shelvey	6 March	Stella Haden	A teenager who becomes obsessed with trying to find her missing father, Mick (Kenning). He returns after seven years to see their family home but runs away before he can reunite with Nat.
Temi Adeyeye	7 March	Ike Nwachukwu	A student at Letherbridge University in his first year of nursing. After seeing Jacob Peel (Jake Simmance) and his friends bullying security guard Phil Griffiths (John McArdle) which gives Phil heart palpitations, he treats him.
Phil Griffiths	7 March	John McArdle	A security guard at Letherbridge University. He panics for the review at the end of his probation period due to upsetting student Jacob Peel (Simmance) since he reported Jacob for dealing drugs. Phil supports first year student Temi Adeyeye (Ike Nwachukwu) when he learns he has money troubles.
Jacob Peel	7 March	Jake Simmance	A student at Letherbridge University who bullies security guard Phil Griffiths (McArdle) since he reported Jacob for dealing drugs. He then tries to get Phil fired during his job review, but is exposed by Temi Adeyeye (Nwachukwu), who stands up for Phil.
Johnny Mainwaring	8 March	Riley Burgin	Two brothers living alone with Kyle acting as Johnny's legal guardian. After Suni Bulsara (Rahul Arya) sits in on their consultation with Sid Vere (Rice), he discovers that Kyle is going without food so that Johnny can eat.
Kyle Mainwaring	8 March	Billy Price	Two brothers living alone with Kyle acting as Johnny's legal guardian. After Suni Bulsara (Rahul Arya) sits in on their consultation with Sid Vere (Rice), he discovers that Kyle is going without food so that Johnny can eat.
Sergeant	8 March	Gregor Hunt	A sergeant at Ollie Millar's (Benn) army camp heard in the background of his call to Kirsty Millar (Stamell).
Constance 'Connie' Wheatley	9 March	Marji Campi	A couple who live in Clyde's one-person flat. After Connie falls ill and wants security in where she lives, the pair are referred by Al Haskey (Midlane) to get a flat for the pair of them.
Clyde Taylor	9 March	Mike Grady	A couple who live in Clyde's one-person flat. After Connie falls ill and wants security in where she lives, the pair are referred by Al Haskey (Midlane) to get a flat for the pair of them.
Laura Elliott	9 March	Fiona Paul	Connie Wheatley's (Marji Campi) daughter who disagrees of Clyde Taylor (Mike Grady), Connie's partner.
Majeera Taylor	9 March	Tazmyn-May Gebbett	A teenager who makes ageist remarks when she sees Luca McIntyre (McLaren) and Jamie Clapton (Ghazi-Torbazi) kissing in the cinema.
Damien Byrd	13–20 March	Daniel Millar	The father of a one-year-old who is staying in a bedsit after being kicked out by the baby's mother. He attends a father's group hosted by Ruhma Carter (Patel) and Sid Vere (Rice), where he pretends that everything is okay. He confides in Sid about his situation but makes out that it is Jun Li (Chike Chan) in his situation. Sid then sees Jun at the Mill and realises that it is Damien who has been kicked out. Ruhma and Sid become suspicious of Damien when he follows Jun to the Mill. Ruhma informs nearby parenting groups of him and is notified that he has joined another group under a fake name. When Sid confronts him there, Damien tries to attack Sid and leaves. Later that day, he kidnaps his son from wife Alicia (Louise Williams).
Jun Li	13–15 March	Chike Chan	A father of two children who is expecting another baby with his wife. He attends a father's group hosted by Ruhma Carter (Patel) and Sid Vere (Rice) to improve his social skills.
Matt Jackson	13 March	John Scougall	A father who is struggling to bond with his three-month-old baby due to having post-natal depression.
Lauren Wilde	13 March	Teresa Zaylor	Matt Jackson's (John Scougall) partner who suffered a stroke after giving birth to their baby.
Ben Howell	14 March	Kishore Walker	A patient of Suni Bulsara's (Arya) who is struggling to sleep due to weaning himself off of benzodiazepine without medical supervision. Suni visits the student welfare at Ben's university to secure him support.
Liz Stanton	14 March	Lisa Davina Phillip	A student welfare officer at Letherbridge University. She gets a visit from Suni Bulsara (Arya) about providing support, but after showing her stress, she visits Suni for a consultation about a pain in her arm.
Marisa Clapton	14 March	Samia Rida	Jamie's (Ghazi-Torbazi) mother who ambushes him and Luca McIntyre (McLaren) at Jamie's new house. She quizzes Luca on his intentions with dating her son and eventually gives Jamie her approval of Luca.
Dafydd Matthews	15 March	David Rees Talbot	A man from Wales who feels disconnected from his Welsh roots. When he falls ill whilst celebrating Saint David's Day, co-worker Mel Keene (Hayley Doherty) enlists Jimmi Clay's (Morgan) help to host a small party in his hospital room.
Mel Keene	15 March	Hayley Doherty	Dafydd Matthews' (David Rees Talbot) colleague who, after learning he has fallen ill whilst celebrating Saint David's Day, arranges for him to have a celebration in his hospital room.
Alicia Byrd	16–20 March	Louise Williams	The wife of Damien (Daniel Millar) who has kicked him out of their family home. He responds by kidnapping their son.
Cal Patterson	16 March	Joseph Beach	A man on the autistic spectrum who struggles socialising with people; Cal has to get help from the Mill when his grandmother, Gill (Patricia Jones), falls ill. Nina Bulsara (Peters) arrives at his home and persuades Cal to help Gil with her oxygen and supports him with making food for himself after Gill is admitted into hospital.
Gill Patterson	16 March	Patricia Jones	Cal's (Joseph Beach) grandmother who falls ill due to her history of heart problems.
Brenda Rowley	20 March	Karen Archer	Two of Scarlett Kiernan's (Pegg) first patients when she starts VPAS visits. She learns that the two are ex-best friends and helps to reconnect them.
Marie Nicholls	20 March	Penny Ryder	Two of Scarlett Kiernan's (Pegg) first patients when she starts VPAS visits. She learns that the two are ex-best friends and helps to reconnect them.
Adama Saidu	22 March	Maxine Finch	A midwife at St. Phils who is delivering her 5000th baby. However, due to keeping her newly diagnosed arthritis a secret, she cannot physically save Jade Thinball (Stephanie Siadatan) and Eli Demir's (Sam Oladeinde) baby when she stops breathing.
Jade Thinball	22 March	Stephanie Siadatan	A couple whose newborn baby stops breathing. When midwife Adama Saidu (Maxine Finch) stops CPR due to her undisclosed arthritis, they are horrified until Ruhma Carter (Patel) steps in.
Eli Demir	22 March	Sam Oladeinde	A couple whose newborn baby stops breathing. When midwife Adama Saidu (Maxine Finch) stops CPR due to her undisclosed arthritis, they are horrified until Ruhma Carter (Patel) steps in.
Dr Jerry Sutherland	23 March	Colin Blumenau	A doctor and former colleague of Daniel Granger (Chambers). Mrs Garton-Hill (Jenny Galloway) accuses Jerry of killing her husband with medication he did not need and getting into his will. However, Daniel uncovers that Jerry has been struggling with his memory and has to report him to the GMC.
Andy Robertson	23 March	Colin Brown	A patient of Dr Jerry Sutherland's (Colin Blumenau) who gives him incorrect medical advice due to his memory loss.
Mrs Garton-Hill	23 March	Jenny Galloway	A patient of Dr Jerry Sutherland's (Bleumenau) who accuses him of murdering her husband with medication he did not need.
Brett Brierly	27 March	Dimeji Ewuoso	A paramedic and friend of Bear Sylvester (Lee) who do a charity drive together to raise money for the Letherbridge Rapid Response Services. Talia Moss (Tia Richardson) steals their charity pot but eventually leads them to her sick father, veteran Clancy Moss (Rodney Earl Clarke).
Talia Moss	27 March	Tia Richardson	A teenager who steals money and sells her father's war medals in order to pay for their rent.
Clancy Moss	27 March	Rodney Earl Clarke	Talia's (Tia Richardson) father who was given a dishonourable discharge from the army and falls ill afterwards.
Bex McKenna	28 March	Helen MacFarlane	A patient of Emma Reid's (Miles) with multiple sclerosis (MS) who is trying to have a baby without a partner. Her mother, Donna (Anita Booth), learns of her attempts and initially worries that Bex's MS will stop her from mothering, but Emma persuades Donna to support Bex.
Donna McKenna	28 March	Anita Booth	Bex (Helen MacFarlane) and Sam's (Rosie Steel) mother. When she learns that Bex, who has MS, is trying for a baby, she is furious and tries to dissuade her, but eventually vows to support her.
Sam McKenna	28 March	Rosie Steel	Bex's (MacFarlane) sister who announces that she is pregnant. When she learns that Bex has been trying and failing to have her own baby and that Sam's pregnancy has upset Bex, she apologises.
Marcus Bavidge	29 March	David Ames	A man who is wrongly accused of indecent exposure by Moira Kennedy (Eileen Dunwoodie). He explains to Rob Hollins and Rachel Kelso (Imogen Khan) that he can prove she is lying since he has a prominent tattoo on his body, which Moira cannot describe.
Moira Kennedy	29 March	Eileen Dunwoodie	A woman who lives on the same street as Marcus Bavidge (David Ames) who had made several attempts to get him to move so that her relatives can live nearby. She falsely accuses him of indecent exposure and after being found guilty, she is arrested for perverting the course of justice.
PC Rachel Kelso	29 March	Imogen Khan	A police constable who assists Rob Hollins (Walker) with Marcus Bavidge (Ames) and Moira Kennedy (Dunwoodie).
Lacey James	29 March	Alice Christina Corrigan	A travel agent who has been limited to where she can travel due to her fear of getting travel vaccinations. After encouragement from Karen Hollins (Pearson) that helps her to get vaccinated, she buys Karen a travel adapter for Karen's planned cruise.
Pierre Benoit	29 March	Dan Tetsell	A man in Letherbridge who makes and sells handmade wallpaper. After he is snobby to Karen Hollins (Pearson) and demands she pays extra fees, she steals a sample from his workshop. He finds her at the Mill and demands it back.
Jonathan Lear	30 March	Lee Garrett	An emergency call handler who takes Rob Hollins' (Walker) call after he finds Karen Hollins (Pearson) dead.
Patricia Morgan	30 March	Beth Fitzgerald	Two paramedics who confirm the death of Karen Hollins (Pearson). Due to Rob Hollins (Walker) convincing himself that she is alive, he is confused why they will not help her and asks them to leave.
Elliot Stephens	30 March	Tijan Sarr	Two paramedics who confirm the death of Karen Hollins (Pearson). Due to Rob Hollins (Walker) convincing himself that she is alive, he is confused why they will not help her and asks them to leave.
Maxine Palmer	30 March	Sherise Blackman	A funeral director called by Jimmi Clay (Morgan) following Karen Hollins' (Pearson) death.
April
Jason Neale	3 April	Darryl Mundoma	A teenage footballer who visits Suni Bulsara (Arya) for therapy sessions about the relationship he has with his mother following the death of his father. When his mother pushes him to move to Scotland for career reasons, he leaves without her.
Esther Neale	3 April	Krissi Bohn	Jason's (Darryl Mundoma) mother who is saddened when he chooses to move to Scotland for career reasons without her.
Estate Agent	4 April	Sneya Rajani	An estate agent who informs Rob Hollins (Walker) that the offer he has put through on a cottage for himself and Karen (Pearson) has been accepted, weeks after her death.
Bao Zhong	5 April	Lokky Lau	A student at Letherbridge University who is struggling with his health. After downplaying his symptoms, he falls unconscious and is admitted to hospital.
Jin Chen	5 April	Steven H Li	Bao Zhong's (Lokky Lau) flatmate who is unaware that he is ill.
Janet Carey	5 April	Tania Mathurin	A support worker at Letherbridge University who, alongside Al Haskey (Midlane) rushes to Bao Zhong's (Lau) flat to check on his condition. They find him unconscious and call for am ambulance.
Ronnie Ramsay	6 April	Paul Cawley	A man who has gotten mysophobia following his wife dying from COVID-19. Due to his fear, he feels unable to attend son Justin's (Edward Mitchell) wedding. Justin's fiancé, Simon Pang (Stephen Hoo), suggests that they have the wedding outside, which Ronnie says he would be comfortable with.
Justin Ramsay	6 April	Edward Mitchell	Ronnie's (Paul Cawley) son who is marrying Simon Pang (Hoo). Due to his father's mysophobia, they agree to have the wedding outside.
Simon Pang	6 April	Stephen Hoo	Justin Ramsay's (Mitchell) fiancé who suggests that they have their wedding outside due to Justin's father having mysophobia.
Jillian Scorby	17 April	Beth Mullen	A woman with dissociative fugue who arrives at the Mill seeking help. Bear Sylvester (Lee) helps her to get into contact with sister Hannah (Georgia Burnell) and tells him about being abused by their father as a child.
Hannah Scorby	17 April	Georgia Burnell	Jillian's (Beth Mullen) sister who does not want to believe that their father abused her whilst the pair were growing up, but supports her regardless.
Jemma Dunham	18 April	Summer Strallen	A daughter and mother who go for counselling with Jimmi Clay (Morgan) due to their strained relationship with each other following Jemma moving in with Angie after Angie's stroke.
Angie Dunham	18 April	Janet Amsden	A daughter and mother who go for counselling with Jimmi Clay (Morgan) due to their strained relationship with each other following Jemma moving in with Angie after Angie's stroke.
Tres McGowan	18 April	Simon Bailey	A man who Suni Bulsara (Arya) pays to pretend to be friends with a famous rapper to impress Bear Sylvester (Lee) and Sid Vere (Rice).
Katie Seary	19 April	Heather Campbell-Ferguson	A woman who has just given birth to her and Ben Tate's (Elliot Norman) son. When midwife Malika Dahlan (Aria Prasad) notices that their relationship is strained, she uncovers that Katie has been emotionally abusing Ben.
Ben Tate	19 April	Elliot Norman	Katie Seary's (Heather Campbell-Ferguson) partner who is being emotionally abused by her.
Carrie Tate	19 April	Helen Sheals	Ben's (Norman) mother who arrives at St. Phils to see her newly-born grandchild. She informs Malika Dahlan (Prasad) that Katie Seary (Campbell-Ferguson) is abusing him.
Abir Dawoud	20 April	Shamia Chalabi	A friend of Malika Dahlan's (Prasad). When Malika's patient and Abir's friend dies, the pair of them struggle with their grief. Abir keeps her grief from her husband, Hamza (Hassan Maarfi), who eventually leaves her.
Hamza Dawoud	20 April	Hassan Maarfi	Abir's (Shamia Chalabi) husband who leaves her due to believing that she is not dedicated to their family.
Jêla Rashidi	20 April	Arazou	A friend of Abir Dawoud (Chalabi) and Malika Dahlan (Prasad). After learning that Malika is struggling with the loss of a patient, she organises for a community Iftar to lift her spirits.
Anna Kowalskaya	24 April	Kateryna Hryhorenko	A couple that have moved to Letherbridge from Poland. When Filip bursts into Anna's English lesson demanding she goes back with him, Luca McIntyre (McLaren) suspects that he is abusing Anna and phone the police. They explain to Luca that their relationship is under pressure due to having different expectations when they moved to England.
Filip Kowalski	24 April	Bart Suavek	A couple that have moved to Letherbridge from Poland. When Filip bursts into Anna's English lesson demanding she goes back with him, Luca McIntyre (McLaren) suspects that he is abusing Anna and phone the police. They explain to Luca that their relationship is under pressure due to having different expectations when they moved to England.
Jamila Adem	24 April	Natasha Bain	An English teacher at an adult learning centre. She teaches Anna Kowalskaya (Kateryna Hryhorenko) and previously taught her partner, Filip Kowalski (Bart Suavek).
Helen Macdonald	25 April	Helena Blackman	The mother of Martha Macdonald who believes that Martha is on the Autism spectrum. She pushes for Martha to be given an official diagnosis so that she can get support for her ahead of Martha joining secondary school.
Martha Macdonald	25 April	Kitty Anderson	A 10-year-old girl whose mother believes that she is on the Autism spectrum. When she is taken to see Daniel Granger (Chambers), she has a sensory overload due to not knowing that she was seeing the doctor.
Beverly Munroe	26 April–11 May	Caroline Sheen	A friend of Zara Carmichael's (Walsh) and a councillor in Letherbridge. She reveals to Scarlett Kiernan (Pegg) that housing development plans for the Beechwalk in Letherbridge have progressed more than the opposers think. She also makes a judgemental comment to Scarlett, insinuating that she could not afford one of the houses. Once people begin to oppose the environmental damage that the housing would have, Beverly pretends to care and calls off the plans in an attempt to get re-elected as a councillor.
Sue Burley	26 April	Marilyn Everett-Jones	A wheelchair user who gets trapped on a rough pavement due to cars and vans parking and trapping her inside. She has an asthma attack and is found by Emma Reid (Miles), who takes her to the Mill and checks her over. Emma helps Sue to get improved pavements by councillor Kelvin Donaldson (Peter Temple).
Lorna Mills	26 April	Yazmin Kayani	Sue Burley's (Marilyn Everett-Jones) carer.
Kelvin Donaldson	26 April	Peter Temple	A councillor who is forced by Emma Reid (Miles) and Sue Burley (Everett-Jones) to improve the pavements in Letherbridge.
Liam Cotton	27 April	Jamie Redford	A patient of Al Haskey's (Midlane) who livestreams his entire life. When Al discovers that he is streaming their consultation, he asks him to leave. However, after he tunes in and sees Liam collapse from post-concussion symptoms, he rushes to Liam's flat and saves him from death.
May
Terry Exton	1 May	Paul Usher	A married couple who see Suni Bulsara (Arya) about Terry's health. Terry, a cyclist, is told that he should not cycle due to having severe kidney issues, but ignores Suni's advice. He continues cycling and hides his issues from Julie, until he is set to collapse and goes back to the Mill with her.
Julie Exton	1 May	Louise Gold	A married couple who see Suni Bulsara (Arya) about Terry's health. Terry, a cyclist, is told that he should not cycle due to having severe kidney issues, but ignores Suni's advice. He continues cycling and hides his issues from Julie, until he is set to collapse and goes back to the Mill with her.
Ross Hutchinson	2–3 May	Robert Wilfort	A councillor who Zara Carmichael (Walsh) deceives to extract information on his development plans for the Beechwalk area in Letherbridge.
Maisie Owens	2 May	Jacqui-Lee Pryce	A midwife who Malika Dahlan (Prasad) formerly worked with who has since become a private midwife. She helps to birth Kim (Lorraine Tai) and Paul Lewis' (Jack Derges) baby.
Kim Lewis	2 May	Lorraine Tai	A married couple who do not want to birth their baby in a hospital due to fears of having the natural experience taken from them. After Kim says that she wants a complaint lodged, Malika Dahlan (Prasad) informs them that if not for the hospital and the NHS, both her and her baby could have died.
Paul Lewis	2 May	Jack Derges	A married couple who do not want to birth their baby in a hospital due to fears of having the natural experience taken from them. After Kim says that she wants a complaint lodged, Malika Dahlan (Prasad) informs them that if not for the hospital and the NHS, both her and her baby could have died.
Cora Delaney	3 May	Jennifer Sims	A friend of Luca McIntyre's (McLaren) who gives up on her sailing opportunity to salvage her relationship with boyfriend Hugh Earl (Ed White). However, after she learns that he has had sex with her best friend, Tamsin Clarke (Leah Barbara West), she takes the job offer and moves away.
Hugh Earl	3 May	Ed White	A doctor and the ex-boyfriend of Cora Delaney (Jennifer Sims). She ends their relationship after discovering that he had sex with her best friend.
Tamsin Clarke	3 May	Leah Barbara West	The best friend of Cora Delaney (Sims) who betrays her by having sex with her boyfriend.
Jo McLennon	4 May	Kellie Shirley	A family who lose their youngest child, Freddie, when he goes missing. Jo, who has agoraphobia and long-term post-natal depression, relies on son Conor to take care of the family while husband Sean works to provide for them. Conor, who takes Freddie to school, reveals to Al Haskey (Midlane) that Freddie may have taken an alternative route to school that Conor goes on to meet a drug dealer. He explains that he takes drugs due to the pressure of being so heavily relied on. Al lends support to the three members of the family and helps Freddie to be found.
Conor McLennon	4 May	George Malcher	
Sean McLennon	4 May	Gavin James	
Grant Sayles	8 May	Alun Raglan	A taxi driver who is driving Maurice Dunne (Leslie Davidoff) to Nuneaton to see Cheryl Dunne (Corrina Haycox), until Maurice dies in his car. He meets Cheryl and gives her the money from Maurice's wallet.
Ewan Sayles	8 May	Giles Whorton	Grant's (Alun Raglan) son who tricks his father into giving him money.
Cheryl Dunne	8 May	Corrina Haycox	Maurice's (Davidoff) daughter who recalls her bad relationship with her father after he has died.
Maurice Dunne	8 May	Leslie Davidoff	Cheryl's (Haycox) father who dies in Grant Sayles' (Raglan) backseat on the way to Nuneaton.
Taylor Goodbridge	9 May	Aaron Hodgetts	A teenager who fears that his lupus has returned. He tries to force Tanisha Fonesca (Andrea Ali) to give him steroids at one of her private practices, but once Bear Sylvester (Lee) learns that Sid Vere (Rice) is his GP, he gets Sid to give him an emergency appointment. Sid explains that Taylor's steroid dependency has made him have a manic episode.
Cassie Goodbridge	9 May	Gail Kemp	Taylor's (Aaron Hodgetts) mother who blames herself for not noticing Taylor's health struggles.
Lily Maynard	9 May	Harmonie Lloyd	Taylor Goodbridge's (Hodgetts) girlfriend who worries about him after watching him rob a shop.
Zo Gilbert	10 May	Grace Englert	Two eco-warriors who protest the housing development plans for the Beechwalk area. They glue themselves to trees in the area to bring attention to their cause and end up in the news.
Amir Aziz	10 May	Zain Hussain	Two eco-warriors who protest the housing development plans for the Beechwalk area. They glue themselves to trees in the area to bring attention to their cause and end up in the news.
Vincent Chapel	10 May	Gregory Cox	A spectator at the pantomime that the staff of the Mill put on to save the Beechwalk.
Nicky Woodford	11 May	Rachael Spence	The mother of Will (Jacob Partall) who has arthritis and is secretly struggling to afford to feed herself and her son. After an encounter with her ex-husband's new wife, Siobhan Sutherland (Michelle Luther), Nicky collapses and is admitted into hospital. Siobham offers to care for Will whilst she recovers.
Will Woodford	11 May	Jacob Partali	Nicky's (Rachael Spence) son who is looking forward to introducing his boyfriend to her until he learns that she has collapsed.
Siobhan Sutherland	11 May	Michelle Luther	The wife of Nicky Woodford's (Spence) ex-husband. When Nicky collapses, she confides in her that their marriage has become hostile and that she is lonely and offers to care for Nicky's son temporarily.
Professor Abid Anwar	15 May–13 June	Sartaj Garewal	A professor at Letherbridge University who interviews Zara Carmichael (Walsh) for a job as a lecturer. He is impressed by Zara's attitude towards the job and the curriculum and hires her.
Sobia Kharim	15 May	Aarushi Ganju	A researcher who lives with Hilda Jackson (Lynne Miller).
Hilda Jackson	15 May	Lynne Miller	A woman suffering from a leg ulcer. Luca McIntyre (McLaren) treats it with maggot therapy.
Sam Hare	16 May	Peter Bramhill	A man who has had a stroke without realising. He suffers from lapses in memory and timekeeping and is eventually told that he has suffered a stroke after being admitted to hospital. Darren Warner (Richard Elis) manipulates him into thinking that wife Brooke (Vanessa Hehir) does not care about him, and whilst living with Darren, he makes Sam more ill. Kirsty Millar (Stamell) realises what is happening and helps Sam to get out.
Brooke Hare	16 May	Vanessa Hehir	Sam's (Peter Bramhill) wife who leaves him due to their marital issues, not realising that he had a stroke. When she learns of his health issues, she rushes to care for Sam and apologises for not noticing the symptoms.
Darren Warner	16 May	Richard Elis	A friend of Sam Hare's (Bramhill) who makes Sam more ill after his stroke to keep his friend around.
Amy Jenson	17 May	Noeleen Comiskey	A woman whose husband has recently died. When she learns that he froze his sperm to start a family with, she becomes set on having his baby, until she learns that in the months leading up to his death, he was having an affair with Sarah Colinwood (Gloria Onitiri).
Sarah Colinwood	17 May	Gloria Onitiri	A woman who was having an affair with her colleague. She tells his grieving wife, Amy Jenson (Noeleen Comiskey), about the affair after his death.
Jez Gordon	18 May	Dan Partridge	A childhood friend of Bear Sylvester's (Lee) who contacts him under the guise that he wants to go into business with Bear. However, it transpires that Jez has a cocaine addiction that has got him into severe debt, which led to him trying to scam Bear out of thousands.
Cami Gide	18 May	Michelle Farhenheim	Jez Gordon's (Dan Partridge) partner who goes to the police about their debt issues.
Frank Watson	22 May	Simon Rouse	A man who was friends with a football coach who groomed and abused multiple children. When Andy Miller (Ashley Zhangazha), a victim, fits a carpet for him and notices a photo with his abuser on Frank's wall, he vandalises his home and car.
Andy Miller	22 May	Ashley Zhangazha	A man that was abused by his football coach as a child. When he discovers that Frank Watson (Simon Rouse), a man who he is working for, was friends with his abuser, he vandalises Frank's property. He is let off by Rob Hollins (Walker) with a police caution.
Rae Roberts	23 May	Georgia Hughes	The mother of a newborn who attends a mother's support group hosted by Malika Dahlan (Prasad) and Morna McIntyre (Natasha Calland). When she recognises Morna from a social work case being held against her, she feels uncomfortable, until she receives support from Malika. Malika realises that her son is suffering from Strep B and helps her in A&E.
Morna McIntyre	23 May	Natasha Calland	A social worker who is leading a case investigating Rae Roberts' (Georgia Hughes) capability as a mother. Malika Dahlan (Prasad) makes her realise that Rae is struggling due to having been abused, but is a capable parent.
Dr Penny Phillips	23 May	Angelina Chudi	A doctor who treats Rae Roberts' (Hughes) son. When she does not order the correct tests, she is reprimanded by Malika Dahlan (Prasad) due to her knowledge of midwifery and babies.
Chloe Fisher	24 May–19 June	Marty Breen	A student in Zara Carmichael's (Walsh) lectures. She picks up on classmate Miles Bailey's (Louis Saxby) crush on Zara and teases him. When she sees Miles kiss Zara, she takes a video and uses it to expose Zara online.
Diana Gray	24 May	Jenni Keenan Green	The daughter of Barbara (Alison Peebles) and a student in Zara Carmichael's (Walsh) lectures. She is disgusted when she learns that whilst in her care home, she had a man expose his genitals to her. When care home manager Donald Tunnell (Edward Baker-Duly) does not do anything, Diana takes Barbara out of the care home.
Barbara Gray	24 May	Alison Peebles	An elderly woman who lives in a care home. Whilst there, she had a man expose his genitals to her, so daughter Diana (Jenni Keenan Green) takes her home to live with her.
Donald Tunnell	24 May	Edward Baker-Duly	A care home manager who Diana Gray (Green) accuses of being misogynistic.
Tom Knight	24 May	Theo Reece	Ollie Millar's (Benn) friend who is outraged when Ollie and Scarlett pull a prank on him for their social media account. He threatens them with police action if they decide to post the video of him.
Jay Davis	25 May	Frances Nunnery	A patient of Jimmi Clay's (Morgan). His foster sister, Nadja Bartosz (Ema Cavolli), discovers that his new girlfriend, Beth Hull (Leah Gayer), has been stalking and photographing him.
Nadja Bartosz	25 May	Ema Cavolli	Jay Davis' (Frances Nunnery) foster sister. She exposes Beth Hull (Gayer) for stalking and photographing Jay, which leads to Beth attacking her.
Beth Hull	25 May	Leah Gayer	A student in Jay Davis' (Nunnery) university class. She stalks and photographs him, which leads to his foster sister, Nadja Bartosz (Cavolli), exposing her. She attacks Nadja and hopes to cover up her crimes, but is exposed and held in police custody.
Adrian Dixon	30 May	Tyrese Eaton-Dyce	A teenager who has been brought into St. Phils Hospital after being found lying unconscious in the street. After he suffers from memory loss following a violent altercation with George Roach (Luca Marandola), Rob Hollins (Walker) reveals that George is dead.
George Roach	30 May	Luca Marandola	A teenager who dies after a fight with Adrian Dixon (Tyrese Eaton-Dyce).
Dr Patrick Ngoni	30 May	Offue Okegbe	A doctor at St. Phils Hospital who treats Adrian Dixon (Eaton-Dyce).
Jordan Hanigan	31 May	Ben Greenhough	The brother of Meela (Kelcie Atkinson) who is concerned that she is a werewolf. He is relieved when she is diagnosed with premenstrual dysphoric disorder (PMDD).
Meela Hanigan	31 May	Kelcie Atkinson	A teenager who is diagnosed with PMDD after displaying symptoms including bad moods and a hunger for raw meat.
Carol Hanigan	31 May	Jessica Hall	The mother of Jordan (Ben Greenhough) and Meela (Atkinson).
June
Bernadette Hilsum	1 June	Kim Hartman	An elderly woman showing signs of dementia. Scarlett Kiernan (Pegg) visits her as part of the vulnerable patient assessment scheme (VPAS) and Bernadette confuses her for someone who wants money. Scarlett and Suni Bulsara (Arya) work out that Rachel Arbor (Eleanor Hafner) is posing as her daughter to scam her.
Rachel Arbor	1 June	Eleanor Hafner	A woman posing as Bernadette Hilsum's (Kim Hartman) daughter to get money from her.
Margaret Earl	1 June	Georgie Rhys	People living on Bernadette Hilsum's (Hartman) street who are concerned about her signs of dementia.
Charlotte Smith	1 June	Georgia Neath	People living on Bernadette Hilsum's (Hartman) street who are concerned about her signs of dementia.
Andrea Gardner	5 June	Dido Miles	A famous actress who portrayed a lead character on a sci-fi series in the 1990s. Whilst attending a fan convention, she ingests prescription drugs and alcohol and falls as a result, breaking her ankle. Due to looking identical to Emma Reid (also Miles), she takes Andrea's place in a Q&A session.
Leigh Campbell-Jones	5 June	Martin Cooper	Husbands who are attending a fan convention to meet Andrea Gardner (Miles). When Andrea breaks her ankle, they help Emma Reid (also Miles) to transform into Andrea due to looking identical. They later ask Andrea if she would be part of their own cruise ship convention.
Bellamy Campbell-Jones	5 June	Ashley Campbell	Husbands who are attending a fan convention to meet Andrea Gardner (Miles). When Andrea breaks her ankle, they help Emma Reid (also Miles) to transform into Andrea due to looking identical. They later ask Andrea if she would be part of their own cruise ship convention.
Nita Kunda	5 June	Yasmin Barn	An events organiser at a fan convention.
Hannah Nicholls	6 June	Jessica Boyde	A patient of Malika Dahlan's (Prasad) who gives birth to a baby girl. Her other daughter, Sophie Nicholls (Maisie Wharton), is still mourning the loss of Hannah's dead son, and is upset when Hannah does not give birth to a boy.
Sophie Nicholls	6 June	Maisie Wharton	The daughter of Hannah (Jessica Boyde) who is still mourning the loss of her dead brother. Due to believing that he will be reincarnated as Hannah's new child, she is upset when she gets a baby sister.
Georgia Parry	7 June	Becky Easen	The neighbour of a woman named Nancy, who died months prior to her realising that she had not noticed her around.
Cameron Clarke	7 June	Dominic Allen	The estranged son of Nancy, who is unmoved when Rob Hollins (Walker) informs him that she has died.
Faduma Ahmed	7 June	Afia Abusham	A woman who is upset by the death of Nancy, due to her caring for Faduma as a child and bringing her to England.
Barney Phelps	8 June	Mark Murphy	A lorry driver who arrives at the Campus Surgery feeling too ill to drive to Inverness. Receptionist Rosie Colton (Janice Connolly) insists to Al Haskey (Midlane) that his condition is urgent and she is proved correct when Al realises that Barney needs an ambulance.
Penelope Richards	8 June	Hazel Ellerby	The former neighbour of Rosie Colton (Connolly). Rosie believes she has leishmaniasis. However, Al Haskey (Midlane) sees her and works out that she just has a bad case of acne.
Laura Richards	8 June	Olivia Dowd	The daughter of Penolope (Hazel Ellerby) and former neighbour of Rosie Colton (Connolly).
Deep Jakhur	12 June	Shahbaaz Khan	A couple who were recently married through arranged marriage. Both are shocked to learn that they have herpes. They both confess to one another that a week prior to their wedding, they were both individually nervous about having sex for the first time and had sex with other people to prepare, where they both contracted herpes.
Priyanka Jakhur	12 June	Ambika Sharma	A couple who were recently married through arranged marriage. Both are shocked to learn that they have herpes. They both confess to one another that a week prior to their wedding, they were both individually nervous about having sex for the first time and had sex with other people to prepare, where they both contracted herpes.
Josh Keiffer	12 June	Tom Ross-Williams	Priyanka Jakhur's (Ambika Sharma) best friend who helped her to learn about having sex by having sex with her.
Ness Azimi	13 June	Eden Jodie	A cisgender patient of Luca McIntyre's (McLaren) who is mistaken for a trans woman by Tim Small (Jason Furnival). Tim makes transphobic comments to Ness when he sees her leave the women's toilets, intrudes in Ness' consultation and pulls down her trousers. She later arrives at his house and has him arrested for assault.
Tim Small	13 June	Jason Furnival	A transphobic patient at the Campus Surgery who mistakes Ness Azimi (Eden Jodie) for a trans woman. He makes transphobic comments to Ness when he sees her leave the women's toilets, intrudes in Ness' consultation and pulls down her trousers. He is later arrested.
Nik Laverick	14 June	Evan Milton	A man who stabs his boyfriend after being abused by him. Due to unsympathetic FME Dan Dobbin (Christopher Wright) not questioning him about being abused, he is arrested.
Dan Dobbin	14 June	Christopher Wright	An FME who Emma Reid (Miles) hates. When he oversees Nik Laverick's (Evan Milton) case, Emma points out that Nik has been abused and that Dan should question him more sensitively. However, Dan claims he is doing what his job description entails, angering Emma due to his lack of sympathy for Nik.
Karl Howard	15 June	Jeff Bennett	A married couple who used to dance together and earned national awards. After Karl has a stroke, he has to stop all physical activity. Sheila begins dancing in secret with Tony Berg (Brooks Livermore), but Karl believes they are having an affair and punches Tony. He learns that Tony is gay and that their relationship is merely professional.
Sheila Howard	15 June	Emma Cater	A married couple who used to dance together and earned national awards. After Karl has a stroke, he has to stop all physical activity. Sheila begins dancing in secret with Tony Berg (Brooks Livermore), but Karl believes they are having an affair and punches Tony. He learns that Tony is gay and that their relationship is merely professional.
Tony Berg	15 June	Brooks Livermore	Sheila Howard's (Emma Cater) new dance partner who is punched by her husband, Karl (Jeff Bennett), who believes they are having an affair. Tony clears up his suspicions by confirming that he is gay and the two befriend each other.
Stephen Royle	19 June	Paul Haley	The sick father of Janine (Lucille Howe). On her first VPAS visit, Kirsty Millar (Stamell) discovers that Janine is having difficulty caring for Stephen, due to the death of her sister who used to care for him.
Janine Royle	19 June	Lucille Howe	The daughter of Stephen (Paul Haley) who feels inadequate in caring for him. She explains to Kirsty Millar (Stamell) that her sister, who died of breast cancer, did a great job of caring for Stephen and she cannot compare. Kirsty arranges for support for the pair.
Sam Nathans	20–21 June	Jamie Bacon	A boxer who takes part in Baz's (Matt Slack) charity boxing match to raise money to find a kidney for his daughter. He has believed for his entire life that Mick (Matt Selby) is his father, but is shocked when mother Terri (Samantha Lane) reveals that Mick's brother, Baz, raped her. Sam punches Baz when he discovers that he is his father.
Terri Nathans	20–21 June	Samantha Lane	Sam's (Jamie Bacon) mother who, when he needs a donor for his daughter, reveals that his supposed father is actually his uncle. She explains that she was raped by Baz (Slack) and that she did not want to tell anybody.
Ree Nathans	20–21 June	Martha Godber	Sam's (Bacon) wife who is worried about finding a donor for their daughter.
Baz Nathans	20–21 June	Matt Slack	Sam's (Bacon) real father and the owner of a boxing gym. When Sam discovers that Baz raped his mother, he punches him in the nose, leading Nina Bulsara (Peters) to break up the fight.
Mick Nathans	20–21 June	Matt Selby	The brother of Baz (Slack) who is ill and unaware that Baz raped his wife, Terri (Lane), which led to the birth of Sam (Bacon).
Bev McAdams	22 June	Debra Penny	The mother of twins Michelle (Shona Eaton) and Patrick (Adam Lawrence) who is rushed to hospital when her COPD gets worse. She learns that her children are fighting over a do not resuscitate (DNR) order left in her dead husband's medical notes and confesses that she discussed the order with him and his doctor.
Michelle McAdams	22 June	Shona Eaton	Twins who blame each other for their father dying due to a DNR order. They are shocked to learn that their mother, Bev, discussed the DNR with their father prior to his death, and got the doctor to sign it.
Patrick McAdams	22 June	Adam Lawrence	Twins who blame each other for their father dying due to a DNR order. They are shocked to learn that their mother, Bev, discussed the DNR with their father prior to his death, and got the doctor to sign it.
September
Serena Bradley	4 September	Tisha Merry	A woman that Bear Sylvester (Lee) was friends with benefits with. She turns up at the bowling alley where Bear is on a date with Claudia Briant (Deen), prompting Claudia to get jealous about his admiration for Serena.
Mickey Gilmore	5 September	Bill Ward	A man that Ruhma Carter (Patel) meets at the adult learning centre. Due to being charmed by him, Ruhma decides to take pottery with him rather than doing a Spanish class. He invites her out on a date after flirting with Ruhma throughout the class, which she rejects after learning he is married.
Henry Povall	6 September	James Cartmell	A 16-year-old who is living alone after the death of his alcoholic and depressed father. He attends a therapy session with Suni Bulsara (Arya) which is interrupted by his estranged mother, Alison Pickering (Rebecca Bainbridge).
Alison Pickering	6 September	Rebecca Bainbridge	The estranged mother of Henry Povall (James Cartmell) who arrives to take care of him following the death of his father.
Vic Butt	7–13 September	Neil Sheffield	Frankie Sharp's (Andrea Mason) husband who defends her following her aggressive behaviour towards Scarlett Kiernan (Pegg). He helps Frankie to attack Al Haskey (Midlane).
Ryan Scott	7 September	Tom Claxton	Three roommates at Letherbridge University. Stuart blames Ryan for everything going wrong in his life, including him beginning a relationship with Jess, since he is attracted to her. Stuart visits Jimmi Clay (Morgan) for a consultation but pretends to be Stuart. He later tampers with the breaks on Ryan's bike and locks Jess in his bedroom, but he is stopped before anything can happen.
Stuart Norman	7 September	Jack Maddison	Three roommates at Letherbridge University. Stuart blames Ryan for everything going wrong in his life, including him beginning a relationship with Jess, since he is attracted to her. Stuart visits Jimmi Clay (Morgan) for a consultation but pretends to be Stuart. He later tampers with the breaks on Ryan's bike and locks Jess in his bedroom, but he is stopped before anything can happen.
Jess Haig	7 September	Mei Henri	Three roommates at Letherbridge University. Stuart blames Ryan for everything going wrong in his life, including him beginning a relationship with Jess, since he is attracted to her. Stuart visits Jimmi Clay (Morgan) for a consultation but pretends to be Stuart. He later tampers with the breaks on Ryan's bike and locks Jess in his bedroom, but he is stopped before anything can happen.
Chris Padmore	11 September	Andy Linden	The grandfather of Logan (Dan Tiernan) and an infamous conman. He does not want the same life for Logan and discourages him from stealing when he catches him trying to steal a watch.
Logan Padmore	11 September	Dan Tiernan	The grandson of Chris (Andy Linden), an infamous conman. Wanting to be like him and to impress him, he tries and fails to steal an expensive watch from a jewellery shop.
Mervyn Golightly	11 September	Keith Hyland	A street cleaner who enlists Sid Vere (Rice) for help when he sees Logan Padmore (Tiernan) having an asthma attack.
Hugo Crowley	12 September, 3 October	Andrew Loudon	A friend of Daniel Granger's (Chambers) who invites him for a drink at the golf club. After Daniel drinks and drives with his son in the car and Zara Carmichael (Walsh) demands they split up and he moves out, Hugo tells Daniel to fight for his family and life.
Bridget Maher	12 September	Marion O'Dwyer	A woman who arrives at St. Phils wanting information on her long-lost daughter. Lisa Gillespie (Milly Zero) risks her job by giving Bridget her name.
Lisa Gillespie	12 September	Milly Zero	An employee at St. Phils who helps Bridget Maher (Marion O'Dwyer) with information on her long-lost daughter. Ruhma Carter (Patel) orders Bridget to be escorted out of the building before Lisa can give Bridget the file on her daughter, but Lisa catches her up and tells her the name. She reveals that she is adopted herself and wanted to help someone in a similar situation.
Vanessa Ormonde	12 September	Kara Lane	A woman at a golf club who flirts with Daniel Granger (Chambers).
Trudy Larson	13 September	Rachael Hilton	A comic book shop employee that Al Haskey (Midlane) goes on a date with. After hitting it off, the pair arrange a second date.
PC Mandy Cox	14 September	Melissa Jacques	A police constable who finds that Daniel Granger (Chambers) is driving despite being over the drink driving limit. After she learns that he is driving to the hospital to visit Al Haskey (Midlane) after he has been attacked, she agrees to not take legal action since Al treats her mother.
Derek Whitaker	18 September	Gary Lilburn	Two neighbours who get hold of Jake Davis' (Haroun Al Jeddal)
Gerry Cooper	18 September	Marilyn Cutts	Two neighbours who get hold of Jake Davis' (Haroun Al Jeddal)
Jake Davis	18 September	Haroun Al Jeddal	A drug dealer who realises that Derek Whitaker (Gary Lilburn) has gotten hold of his drugs and demands them back.
Danny Tavener	19 September	Joshua Glenister	A man that Luca McIntyre (McLaren) hooked-up with. He falls off his bike whilst delivering food and while Luca treats his injury, his bike is stolen. Luca helps him to track the bike down from thief Mason Sands (Alfie Middlemiss).
Mason Sands	19 September	Alfie Middlemiss	A thief who steals Danny Tavener's (Joshua Glenister) bike, amongst others, to provide for his daughter.
Casey Greer	20 September	Lauren Foster	An old school friend of Scarlett Kiernan's (Pegg) that dropped out of school and became unreachable after having a child. Scarlett helps Casey to get out of exempt accommodation and reconcile with her father, Mark (Jack Whitam).
Mark Greer	20 September	Jack Whitam	Casey's (Lauren Foster) father who arrives at the Mill demanding she leaves with him. Scarlett Kiernan (Pegg) becomes concerned and involves the police, before she realises that him taking Casey back to his home would be the best option for her.
Tyler Douglas	20 September	Ollie Cox	A security guard at an exempt accommodation where Casey Greer (Foster) and Sasha Pearson (Rebecca Fuller) are staying. He forces them to attend parties and be rented out as sex workers, before he is arrested.
Sasha Pearson	20 September	Rebecca Fuller	A drug addict at an exempt accommodation. Security guard Tyler Douglas (Ollie Cox) forces her to attend parties and work as a sex worker.
Martin Villiers	21 September	Dominic Taylor	A golfer who spends the day with Daniel Granger (Chambers) at his golf club. His brother, Paul Broughton (Paul Lacoux) arrives to protest water waste and after a fight with him, Paul has two cardiac arrests and dies. He admits his regret about always fighting with Paul to Daniel.
Paul Broughton	21 September	Paul Lacoux	A climate change activist who arrives at brother Martin Villiers' (Dominic Taylor) golf club to protest water waste. After a fight with Martin, he has two cardiac arrests and dies.
Eric Pathway	26 September	Maxwell Hutcheon	A doctor who assists Bear Sylvester (Lee) on his VPAS assessment day. His sharp attitude angers both Bear and patient Jacqueline Owusu (Vivienne Rochester).
Jacqueline Owusu	26 September	Vivienne Rochester	A patient of Bear Sylvester's (Lee) who is becoming too unwell to continue living on her own.
George Fulton	27 September	Peter Caulfield	A delivery driver who loses contact with his son after coming out as gay.
Kayden Reece	27 September	Bunmi Osasolor	George Fulton's (Peter Caulfield) co-worker who is friends with his son. He uses George's lost contact with his son as a way to manipulate him into doing his work for him.
Michelle Jones	27 September	Molly Hanson	A pregnant patient of Ruhma Carter's (Patel) who has discovered her husband is gay.
Ray Farrell	28 September	Ian Burfield	A builder that hears the voice of his mother who abused him as a child.
Roly Harris	28 September	Sean Croke	Ray Farrell's (Ian Burfield) cousin who is shocked to learn that his aunt abused Ray as a child.
Ray's Mother	28 September	Toni Midlane	The voice of Ray Farrell's (Ian Burfield) mother that he hears in his mind.
October
Mark Elswick	2 October	Alistair Lock	A patient at St. Phils who is seen by Suni Bulsara (Arya) after sleeping homeless and getting a concussion.
Elaine Garner	2 October	Zoe Matthews	Mark Elswick's (Alistair Lock) mother.
Dr Nicholas Stevenson	2 October	Marcus Hutton	A consultant at St. Phils who wants to free up beds.
Kat Webster	3 October	Alison Senior	A family who struggle in coping with the aftermath of Molly being diagnosed with early-onset psychosis.
Molly Webster	3 October	Leah Mulchay	A family who struggle in coping with the aftermath of Molly being diagnosed with early-onset psychosis.
Beth Webster	3 October	Emily Drewett	A family who struggle in coping with the aftermath of Molly being diagnosed with early-onset psychosis.
Andy Logan	4 October	Peter Stone	A missing person who parks outside of the Campus Surgery. Scarlett Kiernan (Pegg) finds out that he left his family after the death of his daughter and persuades him to go back and make amends.
Rachel Carcross	5 October	Boni Adeliyi	Two architecture students who connect when Rachel confronts Barney over his cough, not knowing he is in recovery from chemotherapy. The two begin a relationship.
Barney Hammond	5 October	Will Cross	Two architecture students who connect when Rachel confronts Barney over his cough, not knowing he is in recovery from chemotherapy. The two begin a relationship.
Pete Hope	5 October	Lewis Edgar	Barney Hammond's (Will Cross) friend who uses Barney's cancer as a way to impress women.
Lily Madden	9 October	Grace Hogg-Robinson	A teenager who is unhappy with a mole on her face. Despite Sid Vere (Rice) informing her that the mole is not cancerous, she wants it removed and soon self-harms.
Jade Madden	9 October	Charlotte Asprey	Lily's (Grace Hogg-Robinson) mother, who is concerned when she learns that Lily has been self-harming.
Tilda McKinley	9 October	Eden Ottman	Lily Madden's (Hogg-Robinson) friend, who finds her bleeding after she self-harms.
Jemma Latham	10 October	Lori Barker	A woman with sickle cell disease who misses appointments for a clinical trial, which alarms Kirsty Millar (Stamell). Kirsty discovers that Jemma is pregnant with the baby of her boss, Dario Riva (Fabrizio Santino).
Dario Riva	10 October	Fabrizio Santino	The boss of Jemma Latham (Lori Barker). He discovers that she is pregnant with his baby.
Milo Griffin	10 October	Jason Rivers	A patient of Suni Bulsara's (Arya) who has health anxiety. He gets into an overemotional state and locks himself in Suni's office and requires Scarlett Kiernan (Pegg) to coax him out.
Shona Richards	11 October	Alice Sykes	A woman who is stalked by landlord Zachary Lewis (Al Bollands). She initially assumes it is ex-boyfriend Matt Kelshall (Michael Lyle), until Zachary takes her hostage.
Zachary 'Lew' Lewis	11 October	Al Bollands	Shona Richards' (Alice Sykes) landlord who becomes obsessed with her, stalks her and takes her hostage.
Matt Kelshall	11 October	Michael Lyle	Shona Richards' (Sykes) ex-boyfriend who is accused of stalking her.
Olivia Dean	12 October	Catrin Stewart	A couple whose baby has died inside of Olivia at 37 weeks. The pair of them decide to split days prior to the stillbirth, until Ruhma Carter (Patel) reunites them.
Ben Rinsler	12 October	Mateo Oxley	A couple whose baby has died inside of Olivia at 37 weeks. The pair of them decide to split days prior to the stillbirth, until Ruhma Carter (Patel) reunites them.
Gavin Moore	12 October	Marson Francisco	A man who gives Ben Rinsler (Mateo Oxley) his chocolate bar when Olivia Dean (Catrin Stewart) craves it.
Tina Hanson	16 October	Suzanne Proctor	A mother and son who share disordered eating habits. They agree to get help together.
Max Hanson	16 October	Jamie Nisbet	A mother and son who share disordered eating habits. They agree to get help together.
Reece Shaw	16 October	Mohammed Sheblu Miah	A food delivery driver who finds Al Haskey (Midlane) strange for wanting his pizza left on the doorstep.
Tim Walker	17 October	Aedan Duckworth	A man who feels flu-like symptoms after having an orgasm. Luca McIntyre (McLaren) gets to the bottom of his condition and finds out that he has postorgasmic illness syndrome.
Aoife Roche	17 October	Clíona Flynn	Tim Walker's (Aedan Duckworth) girlfriend who believes that he is breaking up with her when he explains that he feels ill after sex.
Niamh Kennedy	17 October	Hannah Morrison	Aoife Roche's (Clíona Flynn) best friend who tries to get back with her ex and Aoife's boyfriend, Tim Walker (Duckworth), since she is secretly pregnant with his baby.
Mike Gorman	18 October	Morgan Jones	A habitual offender who is not believed by police officers when he claims to have been robbed of a diamond necklace. He later realises that Aaron May (Tom Clegg) stole it.
Melanie Gorman	18 October	Eiry Hughes	Mike's (Morgan Jones) wife who does not believe that he has gotten her a diamond necklace.
Aaron May	18 October	Tom Clegg	A man who steals Mike Gorman's (Jones) necklace.
Mei-Li Griffiths	19 October	Choy-Ling Man	A colleague of Ruhma Carter's (Patel) who upsets Ruhma when she reveals that she is taking early retirement from the NHS.
Hannah Adair	19 October	Lily Grace Robinson	A teenager who compulsively lies to make people interested in her. She claims to Sadie Matthews (Kyiah Ashton) that Jimmi Clay (Morgan) molested her and Sadie makes her go to the police. Hannah's mother, Debs (Jennifer Matter), debunks Hannah's lies and makes her admit the truth.
Debs Adair	19 October	Jennifer Matter	Hannah's (Lily Grace Robinson) mother who is disgusted with her compulsive lies. She tells her to start telling the truth otherwise she will have to move out.
Sadie Matthews	19 October	Kyiah Ashton	A student at Letherbridge University who discovers that Hannah Adair (Robinson) has lied about being molested. She is disgusted due to having recently been sexually assaulted and shuns her.
Betty Powell	23 October	Anita Graham	Two former brownies who sit with and help Eve Haskey (Rachel Bell) after she has a fall.
Pat Colbert	23 October	Jeanette Rourke	Two former brownies who sit with and help Eve Haskey (Rachel Bell) after she has a fall.
Harbinda Chabra	23 October	Shivam Pallana	An ambulance dispatcher who sends out an ambulance for Eve Haskey (Bell) in Bedford. When her son, Al (Midlane), realises that there is a long wait for an ambulance, he has an outburst to Harbinda over the phone. He later apologises to Harbinda for his anger.
Sheena McDonald	24 October	Joanne Farrell	The extremely religious Christian mother of Grace (Imogen Woodward). She becomes indoctrinated by online religious figures and begins being strict with Grace, which leads her to threaten to move out and live with her father.
Grace McDonald	24 October	Imogen Woodward	The daughter of Sheena (Joanne Farrell), an extremely religious Christian. When Sheena tries to stop her from taking contraception to regulate her periods due to feeling it lacks purity, Grace threatens to move out and live with her father instead.
Bill Reaney	24 October	Andrew Westfield	A patient of Zara Carmichael's (Walsh) who needs a prostate examination. As Zara is preparing to inspect him, Rosie Colton (Connolly) walks in without knocking, embarrassing Bill and infuriating Zara.
Alison Pullin	24 October	Lauren Dickenson	A teacher at Joe Carmichael Granger's (Falconer) school who reprimands Zara for taking him to New York City during term time.
Christine Barker-Smith	25 October	Emma Cunniffe	A midwife who falls asleep in her car due to exhaustion. Co-worker Ruhma Carter (Patel) finds her and gives her instructions on what to do about her tiredness.
Gareth Martin	25 October	Conor Neaves	A couple who have a home birth assisted by midwives Ruhma Carter (Patel) and Christine Barker-Smith (Emma Cunniffe).
Lorraine Hartley	25 October	Emma Prendergast	A couple who have a home birth assisted by midwives Ruhma Carter (Patel) and Christine Barker-Smith (Emma Cunniffe).
Helen Curran	26 October	Sally Womersley	A woman who is struggling to adjust in being a carer to her husband, Eddie (Anthony Wise). Her sister, former matron Joyce Kilter (Carolyn Pickles), steps in to take care of Eddie until Helen feels that she is capable of helping.
Eddie Curran	26 October	Anthony Wise	The dying husband of Helen (Sally Womersley). He dislikes her sister, former matron Joyce Kilter (Pickles), but accepts help from her in his dying days since he wants to relieve Helen's struggles.
Joyce Kilter	26 October	Carolyn Pickles	A former matron and the sister of Helen Curran (Womersley). She is renowned for being strict whilst caring for people.
Noah Johnson	30 October	James Arden	A man on a first date with Adam Asher (Joshua Griffin). Once he goes outside, he finds Adam being mugged and stabbed. He tries to help with a witness statement but Emma Reid (Miles) learns that he has prosopagnosia and cannot recall people's faces.
Adam Asher	30 October	Joshua Griffin	A man on a first date with Noah Johnson (James Arden). He is mugged once he goes outside to vape.
Martine Toole	30 October–15 November	Laura Girling	A woman that Tye Vere (Daniel Hill) meets in a club and soon becomes attracted to. He takes her back to Sid Vere's (Rice) house later that night and the pair share a brief relationship.
Albie Swinton	31 October	Hugh Stubbins	Three fictional characters from a collection of short horror stories that frighten Luca McIntyre (McLaren), Emma Reid (Miles) and Sid Vere (Rice) in nightmares.
Vincent Walberswick	31 October	Gregory A Smith	Three fictional characters from a collection of short horror stories that frighten Luca McIntyre (McLaren), Emma Reid (Miles) and Sid Vere (Rice) in nightmares.
Sid-Sid	31 October	Dre Johnson	Three fictional characters from a collection of short horror stories that frighten Luca McIntyre (McLaren), Emma Reid (Miles) and Sid Vere (Rice) in nightmares.
November
Gabby Birch	1 November	Aimee Cassettari	A patient of Luca McIntyre's (McLaren) who thinks that she was spiked by her ex-boyfriend, Ash. However, she learns that fiancé Hugo Rawson (David Albury) got her friend to spike her so that she would not cheat on him with Ash.
Hugo Rawson	1 November	David Albury	Gabby Birch's (Aimee Cassettari) protective fiancé who gets Jenna Cox (Lauryn Redding) to spike her. She dumps him once she learns what he has done.
Jenna Cox	1 November	Lauryn Redding	Gabby Birch's (Cassettari) friend who spiked her on a night out after being asked by Hugo Rawson (Albury).
Lula Carmine	2 November	Carla Mendonça	A renowned yoga teacher at a silent retreat visited by Jimmi Clay (Morgan).
Lewis Darby	2 November	Tim Treloar	A man visiting the same silent retreat as Jimmi Clay (Morgan). He aggravates Jimmi by eating and snoring loudly.
Lucy Murphy	2 November	Alicia Charles	Guests visiting the same silent retreat as Jimmi Clay (Morgan).
Luke Brett	2 November	Ben Turner	Guests visiting the same silent retreat as Jimmi Clay (Morgan).
Lisa Caldwell	6 November	Amy Cudden	The mother of Jacob (Jordan Billings). She takes him to see Suni Bulsara (Arya) since he struggles to concentrate and he is forwarded for an assessment for psychosis.
Jacob Caldwell	6 November	Jordan Billings	A teenager who is suspended from school due to misbehaving. However, Suni Bulsara (Arya) notices that he likely has a form of psychosis that causes his behaviour.
John Matthews	6 November	Anthony Cozens	Jacob Caldwell's (Billings) teacher who suspends him after believing he is misbehaving. However, after he learns that Jacob has a mental health condition, he reverses his decision and vows to support him.
Jodie Brewer	7 November	Kate Spencer	A woman who has been made redundant from the local post office after 17 years of service. She becomes vulnerable and is ordered by true crime influencer Marty Naylor (Paul McQuaid) to get videos of Laura Cropper (Lelda Kapsis), a woman who bears resemblance to a famous baby killer.
Laura Cropper	7 November	Lelda Kapsis	A New Zealand expatriate who bears resemblance to a famous baby killer. Neighbour Jody Brewer (Kate Spencer) believes she is the criminal and briefly takes her baby to keep the child safe.
Marty Naylor	7 November	Paul McQuaid	A true crime influencer who takes advantage of Jody Brewer (Spender) by getting her to take videos of Laura Cropper (Kapsis), a woman who looks like a famous baby killer.
Tina Evans	8 November	Eliza Williams	A pregnant patient who sees Ruhma Carter (Patel) and Jenny Ackerman (Lous Pearson). New midwife Jenny worries Tina when she cannot find a foetal heartbeat during her scan.
Amy Jones	8 November	Su Douglas	A patient who is messaged by Kirsty Millar (Stamell) to say she has vascular dementia, who has accidentally messaged everyone on the system with the surname Jones. She is found by cleaner Lauren Colson (April Nerissa Hudson), who takes her to the Mill to see a doctor. Sid Vere (Rice) confirms that she has labyrinthitis.
Lauren Colson	8 November	April Nerissa Hudson	A cleaner who goes to clean Amy Jones' (Su Douglas) house. She finds her worried over an accidental message from the Mill talking about a dementia diagnosis. Lauren takes her to the doctors, where her fears are calmed.
Sophia Artino	9–20 November	Barbara D'Alterio	A therapist who sees Al Haskey (Midlane) after being attacked. Her session accidentally inspires Al to begin working from home due to his fear of leaving the house. However, she soon talks him into leaving the house and going back to work.
Brandon Gordon	9 November	Max Pemberton	A son and mother who attend a counselling session with Jimmi Clay (Morgan). Pam is worried about Brandon's anger issues after he attacked a fellow pupil. Pam also reveals that Brandon watches videos posted by a toxic social media influencer who has indoctrinated him into being misogynistic. Brandon holds resentment towards her since she got a breast enlargement surgery and brands her a skank, upsetting Pam.
Pam Gordon	9 November	Ruby Snape	A son and mother who attend a counselling session with Jimmi Clay (Morgan). Pam is worried about Brandon's anger issues after he attacked a fellow pupil. Pam also reveals that Brandon watches videos posted by a toxic social media influencer who has indoctrinated him into being misogynistic. Brandon holds resentment towards her since she got a breast enlargement surgery and brands her a skank, upsetting Pam.
Anne Richards	13 November	Elinor Coleman	A couple who are anxiously awaiting the birth of their child. After Jenny Ackerman (Pearson) helps Anne to give birth, she almost dies in her hospital bed. Dez vows to avenge her.
Dez Cruz	13 November	Daniel J Carver	A couple who are anxiously awaiting the birth of their child. After Jenny Ackerman (Pearson) helps Anne to give birth, she almost dies in her hospital bed. Dez vows to avenge her.
Lacey Feltham	13 November	Fay Jagger	A woman who gives birth with the help of Ruhma Carter (Patel). After the birth, she commends Ruhma and Jenny Ackerman (Pearson) for their work in such a demanding career.
Josh Harker	14 November	Carl Au	The husband of a woman who Bear Sylvester (Lee) gives lifesaving CPR to. He is devastated when she dies shortly after giving birth to their baby.
Isla Bancroft	14 November	Fiona Marr	The doctor who deals with Josh Harker's (Carl Au) wife following her being admitted into hospital.
Roisin Athy	15 November	Nuala Walsh	An Irish family that are visited by Luca McIntyre (McLaren), since Roisin is terminally ill. Whilst he is there, Roisin reveals to daughter Bronagh that Brendan is not her biological father.
Brendan Athy	15 November	Daragh O'Malley	An Irish family that are visited by Luca McIntyre (McLaren), since Roisin is terminally ill. Whilst he is there, Roisin reveals to daughter Bronagh that Brendan is not her biological father.
Bronagh Athy	15 November	Catherine Cusack	An Irish family that are visited by Luca McIntyre (McLaren), since Roisin is terminally ill. Whilst he is there, Roisin reveals to daughter Bronagh that Brendan is not her biological father.
Sian Howell	16, 23 November	Alex Murdoch	The boss of Ruhma Carter (Patel) and Jenny Ackerman (Pearson). She informs them that a formal complaint has been made against them and launches an investigation. During their meeting, Ruhma stands up for herself and Jenny, making Sian leave in floods of tears.
Mike Bailey	16 November	Matthew Field	The headteacher of a school in Letherbridge who is found naked in the playground. Rob Hollins (Walker) finds him and discovers that he is mentally unwell.
Kelly Igbon	16 November	Nicola May-Taylor	A teacher who commends Mike Bailey (Matthew Field), who despite being found naked in the playground, turned their school around and is surprised to learn of his mental illness.
Miriam Fletcher	16 November	Charlotte Workman	The parent of a pupil at Mike Bailey's (Field) school who holds a grudge against him.
Angela Hayes	20 November	Libby Mai	A birth striker who falls pregnant after having sex whilst being broken up with her boyfriend, Eddie Brewer (Barnaby Taylor). Due to her beliefs that children being born damages the environment, she arranges a termination.
Eddie Brewer	20 November	Barnaby Taylor	The boyfriend of Angela Hayes (Libby Mai) who joins her in birth striking.
Hattie Flynn	21 November	Charlotte Mills	Carol Murdock's (Margo Cargill) neighbour. She scams Carol, who is blind, by taking out a loan in her name. She is discovered by Kirsty Millar (Stamell) and arrested.
Jed Pilton	21 November	Ciaran Duce	A man who lives over the street from Carol Murdock (Cargill). Due to his tall height and deep voice, he intimidates Carol, who is blind.
Carol Murdock	21 November	Margo Cargill	A blind woman who is scammed by her neighbour, Hattie Flynn (Charlotte Mills), who takes out a loan in her name.
Gym Instructor	21 November	Duben Bello	A gym instructor that Zara Carmichael (Walsh) finds attractive, until she learns how young he is.
Ethan Shaw	22 November	Bradley Tiffin	A non-binary furry who is initially met with disapproval from their grandfather, Colin (Stephen Bent).
Colin Shaw	22 November	Stephen Bent	Ethan's (Bradley Tiffin) grandfather who is initially judgemental of their identity as a furry. Bear Sylvester (Lee) talks him into going to a furry meet-up that Ethan is attending and he eventually accepts their lifestyle.
Jordan Parkes	22 November	Finton Flynn	Ethan Shaw's (Tiffin) friend who shares their interest as a furry.
Ellie Simms	23 November	Emma Fewings	A woman who becomes overweight after weight-related abuse from her stepfather, Malcolm Dupres (Graeme Stirling). She becomes determined to lose weight after support from Jimmi Clay (Morgan).
Malcolm Dupres	23 November	Graeme Stirling	Ellie Simms' (Emma Fewings) stepfather. She reveals to Jimmi Clay (Morgan) that he used to make her turn around in front of him naked as a child. She throws him out of her house after she becomes brave enough to stand up to his abuse.
Carrie Macrae	23 November	Julia Watson	A locum doctor who comes out of retirement due to the lack of doctors in practices. She upsets Ellie Simms (Fewings) with her harsh comments about her weight. Jimmi Clay (Morgan) reprimands her, to which she walks out of the Mill mid-shift.
Liz Ford	27 November	Nicole Barber-Lane	A mature student at Letherbridge University. She is visited by best friend and former co-worker Marnie Southgate (Kiki Kendrick). Marnie pretends to have a stroke to get her to come home as she misses her, which infuriates Liz. The pair eventually make up.
Marnie Southgate	27 November	Kiki Kendrick	The best friend of Liz Ford (Nicole Barber-Lane), who worked with her in a supermarket. She fakes a stroke since she is jealous of Liz chasing a new life and wants her to come home.
Naomi Aston	27 November	Omolabake Jolaoso	A student at Letherbridge University who befriends Liz Ford (Barber-Lane).
Dom Eaton	28 November	Luke Jasztal	A married couple. Dom begins ingesting poisonous substances in order to make himself ill as part of having Munchausen syndrome. Zara Carmichael (Walsh) assumes that Zion is poisoning his husband until Dom confesses.
Zion Easton	28 November	Michael Amariah	A married couple. Dom begins ingesting poisonous substances in order to make himself ill as part of having Munchausen syndrome. Zara Carmichael (Walsh) assumes that Zion is poisoning his husband until Dom confesses.
Mel Hale	28 November	Rebecca Hesketh-Smith	A pregnant patient of Ruhma Carter's (Patel) whose baby is in breach until Ruhma gets her to exercise, which turns the baby around.
Betty Wheatcroft	29 November	Gillian Axtell	An elderly woman who recounts her experiences to Nina Bulsara (Peters) of being sent to conversion therapy due to her sapphic relationship with Frances Proud (Isa Wood). She has spent her life believing that Frances did not feel the same way as her, but finds a memorial bench in their favourite spot, which says that it was the place she would always return to.
St John Montclair	29 November	Simon Butteriss	An antiques dealer that Nina Bulsara (Peters) haggles with. She is furious when she learns that he has overcharged her son, Suni (Arya).
Frances Proud	29 November	Isa Wood	The best friend of Betty Wheatcroft (Axtell) until the pair fall in love. She is forced by her parents to stop contact with Betty, but yearns for her for the rest of her life.
Millie Hall	30 November	Isabel Vincent	A sportswoman who learns that she is HIV-positive. She learns from Luca McIntyre (McLaren), a fellow HIV-positive person, that she can take medication to reduce her viral load to a non-transmittable amount.
Alison Hall	30 November	Lesley Molony	Millie's (Isabel Vincent) mother who works in a charity shop. She considers working for a HIV charity after learning that Millie is HIV-positive.
Rav Joshi	30 November	Adam Samuel-Bal	Luca McIntyre's (McLaren) friend who raises awareness for HIV in the centre of Birmingham.
December
Jean Bennett	4 December	Rosalind March	Two elderly sisters who have no other relatives left. Dorothy is housebound and calls Jean numerous times a day since she worries for Jean's health, as well as calling Jean's doctor. Jean pretends that she is expecting bad test results from Nina Bulsara (Peters) to coax Dorothy into coming to see her. The pair are happy to be reunited and agree to stay in close contact.
Dorothy Bisset	4 December	Elizabeth Counsell	Two elderly sisters who have no other relatives left. Dorothy is housebound and calls Jean numerous times a day since she worries for Jean's health, as well as calling Jean's doctor. Jean pretends that she is expecting bad test results from Nina Bulsara (Peters) to coax Dorothy into coming to see her. The pair are happy to be reunited and agree to stay in close contact.
Thelma Scott	5 December	Helen Ryan	An elderly woman who is arrested for theft. Whilst she is asleep in her daughter's car, teenager Lewis Dickinson (Edward Neale) steals the car. Thelma demands he takes her for a joyride and promises she will not get him into trouble.
Simone Rigby	5 December	Claire Cox	Thelma Scott's (Helen Ryan) daughter who is worried when her car is stolen with her mother asleep in the backseat.
Lewis Dickinson	5 December	Edward Neale	A teenager who steals Simone Rigby's (Claire Cox) car. He is startled to find her mother, Thelma Scott (Ryan) in the backseat, but is shocked when she demands to be taken for a joyride and day of fun.
Harry Drake	6 December	Joel Phillimore	A mystery passerby who assists Jimmi Clay (Morgan) when multiple people are injured in an accident involving the collapse of scaffolding.
Michael Harvey	6 December	Adam Rickitt	A university lecturer who, due to his mental health, believes that students on campus have been sent to assassinate him.
Tom Cole	6 December	Euan Munro	Two students at Letherbridge University who compete in a game of assassins with each other.
Josie Canning	6 December	Freya Cooper	Two students at Letherbridge University who compete in a game of assassins with each other.
Natalie Parker	7 December	Grace Darling	A woman who has to attend counselling sessions with Suni Bulsara (Arya) to get back custody of her daughter. She uncovers that she abandoned her daughter in a supermarket due to being abandoned by her own mother as a child.
Maud Walpole	11 December	Brenda Longman	A woman who informs Rob Hollins (Walker) that she is worried about her neighbour, Joan Ripley (Polly Hemingway), who she has not seen in weeks. She also warns him about Joan's grandson, Dean Ripley (Sam Thorpe-Sprinks), who she believes is trouble.
Joan Ripley	11 December	Polly Hemingway	A grandmother and grandson who live together due to having no other relatives to rely on.
Dean Ripley	11 December	Sam Thorpe-Sprinks	A grandmother and grandson who live together due to having no other relatives to rely on.
Harriet Eldridge	12 December 2023–18 January 2024	Nicola Goodchild	The head of midwifery at St. Phils. She informs Ruhma Carter (Patel) that she wants her to fill in for Sian Howell (Alex Murdoch) while she has temporary leave.
Jeff Hughes	12 December	Malcolm James	A married man who wants confirmation if he is gay or not due to having been in love with his male best friend. He hires a male escort and believes that Bear Sylvester (Lee), who is visiting Jeff on a VPAS visit, is him. When his actual escort arrives, his behaviour is exposed to wife Rebecca (Kate Spiro).
Rebecca Hughes	12 December	Kate Spiro	A woman who discovers that her husband, Jeff (Malcolm James), is gay when she learns he has hired a male escort.
Robin Earl	12 December	Ishmail Aaron	An escort who arrives to Jeff Hughes' (James) house and exposes his sexuality.
Craig Hendry	13 December	Mark Donald	A patient of Nina Bulsara's (Peters) who feels unable to cope with Christmas due to his wife being killed by a deer the previous Christmas. However, Nina talks him around by saying that he has to find the positives for the sake of his daughters.
Rahul Bulsara	13 December	Ravi Aujla	The dead husband of Nina (Peters) and the father of Suni (Arya), shown through flashbacks. In Christmas 2017, he suffers from a health attack that leaves him debilitated. He gets one final Christmas with Nina and Suni before his death.
Leonardo Sampson	14 December 2023, 2 January 2024	Harry Reid	A police officer who arrests a drunk Rob Hollins (Walker) since he believes that Rob is impersonating a police officer.
Nick Aliss	14 December	Danny Ryder	A man hired to be dressed as Santa Claus at Zara Carmichael's (Walsh) dinner party. He opens up to the staff of the Mill about his money troubles and zero hour contract, claiming that none of them know what it is like to struggle. Scarlett Kiernan (Pegg) disproves him due to her prior money troubles, while Zara gives him Christmas presents for his child.
Cyndi Sommers	14 December	Nkechi Simms	A woman on a date with Leonardo Sampson (Harry Reid). She takes a disliking to him after seeing how he treats Rob Hollins (Walker).
