= The Good Ship Murder =

British crime drama series

- Genre: Crime drama Mystery
- Created by: Mike Benson; Paul Matthew Thompson
- Based on: An Original Idea; from Ben Frow
- Starring: Shayne Ward; Catherine Tyldesley
- Composers: Eimear MacCarrick; Dave Fox; Joel White; Chris Hague
- Country of origin: United Kingdom
- Original language: English
- No. of series: 3
- No. of episodes: 24

Production
- Executive producers: Paul Matthew Thompson; Mike Benson
- Producer: Sandra MacIver
- Cinematography: Andy Clark; Mark Waters
- Editors: John Phillipson; Dara McKeagney
- Running time: 42 minutes
- Production company: Clapperboard Studios

Original release
- Network: Channel 5
- Release: 13 October 2023 – present

The Good Ship Murder is a British television crime drama series created by Paul Matthew Thompson and Mike Benson, set on a luxury Mediterranean cruise ship. It follows a retired detective-turned cabaret singer solving murders on board. It stars Shayne Ward and Catherine Tyldesley. The series began broadcast on Channel 5 on 13 October 2023. The programme was renewed for two more series and a Christmas special in 2024.

In March 2026, it was announced that the show had been renewed for a fourth series. Tyldesley has decided to leave the show, but will make a guest appearance in the first episode of the new series.

== Premise ==
Former police detective Jack Grayling finds his old life intruding on his job as a cruise ship singer, when murders begin happening on board. With the help of the ship's First Officer, Kate Woods, Grayling solves a series of unusual mysteries, against the sunny backdrop of the Mediterranean.

Each episode ends with Jack performing a song in the ship's cabaret lounge.

== Cast ==
- Shayne Ward as Jack Grayling, Cruise Ship Singer and Former Police Detective
- Catherine Tyldesley as First Officer Kate Woods (Series 1–4)
- Zak Douglas as Crew Member Jamil Al-Rashid
- Geoffrey Breton as Staff Captain Piers de Vreese (Series 1–3)
- Yuna Shin as Cruise Doctor Sharon Tan
- Claire Sweeney as Cruise Director Beverley Carnell (Series 1–2024 Special)
- Ross Adams as Cruise Director Colin Smallwood (Series 2–present)
- Kiza Deen as Head of Security Frankie Johnson (Series 2–present)
- Vincent Ebrahim as Sea Captain Gregory Jameson (Series 1)
- James Barriscale as Sea Captain Richard Marlowe (2024 Special–present)
- Bex Smith as Crew Member Cassie Grainger (Series 2)
- Fiona Allen as Captain Serena "The Iceberg" Teller (Series 4–present)
- Peter Davison as Eddie Grayling (Series 4)

== Production ==
The series was filmed on board a working cruise ship, the MSC Virtuosa, operating out of Southampton. The show is produced by Clapperboard and Fifth Season. It is the fourth production Clapperboard has produced in Malta within two years.

MSC Cruises UK & Ireland Managing Director Antonio Paradiso said that the series "will bring the magnificence of MSC Virtuosa into living rooms across the country, giving viewers an inside look into life onboard one of our world-class ships." Channel 5 has hosted a number of programmes about cruises in the same 9PM TV slot, including Cruising with Jane McDonald and The Most Expensive Cruise Ship in the World, about life onboard Seven Seas Explorer.

Much of the series was filmed in Malta. It was produced with the support of the government of Malta, through the financial incentives of the Malta Film Commission. Production was "expected to generate around 2.3m euros into the local economy, according to the Malta Film Commission."

== Episodes ==
=== Series Overview ===
Series	Episodes	Originally released	
Series	Episodes	First released	Last released
1	8	13 October 2023	1 December 2023
Special	1	18 December 2024	
2	7	10 January 2025	21 February 2025
Special	1	27 December 2025	
3	7	6 January 2026	17 February 2026

=== Series 1 (2023) ===
No.	Title	Directed by	Written by	Original release date
1	"La Rochelle"	Steve Hughes	Paul Matthew Thompson	13 October 2023
Former detective turned cruise ship singer Jack Grayling teams up with First Officer Kate Woods to solve a murder in La Rochelle. Jack sings "Daydream Believer" by The Monkees.
2	"Lisbon"	Steve Hughes	Johanne McAndrew	20 October 2023
Jack and Kate set out to discover who was responsible for the death of the husband of the world's number one crime writer. Jack sings "Red Light Spells Danger" by Billy Ocean.
3	"Casablanca"	Steve Hughes	Lucia Haynes	27 October 2023
In Casablanca, the sun-drenched alleys and markets hide sinister secrets and soon, a charity helping street kids is mired in scandal and a murder has been committed. Jack sings "Dancing in the Moonlight" by Toploader.
4	"Palma"	Steve Hughes	Suzanne Cowie	3 November 2023
In Palma, a dramatic kidnap and ransom demand shatters the party mood ahead of a lavish wedding. Jack and Kate set out to unravel the mystery before it takes a tragic turn. Jack sings "Needles and Pins" by The Searchers.
5	"At Sea"	Steve Hughes	Joe Ainsworth	10 November 2023
Jack and Kate have no shortage of suspects when during a high stakes poker tournament on board their cruise ship, a top player is dealt a deadly hand. Jack sings "Every 1's a Winner" by Hot Chocolate.
6	"Sicily"	Steve Hughes	Mark Stevenson	17 November 2023
As the cruise ship arrives in Sicily, a deadly family saga unfolds involving a successful businessman, his children and his new wife. When death strikes, was it a Mafia hit or someone closer to home?. Jack sings "The Look of Love" by ABC.
7	"Barcelona"	Steve Hughes	Andrew Bayliss	24 November 2023
Jack and Kate investigate a crime that feels personal after a murderer strikes in the shadow of Barcelona's majestic Sagrada Familia, killing a member of the ship's rollerskating circus duo. Jack sings "True Faith" by New Order.
8	"Malta"	Steve Hughes	Jeff Povey	1 December 2023
As the ship stops one last time, a famous singer causes a stir. It's not long before there's a murder in Malta. Jack sings "You to Me Are Everything" by The Real Thing.

=== Special (2024) ===
No.	Title	Directed by	Written by	Original release date
9	"Dubrovnik"	Steve Hughes	Jeff Povey	18 December 2024
When the cruise ship's Santa falls ill, the crew must find a replacement to save Christmas. Their search leads them to a comedian named Buddy in Dubrovnik, who seems perfect, but his death threatens to ruin the holiday. Jack sings "The Power of Love" by Frankie Goes To Hollywood.

=== Series 2 (2025) ===
No.	Title	Directed by	Written by	Original release date
10	"Rome"	Steve Hughes	Suzanne Cowie	10 January 2025
Jack is ready to take a bold step in his relationship with Kate, but the arrival of his estranged daughter throws his plans into chaos – alongside his investigation into murder at an opera. Jack sings "Lean on Me" by Bill Withers.
11	"Gran Canaria"	Steve Hughes	Mark Stevenson	17 January 2025
Jack and Kate are still reeling from their fallout in Rome, each trying to suppress their growing feelings. Adding fuel to the fire, Piers steps into his new role as Staff Captain with calculated charm, hoping to rekindle his relationship with Kate. Jack sings " I Only Want to Be With You" by Dusty Springfield.
12	"Madeira"	Steve Hughes	Joe Ainsworth	24 January 2025
Winemaker and vineyard owner Max King is on board, promoting a year of his business. The trip ends in tragedy, when Max is killed, the suspects include his estranged wife, his son, his manager, and the previous owner of the vineyard. Jack sings "She Drives Me Crazy" by Fine Young Cannibals.
13	"Gozo"	Steve Hughes	Andy Bayliss	31 January 2025
A lavish influencer party on a sun-soaked Gozo beach turns deadly when its host, Tony Tong, is found murdered. Amid the chaos, Jamil is discovered passed out near the scene, making him the prime suspect. Jack sings "Try a Little Tenderness" by Otis Redding.
14	"Alexandria"	Steve Hughes	Lucia Haynes	7 February 2025
A pickpocketing ring aboard the ship spirals into murder when one of the culprits is killed. And Jack's recklessness prompts Piers to seize the opportunity to accuse Jack of misconduct. Jack sings "Everybody's Got to Learn Sometime" by The Korgis.
15	"Côte d'Azur"	Steve Hughes	Rob Kinsman	14 February 2025
The much-anticipated reunion concert from a classic band from yesteryear is jeopardised when the bass-player is shot dead. Jack sings "The Great Pretender" by The Platters.
16	"Athens"	Steve Hughes	Kat Rose Martin	21 February 2025
A romantic relic becomes the target of a daring robbery, turning a routine museum theft into a deadly encounter that claims an innocent life. Jack sings "Don't Leave Me This Way" by The Communards.

=== Special (2025) ===
No.	Title	Directed by	Written by	Original release date
17	"Alicante"	Steve Hughes	Paul Matthew Thompson	27 December 2025
After the ship docks in the Spanish resort of Alicante, Donna, claiming a life-changing illness, boards with her friend Bernie. As the festive voyage begins, Donna charms fellow passenger Gary and visits a remote monastery. Jack sings "Stay Another Day" by East 17.

=== Series 3 (2026) ===
No.	Title	Directed by	Written by	Original release date
18	"Cannes"	Steve Hughes	Jeff Povey	6 January 2026
Jack and Kate set out to solve the murder of a rising film star at the premiere of her film in Cannes. Jack sings "You're Still The One" by Shania Twain.
19	"Istanbul"	Steve Hughes	Joe Ainsworth	13 January 2026
A disgruntled patient is the prime suspect of a murder that happens during a presentation by a well renowned wellness guru. Jack sings "More Than Words" by Extreme.
20	"Crete"	Steve Hughes	Julie Parsons	20 January 2026
Jack and Kate are on the case when a photographer hoping to recreate a photo of his long lost muse is murdered. Jack sings "Waiting for a Star to Fall" by Boy Meets Girl.
21	"Cape Verde"	Steve Hughes	Jayshree Patel	27 January 2026
Jack and Kate try to solve the murder of one of two widows on a grief cruise. Jack sings "This Love" by Maroon 5.
22	"Valletta"	Munir Malik	Rob Kinsman	3 February 2026
In Malta, Jack and Jamil investigate after one of a pair of brothers is murdered during a scavenger hunt. Jack sings "Back For Good" by Take That.
23	"Ibiza"	Steve Hughes	Kat Rose-Martin	10 February 2026
After the business associate of a nightclub owner is murdered by being pushed off the venue's balcony, Jack and Kate set out to solve the case. Jack sings "Heaven" by Bryan Adams.
24	"Ancona"	Steve Hughes	Kit Lambert	17 February 2026
When a crew member is murdered, Jack and a devastated Kate is on the case. After Captain Marlowe is shockingly arrested, an unconvinced Jack vows to bring the true culprit to justice. But when the identity of the killer is revealed, the ship's crew is in for another shock. Jack sings "Don't You" (Forget About Me) by Simple Minds.

== Reception ==
The i Paper described the show as "not supposed to be a comedy, but Shayne Ward's silly cruise ship murder mystery is sheer ridiculous fun".
