= Kiza Deen =

British actress

- Education: Royal Academy of Dramatic Art
- Occupation: Actress
- Years active: 2015–
- Television: Hollyoaks; The Good Ship Murder

Kiza Deen is a British actress. She graduated from the Royal Academy of Dramatic Art in 2012 and began working at Royal Shakespeare Company later that year. Her first television role came in 2015, where she played Sonia Albright in the British soap opera Hollyoaks, although her character was originally credited as Lisa Loveday before being revealed to be an imposter. After leaving the role in 2016, Deen wanted to be in more film and television productions, but she ended up appearing in several stage productions, including Expensive Shit (2017), random (2019), The Phlebotomist (2019), Rockets and Blue Lights (2021) and King Hamlin (2022). Deen acclaimed for her stage productions from various critical reviews. She also played Naomi Silva in the television series Silent Witness (2018) and Mariam in Young Wallander (2020). Since 2024, she has portrayed Frankie Johnson in the The Good Ship Murder. She has also guest-starred in the medical dramas Casualty (2022) and Doctors (2023), in addition to the short film They Heard Him Shout Allahu Akbar (2022).

== Life and career ==
=== Graduation and Hollyoaks ===
After graduating from the Royal Academy of Dramatic Art in July 2012 with a BA in Acting Degree, Kiza Deen successfully auditioned for the Royal Shakespeare Company the following month, which was her first professional role, and began rehearsals in December 2012. She liked being paid to act but found it difficult; she was often an understudy for roles as she had just left drama school and would rehearse in the day before performing later in the evenings.

In June 2015, it was announced that Deen had been cast as Lisa Loveday, the long-lost daughter of Simone (Jacqueline Boatswain) and Louis Loveday (Karl Collins) and the brother of Zack Loveday (Duayne Boachie), in the British soap opera Hollyoaks; she made her first appearance later that month. This was Deen's first television role and she felt "starstruck" when she saw the cast as she had grown up watching the soap. She praised Boatswain, Boachie and Collins for helping her get settled in Liverpool, where the soap is filmed, and showing her the ropes of working on the soap. Deen explained that she had been "desperately" wanting to work in television and was excited when she was called by her agent to say she got an audition for Hollyoaks; after meeting the casting director in London, she believed she would not get the role as there were various other girls auditioning for Lisa. She then went to Liverpool for a second audition and then had another audition after, with Deen explaining, "It was easy to start with and then it got nerve-wracking towards the end because I knew there was a chance I might get it." She filmed screentests with Boatswain and Boachie for her first and second auditions, and she found out she got the role in April 2015, but was not allowed to tell anyone, which she found difficult. After being cast, she had a meeting to find out about her upcoming storylines, which she called a "dream story to play" due to her character having several layers to her. Deen found her first scenes very fun to film and explained, "I remember walking through the scene in the rehearsal and I was a bit of an eager beaver, so I really went for it with the physical stuff. The director said, 'Kiza, you do know that was a walk-through?!' I said, 'This is my first time on TV, I'm just overexcited!'". She added that her mother and boyfriend's mother had been asking her when her first episode on Hollyoaks would air.

Deen found working on Hollyoaks "surreal" and sometimes called actors by their characters' names as she had watched the soap as a teenager. She praised the Royal Shakespeare Company for preparing her for the role, and said of Hollyoaks, "It was a lot to absorb, working with a different director on each block of each episode. It moves so fast – you'd get scripts on the same day or the night before, and you couldn't complain". When she first joined the soap, she was looking for a place to live in Liverpool and the other cast members gave her ideas to help her. She said of the cast, "They're all lovely and I'm really excited to work with a lot of them. It's nice to read a script and see that you're going to be in a scene with someone unexpected". Deen's character was later revealed to be imposter of Lisa called Sonia Albright, who had taken the identity of the real Lisa; it was subsequently revealed that Deen's character had always been intended to be revealed as an imposter despite having been announced to be Lisa. Deen explained that despite originally being told that she was portraying Lisa, she later was told in a meeting with Hollyoaks producers that she was playing an imposter, which she was shocked by. Deen joked that she found the many revelations in the year-long storyline tiring, and said that she was excited to play Sonia as "it's fun to play an impostor and live a double life". During her time on the soap, Sonia's storylines included pretending to be Lisa, revealing her true identity, being blackmailed, a romantic relationship with Zack, feuding with the real Lisa (Rachel Adedeji), and the death of her sister Jade Albright (Kassius Nelson) from cancer. Deen later left Hollyoaks, with her exit originally airing on 26 October 2016. Following her exit, Hollyoaks released a video which featured some of Deen's Hollyoaks colleagues singing and saying goodbye to her; Deen wrote on social media that her 18 months on the soap had been "amazing" and she thanked the viewers for the support they had shown her.

=== Since 2016 ===
After leaving Hollyoaks, Deen wanted to act in film and television and was unsure about going back to theatre due to how "gruelling" she found it at the Royal Shakespeare Company; however, she auditioned for the Theatre Royal Bath, which she had not been to before, and enjoyed working with the older actors there. She explained, "In rehearsals I just tried to soak up as much as possible. Although I did want to carry on with television, I think the universe has a way of giving you exactly what you need." In 2017, Deen was cast as lead role Tolu in the stage production Expensive Shit, which featured the dance and music of Fela Kuti's Afrobeat genre. Deen told Glasgow Live that she was originally scared to take the role but was convinced to by her friends, and that she found Tolu different from her Hollyoaks role. The show opened in Glasgow before touring around the UK; she found the show amazing and fun to be part of, and enjoyed being in Glasgow for it, finding everyone friendly. Talking about her first tour, Deen found being in different venues every night difficult, especially as they were so different from each other, and had to go "really hard" on her vocal warm-ups due to always having to adjust to different venues. The performance had varying amounts of audience members and Deen said that she kept pushing to make sure the audience was following her. The role required her to dance and sing in addition to acting, which she found intense. She considered the show to be the most difficult she had ever done, explaining, "We had two weeks to rehearse, so I was a bit overwhelmed. But I'm so thankful I've had this experience because I'm maturing in my artistry – it's forcing me to take pride in my work. I never considered myself an artist before. Now I understand why people call themselves artists. It's so fragile and you want to do it justice. I'm no longer just an actor trying to sell you a story: I'm really invested in it." Terry Eastham from LondonTheatre1 highlighted Deen for being on stage the whole time and swapping "from her Lagos personality to her Glasgow one at the drop of a hat", adding, "Deen's performance is wonderfully nuanced and you can see the woman she has become as her life has changed".

In 2018, Deen portrayed DCI Naomi Silva in the 21st series of the British drama Silent Witness. The following year, Deen starred in debbie tucker green's one-woman play random, which centred on the fatal stabbing of a black schoolboy. Deen played all four characters (Sister, Mother, Father and Brother) in the play, which ran at Leeds Playhouse between 4 and 16 February 2019. Clare Brennan from The Guardian gave the play five stars and opined that Deen excelled and "gloriously delivered" the performance, which Brennan called "vibrantly energised, life-full and, ultimately, a profound expression of the shock of sudden death". Catherine Love from the same publication gave the play four stars and praised Deen's performance, writing that she "switches swiftly between these distinct individuals, by just a drop of the shoulder here or a tilt of the head there". John Murphy from The Stage rated the play four out of five stars and called it "Superbly performed", writing:

"Random was written for a solo performer and Kiza Deen is extraordinary in Gbolahan Obisesan's revival, fluidly moving between four different characters. Her performance is as powerful as the words. Whether playing a swaggering schoolboy or a sister in mourning, she's utterly convincing. Her encapsulation of someone consumed by grief, walking around in front of Max Johns' set of upturned chairs, desperately trying to make sense of the horrific events that have befallen her family, is heartbreaking. It's the little things that upend you – the moment when she tries to catch one last whiff of her brother's scent, or sees his computer left on standby, never to be used again."

The following month, Deen portrayed Char in the stage production of The Phlebotomist, which ran at the Hampstead Theatre from 19 March to 20 April 2019. Aleks Sierz from The Arts Desk praised Deen's journey as Char for being "clearly and movingly drawn". Also in 2019, it was announced that Deen would portray Mariam in the crime drama television series Young Wallander, which was released on Netflix the following year. Deen later played Lou in the stage adaptation of Rockets and Blue Lights at the Dorfman Theatre, where she worked with her Hollyoaks colleague Karl Collins again. The production ran from 25 August to 9 October 2021. Ava Wong Davies from The Stage praised Deen for strong performance and holding "herself with taut poise", whilst Paul Taylor from The Independent commented that Deen "beautifully" portrayed Lou and highlighted her costume. Alice Grahame from Plays International & Europe called Deen a "Leading young actress" when reviewing the production.

Deen played Tannoy in They Heard Him Shout Allahu Akbar, the first short in the Foresight short film series, which was released in 2022. Later that year, she portrayed Mama H in the play King Hamlin, which ran from 19 October to 12 November 2022 at the Park Theatre (London), London. Dave Fargnoli from The Stage opined that Deen stood out in the cast, writing that she "invests the role with great strength and dignity, but also a deep, unshakeable weariness", whilst Arifa Akbar from The Guardian criticised Deen's character, the only adult in the plot, for being "rather too lightly drawn". The following year, Deen portrayed Claudia Briant, a police constable who dates established characters Bear Sylvester (Dex Lee), for several episodes in the BBC soap opera Doctors, with her first appearance airing on 24 May of that year. In 2024, Deen began portraying Frankie Johnson in the British crime series The Good Ship Murder, first appearing in its December 2024 special. She has since played the role in the second series of the show (2025) and its December 2025 special, which came shortly before the third series began. Deen has also made guest appearances in the medical drama television series Casualty as Mercy Williams.

== Acting credits ==
=== Filmography ===
Year	Title	Role	Notes	Ref.
2015–16	Hollyoaks	Sonia Albright	Regular role	
2018	Silent Witness	Naomi Silva	Series 21	
2020	Young Wallander	Mariam	Season 1	
2022	They Heard Him Shout Allahu Akbar	Tannoy	Short film in Foresight series	
2022	Casualty	Mercy Williams	Guest role (1 episode)	
2023	Doctors	Claudia Briant	Recurring role	
2024–	The Good Ship Murder	Frankie Johnson	Main cast	

=== Theatre credits ===
Year	Production	Role	Venue(s)	Ref.
2017	Expensive Shit	Tolu	Various (UK tour)	
2019	random	All characters (Sister, Mother, Father and Brother)	Leeds Playhouse	
2019	The Phlebotomist	Char	Hampstead Theatre	
2021	Rockets and Blue Lights	Lou	Dorfman Theatre	
2022	King Hamlin	Mama H	Park Theatre (London)	
