= Jack Whitam =

English actor

Jack Whitam is an English actor.

Whitam has appeared in a large number of Shakespeare plays during his career, notably as Caliban in Sprite Productions version of The Tempest which was set on a real island in the lakes of Ripley Castle and as Touchstone in As You Like It which was directed by The Factory Theatre Company artistic director Alex Hassell, where he was lauded as a "comic tour de force". In September 2023, he made his third appearance in the BBC soap opera Doctors as Mark Greer.
