= Jamie Bacon =

English actor

Jamie Bacon (born 13 August 1997) is a British actor known for his appearance in the 2018 film Into the Mirror.

== Career ==
Bacon appeared in Into The Mirror (2018), He made his film debut in the 2015 feature film The Hoarder, and was later a supporting actor in 2019's Brighton alongside Phil Davies, Lesley Sharp, Larry Lamb, and Marion Bailey.

He is known for his role in popular productions such as Netflix's 2020 White Lines series. In 2023, he played the character of Bill on the BBC's Father Brown. He got a lead role in The Great Getaway. Bacon is slated to star in Joy Ghararo-Akpoiotor's feature-film debut, Dreamers, and also appeared in Nepal's first science-fiction film, Eklo I, with Kabita Nepali, Benisha Hamal, Vijay Lama, and Pradeep Khadka. Bacon played the role of the British astronaut Zach in Eklo I.
