= Joanne Cardsley =

UK soap opera character, created 2015

- Hollyoaks character
- Portrayed by: Rachel Leskovac
- Duration: 2015–2016
- First appearance: 17 September 2015
- Last appearance: 5 December 2016
- Introduced by: Bryan Kirkwood
In-universe information
- Occupation: Lawyer
- Mother: Janet Cardsley

Joanne Cardsley is a fictional character from the British Channel 4 soap opera Hollyoaks, played by Rachel Leskovac. The character made her first on-screen appearance on 17 September 2015. Joanne's arrival on-screen was not announced prior to broadcast. It was later reported she had joined the show as a regular cast member. Producer Bryan Kirkwood was glad to cast Leskovac because he admired her previous work as Natasha Blakeman on Coronation Street. Joanne is introduced as an old friend of Simone Loveday (Jacqueline Boatswain). She is characterised as an intelligent and successful solicitor but has a troubled personal life. Driven by loneliness she concocts schemes and behaves in a manipulative manner. The character made her final appearance on 5 December 2016 at the end of Leskovac's one-year contract.

Her main storyline has seen her become fixated on stealing Simone's husband Louis Loveday (Karl Collins). The pair had an affair fourteen years earlier which was depicted during flashback scenes. However, Joanne wants to resume the relationship despite Louis being adamant that he wants nothing to do with her. Since her introduction, Joanne has tried to seduce Louis on numerous occasions, blackmailed him and thrown herself in-front of his moving car. She has locked Simone in a van, sabotages her relationship and manages to move into her home. In addition, Joanne has sex with their son Zack Loveday (Duayne Boachie) and manipulates their "daughter" Sonia Albright (Kiza Deen) to secure her place in the Loveday household. Writers continued to develop the character's presence as a homewrecker and played her trying to snare Joe Roscoe (Ayden Callaghan) from his girlfriend Mercedes McQueen (Jennifer Metcalfe). Hollyoaks also formed an on-screen friendship with James Nightingale (Gregory Finnegan). The character's actions have led to critics of the genre branding her as scheming, devious and a bunny boiler. Hollyoaks press team even released a statement claiming Joanne is "one of the most talked-about bunny boilers in soaps."

== Casting ==
Leskovac had to complete a screen test with Karl Collins who plays Louis Loveday prior to securing the part. They had never met but worked on the scene prior to recording and she believed they instantly worked well together. The character debuted on-screen unannounced during a special episode of Hollyoaks which focused on the backstory of the established Loveday family. It was later reported that Leskovac had signed a contract to appear on the show on a regular basis. The actress released a statement expressing her excitement to be playing a "challenging" role in the show. Producer Bryan Kirkwood was happy to have secured Leskovac because he had admired her work on fellow soap opera Coronation Street, where she portrayed Natasha Blakeman.

== Development ==
=== Characterisation and introduction ===
"Smart, driven but ultimately damaged, Joanne is a deeply troubled soul who’s been waiting all her life for her happy ending. Working as a successful duty solicitor, she has achieved everything she’s ever wanted professionally, but now she is looking to settle down with Mr. Perfect. Hopeless loneliness combined with relentless determination will make the perfect combo to rip the Lovedays apart, but one thing’s for sure: Joanne is here to get what she wants."

Joanne is characterised as career a driven character who has achieved success in her legal career. But emotionally she is troubled and through her loneliness she schemes to get what she wants. Leskovac has described Joanne as an "interesting character with a lot of depth and intensity but she's also very vulnerable too." Leskovac has described her character as an intelligent woman. She can often let her heart rule her head which helps to create the storylines writers pen for Joanne. At the point she arrives in the show Leskovac acknowledged the character as a "home wrecker". In Joanne's backstory she had split with her husband and is a "lonely" character.

Joanne was introduced during an episode set in 2001, the day that Lisa Loveday was abducted. Prior to the episode airing it was revealed that Lisa's father was hiding a secret about his whereabouts that day. Joanne features in the episode as Simone Loveday's (Jacqueline Boatswain) best friend. During the episode, it was revealed that Louis and Joanne were having an affair at the time of Lisa's disappearance.

=== Manipulating the Lovedays ===
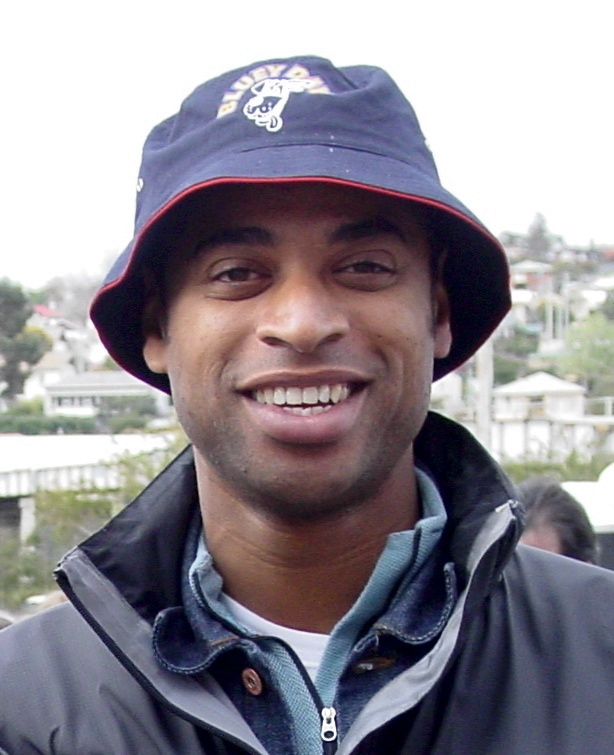
Karl Collins plays Joanne's ex-lover Louis Loveday

In October 2015, producer Kirkwood revealed that he was keen for the Lovedays to have a strong marriage. But believed they should have made mistakes and the introduction of Joanne would help to explore Louis' past. Sophie Dainty from Digital Spy reported that Joanne would arrive in Hollyoaks village and blackmail Louis. The story begins as Louis received a letter warning him that his past will be exposed. He then receives a photograph which prompts him to meet up with his blackmailer who is revealed to be Joanne. She explains that her ex-husband has left her in debt and she needs £5000 from Louis or she will expose their affair. He gives her £200 which angers Joanne and she threatens to visit Simone. Louis is nervous about Joanne's presence in the village and starts to argue with Simone. Joanne informs Louis she will leave and asks her to join him for a drink to say goodbye. This makes Joanne believe that there are still feelings between them and she decides to stay. Writers then played the character thinking of schemes to make Louis resume their former affair. Louis tries to forget about Joanne's blackmail but she sends him a card which he hides from Simone. Joanne then sneaks into the Lovedays home and dresses provocatively to seduce Louis. When Louis returns home he is shocked and angered by Joanne's behaviour.

Leskovac told Laura Heffernan from Inside Soap that she expected fans of Louis and Simone to be unhappy with Joanne's meddling, but added that she thought it made Joanne an interesting character to portray. In the storyline, Joanne visits Simone and offers her a job at her law firm. This leaves Louis worried that Joanne will reveal the truth and he tries to persuade Simone not to accept the job. Joanne then decides to try to seduce Louis once again. Leskovac believed that her character was not crazy but rather "just truly, madly, deeply in love with Louis". She explained that Joanne is fixated on the chemistry the pair used to have. Her actions are not full of malice but she has "tunnel vision" where Louis is concerned. Louis sternly rejects her latest advances which hurts Joanne's feelings. The actress said that her character is desperate to remind Louis of what they used to have. But the problem is that she is holding onto something that happened years before and perceiving their affair to be more than it was. She then causes more trouble by visiting Simone and making Louis believe she is about to reveal the truth and then doing the opposite. Leskovac concluded that her character is "on a mission to win Louis back at any cost."

Collins was upset with the storyline because he believed the Lovedays were a great family whose love could be seen on-screen. He had expected them to "live happily ever after". But Collins was happy with the opportunity to portray the drama Joanne and Louis' affair created. Boatswain said that the scenario of her best friend Joanne and husband Louis having an affair would leave her devastated. Writers began to escalate drama and make Joanne's schemes more extreme. Simone plans to watch her son Zack Loveday (Duayne Boachie) play an important football match. But Joanne becomes jealous and steals notes Simone has prepared for a legal presentation. Simone has to miss the match to rewrite her notes. Later Joanne locks Simone in her van and invites herself to stay with the Lovedays claiming her boiler is broken. With Simone trapped in her van she takes over a romantic meal Louis had prepared for his wife. When Louis and Simone argue Joanne seizes the opportunity to try to seduce him again. Having failed once again Joanne decides she needs to gain more leverage on Louis and jumps in front of his car. Louis is left fearing that he has killed Joanne, but she is later discharged from hospital. Joanne keeps the fact Louis was driving a secret from Simone giving her another secret to use against him.

Hollyoaks then began promoting a story in which Zack would be unfaithful with a mystery woman. Theresa McQueen (Jorgie Porter) catches her boyfriend and the woman having sex. The show refused to make the identity of the female public. When the episode was broadcast it was revealed to be Joanne in another scheme. Boachie told Sarah Ellis of Inside Soap that his character is "devastated" to be caught with Joanne. He finds it "really embarrassing" and asks Theresa to keep it a secret. Simone finds Joanne's bra hidden behind her sofa and realises that she has slept with Zack. She orders Joanne to move out and later throws pasta sauce over her. This prompts Joanne to reveal that Louis was driving the car that ran her over.

=== Snaring Joe Roscoe ===
In July 2016, the show released a trailer previewing advance storylines. It showed that Joanne would develop romantic feelings for Joe Roscoe (Ayden Callaghan) and attempt to steal him from his girlfriend Mercedes McQueen (Jennifer Metcalfe). Digital Spy's Kilkelly reported that Joanne would also have a one-night stand with Liam Donovan (Maxim Baldry). The story commenced after Joanne learns that her mother, Janet Cardsley (Ruth Evans), is dying from Alzheimer's disease. She has sex with Liam in order to forget her worries. The following day, Joanne tries to spend additional time with Liam and is unaware that he wants nothing more to do with her. The events formed a "bad week" for Joanne and her sadness catches the attention Joe who consoles her. His kindness causes Joanne to take an interest in him. When Janet dies from her illness Joanne decides to take action. Firstly, Joanne plans to take revenge on Liam for humiliating her. Leskovac told Sarah Ellis from Inside Soap that her character is angry with Liam and herself for letting him hurt her. She was vulnerable and grieving for her mother and became to intense with Liam causing him to feel intimidated by her. She added "now she feels very foolish, and he just can't get away with that."

Leskovac described Joanne and Joe's first encounter as a "classic romantic moment" in which a "gallant Joe" helps her. She then makes eye contact with him and thinks "he's just gorgeous". She told Ellis that her character would not be phased that Joe is in a relationship with Mercedes. She described Mercedes as "a force to be reckoned with" and noted her character is "not the shy and retiring type" either; so the personalities would cause "fireworks" during scenes. Metcalfe told Hayley Minn from OK! that "Joanne's a real bunny boiler. Rachel (Leskovac) plays a fantastic bunny boiler and we should be worried." Leskovac branded Joanne "devious" and described their competition to win Joe as a "delicious battle".

The story showed that writers had invested time into developing the character as a homewrecker. The actress defended her character, explaining that as with previous stories, Joanne's intentions originally come from a "good place" rather than "malicious". The "very driven" Joanne cannot grasp the idea of Joe being with Mercedes, as he could instead be with her. Leskovac concluded that her on-screen counterpart views herself "very stable, loving and kind, and she's willing to take on his kids and be the girlfriend he deserves."

The story also made way for Hollyoaks writers to develop Joanne's main friendship with fellow scheming character James Nightingale (Gregory Finnegan). Joanne explains her want of Joe; and James reveals he wants to steal Scott Drinkwell's (Ross Adams) boyfriend John Paul McQueen (James Sutton). The duo team up and place a bet on who can snare their potential love interests away from their partners first. Leskovac was happy to work alongside Finnegan on the story because she had previously worked on other projects with him. She explained that he is a "phenomenal actor" who prompts her to elevate her performance in scenes. She thought the characters were "brilliant" together, adding "aside from the naughtiness, you'll be seeing a softer side to both characters. It's nicer than dismissing Joanne as a bunny boiler - she's a hopeless romantic really."

James decides to help Joanne steal Joe from Mercedes. He causes Joanne's car to break-down and telephones Joe's mechanic firm for assistance. The plan fails to get Joanne and Joe alone together and he rethinks his strategy when he finds evidence of Mercedes being linked to a drug deal. James reports Mercedes and she is arrested. Joe is upset following the revelation Mercedes has lied to him and Joanne decides to take advantage of the situation. Callaghan told Ellis that his character is in a "fragile" and "vulnerable" position and he likes the attention Joanne gives him and is even aware she is attracted to him. Joanne kisses Joe and he responds positively embracing her. The actor added that Joanne appears normal in comparison to Mercedes, even though Hollyoaks' viewers knew different. He believed that despite a single kiss, Joanne would quickly presume they would begin a serious relationship. Joanne is concerned to learn Mercedes could potentially be released from custody and worries how it will affect her plan to snare Joe. Callaghan was unsure of the story, noting that if Joe were behaving in Joanne's manner the audience would perceive it as "quite predatory". He added "however, men can be vulnerable, too! Joe's weak, so he's looking for comfort and safety - and Joanne totally takes advantage of that." Leskovac told Soaplife's Sally Brockaway that her character feels guilty that Mercedes in prison, but James is like the "devil on her shoulder" constantly encouraging her. Joe decides to begin a romance with Joanne and proceedings move along quickly. Joe even gives Joanne a key to his home. Mercedes is released from prison and she begs Joe for another chance. He decides to break-up with Joanne in favour of his fiancée. Joanne then decides to try to steal Joe back.

== Storylines ==
Joanne sends threatening letters and photographs to Louis. She arrives in the village to ask Louis for money to help her out of debt. He cannot afford the amount and she threatens to tell Simone they have had an affair. Louis pays her off and she agrees to leave, but returns believing Louis still has feelings for her. She tries to seduce him on a number occasions and he orders her to leave the village. She visits Simone pretending to be new to the village and offers Simone a job at her legal firm. Louis begs Joanne to leave and orders Simone to refuse the job offer. Joanne persuades Simone to ignore Louis and take the job. Joanne convinces Simone to tell Louis she is going to stay with her mother to conceal her attendance at a legal presentation. Joanne engineers a scenario so Louis discovers that Simone has been lying which causes drama in the Loveday's home. Joanne uses the opportunity to try to get closer to Louis. She then locks Simone in a van and tries to seduce Louis who rejects her again. Joanne agrees to leave, but as Louis is driving away she throws herself in front of his car and runs her over accidentally.

Joanne survives and while in hospital Simone insists that she come and live with her until she is recovered. Joanne then sleeps with Zack and Theresa catches them together. She threatens to tell everyone but later changes her mind. Louis finds out but agrees not to tell Simone. When Zack goes on a date, Simone comes home to meet his new love interest. She finds a bra hidden behind the sofa and demands to know who owns it. Joanne later arrives and claims the bra belongs to her. This exposes Joanne and Zack fling and she forces Joanne to leave her home. Joanne tries to apologise but Simone feels too betrayed that she chose to sleep with her son. The pair argue, Simone pours pasta sauce over Joanne who reacts by revealing that Louis ran her over. Joanne gives legal representation to Wayne (Nathan Whitfield) and he requests that Sonia Albright (Kiza Deen) is his alibi. He reveals that she is an impostor and is not Louis and Simone's long-lost daughter. Knowing that seeking out Lisa will expose her real identity, Joanne concocts a plan. She writes a false statement and tricks Wayne into signing it. She threatens to ensure that he spends more time in prison by sabotaging his case. He agrees to abide by her rules and Joanne pretends to be sympathetic towards Sonia. She thanks her and convinces Simone to allow Joanne to move back in resulting in Joanne's scheme being successful.

Joanne betrays her friend James and secures a job at a lawyer firm he was being considered for. Joanne learns that her mother, Janet is dying and James decides to comfort her. Liam sleeps with Joanne for a joke and is worried when she behaves too enthusiastically about the possibility of a relationship. James takes Joanne to visit her mother before she dies. He poses as her boyfriend so that Janet will die believing her daughter has found happiness. James suggests the best way to deal with her grief is too gain revenge against Liam. He suffers from ornithophobia and Joanne releases a chicken in his salon which terrifies him. Joe consoles Joanne when she is upset over her mother and she feels an instant attraction. She then offers to help him with legal issues and informs James of her intention to snare Joe from Mercedes. When Mercedes is arrested for drug dealing Joe turns to Joanne and they begin a relationship. They quickly begin to spend much time together and he gives her a key to his home. Mercedes is released from prison and Joe gets back with Mercedes. An upset Joanne convinces herself that Joe has made a mistake and she enter his home and slips into his bed. Mercedes catches her and confronts her and Joe. Joe's brother, Freddie (Charlie Clapham), pretends he invited Joanne over for sex and claims she entered the incorrect bedroom.

Joanne reveals to Joe that Mercedes is a drug dealer, and as a result Joe refuses to marry Mercedes, jilting her at the altar. He then reveals to Mercedes that he cheated with Joanne while she was in prison. Joe and Joanne then begin a relationship, but this is stopped when Louis reveals to Joe how manipulative Joanne can be. He then dumps Joanne and decides to reconcile with Mercedes at the "Halloween Spooktacular" by proposing to her on the ferris wheel. Joanne then tampers with the controls of the ferris wheel and stops it with Joe and Mercedes suspended in the air, and throws away the key. Events take a sinister turn when a nearby explosion causes Joe to fall from the ferris wheel to his death. Believing that Louis is responsible for Joe's death, Joanne vows revenge. She blackmails Prince McQueen (Malique Thompson-Dwyer) to claim that Louis assaulted him, and so Louis seeks legal representation from James. He visits his flat, where Joanne arrives and attempts to seduce Louis once more, but he pushes her away and she cuts her head. The police then arrive after being called by Zack and Lisa Loveday (Rachel Adedeji), where Joanne attempts to convince them that Louis has assaulted her, but she and Louis are both arrested. Meanwhile, Simone visits Joanne's former flatmate and Lisa's abductor, Margaret Smith (Suzette Llewellyn), where it is revealed that Joanne had convinced Margaret that Simone was beating Lisa and so she abducted Lisa to save her.

Simone visits Joanne at the police station, confronting her over her part in Lisa's abduction. However, Joanne threatens Simone with a paper knife that she took from James' flat. The pair leave the police station, where they bump into Lisa, who punches Joanne. Simone attempts to call the police, but Joanne attacks Lisa, stabbing Simone in the process. James calls the police when Joanne turns up at his flat, but she lies that Simone attacked her first. When Mercedes hears of Simone's stabbing, she confronts Joanne over her involvement in Joe's death and Lisa's abduction, where Joanne admits to everything she has done. It is then revealed that Mercedes was recording her confessions, and when the police arrive, Louis expresses his hatred towards Joanne before she is arrested for stabbing Simone and her role in Lisa's abduction. She later gives a photograph of Louis to a prison officer, informing them that he is her husband, before being locked in a cell. Zack later informs his family that Joanne has been charged with attempted murder and kidnap.

== Reception ==
A What's on TV reporter observed Joanne's subtle scheming opining that "it seems she’s slowly driving a wedge between the Lovedays." Sophie Dainty (Digital Spy) said that Joanne had been "wreaking havoc" in the show and branded her a "manipulative character" with "scheming antics" and a "bunny boiler". Dainty later stated "we all know that Hollyoaks man-eater Joanne Cardsley will stop at nothing to get what she wants." Her colleague Daniel Kilkelly branded her a "ruthless" character. Duncan Lindsay from Metro stated that "unstable Joanne is fast becoming one of soap’s classic bunny boilers." He added that Joanne had pulled "out all of the stops" to snare Louis from Simone. The reporter later stated "Joanne Cardsley is a woman who knows how to get what she wants in Hollyoaks." He also opined that "the words ‘Joanne’ and ‘sensible’ don't exactly go together."

An Inside Soap reporter called Joanne "scheming" and "jealous", their colleague added that she is a "devious" character. Sarah Ellis from the publication wrote "Joanne may not have many friends in Hollyoaks after destroying Louis and Simone's marriage [...] But Inside Soap can't get enough of her antics. We love that she goes all-out to get what she wants, without a second thought for anyone she has to walk over in the process!" Another reporter from the publication, referencing Joanne and James, stated "with Hollyoaks just packed with criminals and villains, it’s a real shame that the only lawyers in town are as corrupt as their clients."
