= Matt Carter (Coronation Street) =

Fictional character from Coronation Street

- Coronation Street character
- Portrayed by: Oliver Mellor
- Duration: 2010–2013
- First appearance: Episode 7406; 20 August 2010
- Last appearance: Episode 8098; 5 April 2013
- Introduced by: Phil Collinson
In-universe information
- Occupation: General practitioner

Dr. Matt Carter is a fictional character from the British ITV soap opera Coronation Street, played by Oliver Mellor. He made his first on screen appearance on 20 August 2010. On 30 June 2013, Mellor revealed that he had quit the show and Matt would not appear again.

== Development ==
=== Introduction ===
Oliver Mellor was initially cast as a doctor for Natasha Blakeman's (Rachel Leskovac) pregnancy storyline. Digital Spy said Mellor had initially been signed for four episodes, but that there was a "strong possibility" he would return for a longer stint. The character was introduced in August 2010 as Dr Carter, Gail Platt's (Helen Worth) new boss at the medical centre.

=== Relationship with Tina McIntyre ===
In June 2011, it was revealed that Matt would embark on a romance with Tina McIntyre. However, Keegan has revealed that she thinks her character "would feel out of place with Matt". Mellor commented that he wanted to "explore a darker side" to his character. He said to Soaplife: "Hopefully he's going to get one. They're putting it together now and I'm hoping I'll get the chance to show that Matt's not Mr Perfect and has a bit of a dark side. I'd like him to have a love interest," he continued. "There are a few possibilities. I mean, the Coronation Street women aren't exactly spoilt for choice when it comes to fit men, are they?"

Mellor revealed that getting an on-screen romance is like "getting a promotion". Speaking to the Daily Mirror, Mellor explained: "When Chris and I are in character, we're like rutting stags trying to be the alpha male. Sometimes when the camera stops rolling, we carry that on in the green room and pretend we're competing over Tina. I'm sure there are a lot of jealous guys who wish they were in our shoes. Who wouldn't be? Most guys on the Street would like Tina as their on-screen girlfriend and I think, deep down, they all fancy Michelle. Everyone has a secret crush on her. But you can't really blame them, can you? There's a reason why Michelle is winning all these sexiest female awards. And she's lovely too. She doesn't have a bad bone in her body."

=== Departure ===
On 30 June 2013, it was announced that Mellor had quit Coronation Street. Roz Laws from the Sunday Mercury reported that the actor had left the show two months prior because he had nothing to do. Matt will not be seen on-screen again and there will be no explanation for his departure. Of his reason for quitting, Mellor stated "There were quite long periods when I didn't appear at all, so I realised it was time to leave. They didn't try to make me stay – they admitted they didn't have any solid plans for the doctor and it would be more of the same. I thought 'Fair enough, you've been great but it's time to go'." Mellor explained that his character was not progressing as much as he wanted and he was never really integrated into the rest of the street, instead he just played a part in other character's storylines. When Mellor was not allowed three months off to join a touring theatre production, he realised that it was time to leave. Mellor added that it was "a shame" Matt would not get an exit storyline, but as he is not being killed off, there was a chance he could return in the future.

== Storylines ==
Natasha Blakeman (Rachel Leskovac) first sees Matt and confides in him that she has just had an abortion. She tells him that she does not want her partner, Nick Tilsley (Ben Price) to know and he promises to keep her secret, even when Nick introduces himself as the baby's father. Matt overhears Natasha and Gail McIntyre (Helen Worth), who is Nick's mother and the medical centre's receptionist, arguing. He hears Natasha accuse Gail of hacking into her medical records and she admits it, insisting Nick should be told the truth, thereby breaking the rule of patient confidentiality. He immediately sacks Gail and Natasha leaves.

Whilst Matt is having a drink in The Rovers, an explosion occurs at the Joinery Bar, causing a tram to crash on to the street. Matt takes charge of the casualties and tends the wounded, treating many residents, including Sunita Alahan (Shobna Gulati). He helps Fiz Stape (Jennie McAlpine) when they realise that she is going into premature labour until an ambulance arrives. He offers Claire Peacock (Julia Haworth) mental health advice after she discovers that her husband Ashley Peacock (Steven Arnold) has died in the accident.

Some weeks later, John Stape (Graeme Hawley), visits Matt after being unable to sleep. Matt assumes that John's inability to sleep is due to the stress and worries of having a premature baby but John admits that it is his guilty conscience which is weighing him down. After prescribing sleeping pills, Matt suggests that John speaks to a councillor but he refuses. John visits Matt again the following week where he appears to be unstable following his actions. Matt suggests that John puts his guilt into perspective, before giving him a stronger prescription. Matt visits Peter Barlow (Chris Gascoyne) at his home after Peter takes a fall while recovering from the injuries sustained from the events of the tram crash. Matt has an awkward incident with Sunita's aunts who are trying to find her a new husband. They invite him around to Number 7 after claiming one of them is ill. Sunita and her husband Dev Alahan (Jimmi Harkishin) return and are shocked and embarrassed by her aunts' behaviour. Matt begins dating Tina McIntyre (Michelle Keegan), much to the annoyance of Tommy Duckworth (Chris Fountain), who becomes jealous of him. However, Tina later dumps and humiliates Matt when he expects too much of her. He later tends to Kylie Platt (Paula Lane) when she fakes illness so her sister, Becky McDonald (Katherine Kelly) can access his computer to print off Tracy Barlow's (Kate Ford) medical records.

Eileen Grimshaw (Sue Cleaver) enlists the help of Matt, along with several other male residents, to perform in a charity strip routine at the Bistro. The performance is cut short by the announcement of a fire at The Rovers. Matt later discusses Paul Kershaw's (Tony Hirst) state of mind with Eileen when he goes to book a taxi at StreetCars. Matt later runs into Eileen and tells her that he is going to have a chat with Paul. Matt offers to give Paul a sick note, but Paul is defensive and forces Matt to leave. A few days later, Rita Tanner (Barbara Knox), Dennis Tanner (Philip Lowrie), Sylvia Goodwin (Stephanie Cole) and Roy Cropper (David Neilson) come to Matt to talk about cannabis. Roy and Rita want Matt to educate Dennis and Sylvia and Matt explains that there could be long-term side effects to using the drug. He then tells Sylvia and Dennis to come along to his pain clinic later in the week.

== Reception ==
A Virgin Media writer called Matt a "hunky doctor". Inside Soap readers voted Matt their favourite doctor in soap opera in August 2011.
