= Zack Loveday =

UK soap opera character, created 2015

- Hollyoaks character
- Portrayed by: Duayne Boachie
- Duration: 2015–2019
- First appearance: 24 February 2015
- Last appearance: 23 January 2019
- Introduced by: Bryan Kirkwood
In-universe information
- Occupation: Student
- Father: Louis Loveday
- Mother: Simone Loveday
- Sisters: Lisa Loveday
- Half-brothers: Daniel Lomax
- Grandfathers: Walter Deveraux
- Grandmothers: Gloria Deveraux
- Aunts: Martine Deveraux; Melanie Deveraux
- First cousins: Mitchell Deveraux; Toby Faroe; Celeste Faroe
- Other relatives: Wilfred Deveraux

Zack Loveday is a fictional character from the British Channel 4 soap opera Hollyoaks, played by Duayne Boachie. The character made his first on-screen appearance on 24 February 2015. The show's producer Bryan Kirkwood had created the Loveday family to reintroduce the "domestic family warmth" it had lost. Billed as a "close-knit family", writers also created a series of secrets they character group would be hiding upon their introduction. The audition process for the role of Zack was long and Boachie had various auditions, call backs and screen tests with other actors. Jacqueline Boatswain and Karl Collins were cast as Zack's parents Simone and Louis Loveday respectively. Zack is characterised as a cheeky and charming person who wants to find love. He is sporty and a keen football player.

One of the first storylines for the character was the revelation Zack's sister, Lisa, was abducted fourteen years prior to their arrival. Kiza Deen was brought into the show to play the character, but writers introduced a surprise twist in the story where she is revealed to be an impostor named Sonia Albright. Zack is first to discover her deception and they begin a relationship. Simone and Louis learn the truth later on and they forbid their romance. The show later introduced Zack's actual long-lost sister with Rachel Adedeji in the role. A character completely different from Sonia, Lisa is fixated on revenge against Sonia and ensuring Zack stays away from her. This causes a feud between Zack and Lisa. Other storylines include a romance with long-standing character Theresa McQueen (Jorgie Porter), and sleeping with Simone's best friend Joanne Cardsley (Rachel Leskovac). For his portrayal of the character Boache has been nominated for a "Best Newcomer" award.

Boachie, Boatswain and Collins all decided to leave Hollyoaks at the same time to pursue other acting projects. Zack made his final appearance on 23 January 2019 alongside Simone, departing to Paris to be with Holly Cunningham (Amanda Clapham).

== Creation and casting ==
In November 2014, Hollyoaks' producer Bryan Kirkwood revealed that he planned to introduce a new family into the show. He said that the Loveday family were in the early stages of planning but wanted them to "bring domestic family warmth" which he believed had been missing from Hollyoaks. He had already cast the actors and confirmed their arrival in early 2015. He added that Zack would be introduced to increase the number of teenage characters studying at the show's sixth form college.

On 10 February 2015, Boachie's casting was publicised and Kirkwood stated "Duayne Boachie is a brilliant new talent and strengthens the group of teens that we currently have in sixth form." Jacqueline Boatswain and Karl Collins were cast as Zack's parents Simone and Louis Loveday respectively. The Lovedays were billed as a "close-knit family" who arrive when Simone decides to take over the village's local shop, Price Slice. Zack made his first appearance on 24 February 2015.

Boachie auditioned for a separate project produced by Lime Pictures, who also make Hollyoaks. The casting director on that particular project remembered Boachie and contact his agent with audition information. The actor decided to attend the audition but when he received more information about Zack he realised how much he wanted the role. He has said that he really focused and tried to commit to each audition. The process of casting was long-winded and following numerous auditions and call-backs. He also had screen-tests alongside other actors but has stated that he felt a connection when grouped with Boatswain and Collins. Boatswain had screen tests with four different actors, including Boachie, who were being considered to play Zack. Boachie was later selected for the role and he then relocated to Liverpool to begin filming for the show. Boachie said he was excited to join Hollyoaks and eager to bring the character to life. He added "I've been working towards this for a long time."

== Development ==
=== Characterisation ===
"Zack is an alpha male, who turns heads on and off the footie pitch. Yep, when he isn’t scoring goals, he’s acing tests and breaking hearts with a dazzling smile. This guy sails through life, smoother than the Savages’ boat down the Dee, with a cheeky wink and charming one-liners."

Zack is characterised as a "ladies man" who is often portrayed looking for love with female characters. He is academically gifted and a skilled football player. His cheeky charm allows him to seemingly "sail through life". Boachie told Daniel Kilkelly from Digital Spy that his character is "full of energy and love, but there's a lot of banter from him as well." He likes to joke around and have a laugh with others, but never in a malicious way. He revealed that Zack "despises bullies" and is willing to stand-up against bullying. His main aim is to "have fun and enjoy himself." Zack is a "cool guy" who tries to find the positive from any situation he is placed in. He is also "very vocal about his opinions".

His relationship with his mother Simone is a close one; she is firm and strict with Zack, but he knows how to bring out her soft characteristics. Zack "is very good at deflecting situations" and will often blame his father Louis for wrongdoings. Louis is the deputy headmaster at the school Zack attends but this does not cause problems for him. This is because the pair have a "very easy and very genuine" relationship. Collins said that Zack is not embarrassed about his father's profession and proud of him. He added that Louis is a character that Zack "looks up to". Boachie also revealed that the Lovedays tackled various problems in their past which has made them a close-knit family. They all shared a "very good relationship". He also revealed that the trio were hiding a secret which would be revealed in later stories. Zack quickly forms a friendship with fellow character Harry Thompson (Parry Glasspool). Boachie said that they are "both sporty, athletic and they love football in particular. That's something that makes them click."

=== Family secret ===
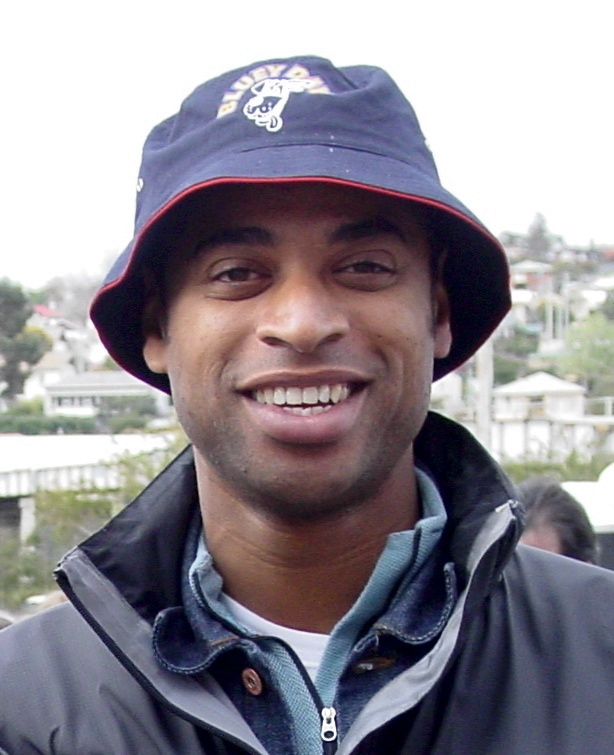
Karl Collins plays Zack's father Louis Loveday

The secret that Boachie previously disclosed began to unravel on-screen during May 2015. When Simone browses through old family pictures, Zack reacts negatively and argues with her. Their confrontation results in Zack blaming Simone for their problems and her slapping him in retaliation. The following month, it was revealed that Simone and Louis have a missing daughter named Lisa. It is revealed that she was abducted from her school and had been missing for fourteen years. Boachie told Kilkelly that the storyline had been planned from the family's creation. The actor was delighted and nervous for the opportunity to be involved in a "big story" and wanted to make it as accurate to reality as possible. Zack was three years old when she went missing and cannot remember Lisa. Boachie said that his character had "grown up in the shadow" of his missing sister's memory. Zack is such a positive character that he had been determined not to let the situation ruin his life. He gains aspirations for a career and a better future. Zack's turmoil does not relate to Lisa's disappearance in the way it affected his parents. Witnessing Louis and Simone constantly upset affected him more and subsequently made him always eager to please them. Boatswain added "Zack has been under scrutiny with them a lot. They've made sure that he does well at school and that he's high-achieving. He's felt the pressure of being the one left behind."

Zack is annoyed with Simone moping about her disappearance because the family had moved to Hollyoaks for a fresh start. When local villagers find out about Lisa, fellow character Tegan Lomax's (Jessica Ellis) daughter goes missing. Suspicious arise that Simone and Louis may be involved and people gossip about the Lovedays. Boachie explained that "it frustrates him a lot. He sees his family breaking down and it really affects him. Zack feels that if Simone and Louis are breaking down, then he has to step up and take control of the situation instead." Zack feels betrayed by his friends for talking about his family. He then discovers that Simone has been trying to find Lisa in secret creating more suspicion from authorities. Boachie concluded that the story had been successful with viewers who deemed it "interesting" and "appealing". Louis and Simone consider leaving Hollyoaks to escape the gossip. The actor told an Inside Soap writer that Zack is "disappointed" with his parents because he thought the village was an ideal place for their future. Zack's friends start a "find Lisa" flash mob to support the Lovedays which changes their mind. Boachie added that Zack has always "felt alone" but he is "touched" by the newfound support from his friends.

The show soon introduced Kiza Deen in the role of Lisa. The actress revealed that Lisa's reintroduction into the Loveday family would be welcomed by Zack. He does not find the situation weird because his parents always behaved as though there was something missing. Deen believed that Zack is happy because he presumes they "can be a full family now and everything can be good." Unlike Simone and Louis who suspect a Lisa's identity, Zack had no reservations about Lisa being his sister. Boachie explained that Zack had not really known Lisa and therefore cannot suspect anything is wrong. In a later part of the story Zack believes Lisa is trying to con his family. He sees her kissing Wayne (Nathan Whitfield). Boatswain explained that Zack does not suspect her identity, but her motives and fears she wants money. In scenes that were kept a secret until transmission, Lisa was revealed to be an imposter fooling the Loveday family. Her real identity is revealed to be Sonia Albright and she knows the actual Lisa Loveday. Despite this, the Zack and his family remain unaware of her deception.

=== Relationships with Theresa McQueen and Sonia Albright ===
Writers created Zack's first romance alongside long-standing character Theresa McQueen (Jorgie Porter), having shown an attraction to her during his debut episode. Zack invites Theresa to his eighteenth birthday party and they share a kiss. Theresa later annoys Sonia by stealing from her place of work and letting her take the blame. When her family need money, Theresa secretly accepts a nude modelling job and lies to Zack. Sonia learns the truth and confronts Theresa over her lies. But when Theresa's photographer lauds raunchy photographs over her, Sonia decides to help out by stealing the pictures for Theresa. Zack becomes concerned that his relationship with Theresa is solely about sex. Sonia tries to convince Zack that Theresa is using him. Zack then decides he wants a serious relationship with her and declares his love to a shocked Theresa.

The show soon planned a break-up for the two characters. They played Zack being unfaithful with family friend Joanne Cardsley (Rachel Leskovac) and Theresa catches them together. Boachie branded his character "devastated" to have been caught with Joanne. Zack had never wanted to be the type of man who cheated on their partner. So "he really does want to make it work with her, but his apologies get him no where." Theresa then threatens to tell everyone that he has slept with Joanne.

Writers devised a surprise storyline in which Sonia would develop romantic feelings for despite posing as his sister. When Zack tells her that he hopes to find a girlfriend with a similar personality, she kisses Zack. He is horrified by her actions and she if forced to reveal that she has been lying about her identity. Zack is upset by the lengths Sonia has gone to in order to deceive his family and vows to reveal her secret to Simone and Louis. When Sonia's sister Jade Albright (Kassius Nelson) collapses, Zack supports her and delays telling the truth. He later kisses Sonia suggesting he has feelings for her too. Boachie believed that his character's "heart lies" with Sonia. He viewed the split with Theresa as an ideal opportunity for the show to explore a romance between Zack and Sonia. But the fact that his parents' still believe she is his daughter, the relationship had to remain secret. Boachie added "I think Zack just needs to follow his heart and stop getting confused with all these different women, but ultimately he just wants love. He wants a strong relationship like his parents Louis and Simone have." The actor later reflected on the relationship, stating that Zack would have never viewed Sonia romantically if they were related. He added "things changed big time" when he learned the truth.

The pair begin an affair but are later caught kissing by Simone and Louis. They are disgusted and Zack reveals the truth about Sonia. They threaten to call the police and Sonia reveals that Lisa is still alive. Simone hits Zack out of disgust, Boatswain said that Simone wants Sonia out of their lives and believed the storyline "opened a whole other can of worms" for the Lovedays. A Hollyoaks publicist stated that "they've grown so close these last few months but she can’t get away with what she’s done to his family." Sonia tells Zack that she knew Lisa and that she had since died. He learns that she is still alive which causes trouble between them. Deen told Laura Morgan from All About Soap that she believed Zack may never forgive Sonia for that lie. She added that she was annoyed that writers were breaking Zack and Lisa up so often. She was also unsure of whether she wanted them to reunite because Zack dumped the character too many times. Deen would have preferred Zack to "man-up and fight" for Lisa. Deen later told Soaplife's Sally Brockaway that Sonia wants to believe that her love for Zack is strong enough to overcome their problems.

Zack later begins a university course and Boachie believed it was a "new journey" for the character following a "manic and crazy" period of the character's life. He added that Zack would remain living with the Lovedays because "he feels a responsibility to be there and be the manly figure in the house." University does not affect his relationship with Sonia. He "embraces" the journey to university but never loses sight of his love for Sonia.

=== Feud with sister ===
In March 2016, it was announced that the show planned to introduce the genuine Lisa Loveday, played by former The X Factor contestant, Rachel Adedeji. The story played out when Zack and Sonia help Joanne find Margaret who abducted Lisa. They confront her and have the police arrest her for her crimes. When Lisa arrives she is unable to forgive Sonia for impersonating her and becomes fixated on destroying her life. Adedeji told Kerry Bennett from All About Soap that "She wants everyone to be on her side, especially Zack. She's not happy that he's carrying on with Sonia – she doesn't want that to be happening at all! In fact, she has moments with Sonia that are pretty unpleasant." She argues with Sonia and then frames her for smashing up Simone's shop. Lisa is also keen to prevent Zack and Sonia from getting back together. Zack discovers the lengths that Lisa has gone to in order to belittle Sonia. He is angry and threatens to turn Louis and Simone against her. He also makes it clear that his loyalty lies with Sonia and not her. Boachie later told Morgan that Zack "feels weird" because he is torn between his lover and his sister, forming a "strange loyalty triangle." Zack wants to get on with his life and university work, but "Lisa isn't going to make it easy."

=== Departure ===
The characters of Zack, Simone and Louis were all written out of Hollyoaks during January 2019. Off-screen Boachie, Boatswain and Collins had collectively decided to leave the show to pursue other projects. Zack's exit story follows his decision to move abroad to Paris to be with Holly. Simone also decides to leave the village and return to Jamaica, while Louis was murdered by serial killer Breda McQueen (Moya Brady). Adedeji, who plays Lisa, decided to remain in the show. Producers introduced further relatives of Simone's to coincide with their exits, including her younger sister Martine Deveraux (Kéllé Bryan), their father and local priest Walter Deveraux (Trevor A. Toussaint) and Martine's son, Mitchell Deveraux (Imran Adams). Boatswain claimed that she and her co-stars were being offered other work elsewhere from Hollyoaks and that they wanted to take those opportunities.

== Reception ==
For his portrayal of Zack, Boachie was nominated for "Best Newcomer" at the 2016 British Soap Awards. In August 2017, Boachie was longlisted for Sexiest Male at the Inside Soap Awards. He did not progress to the viewer-voted shortlist. Susan Hill from the Daily Star branded Zack a "hunky" character. A reporter from Reveal named Simone and Louis catching Zack kissing Sonia as a "soap highlight" for the day it aired.
