= Losing Gemma =

2006 film

- Genre: Crime drama Thriller
- Written by: Robert Murphy
- Directed by: Maurice Phillips
- Starring: Jonas Armstrong; Alice Eve; Jason Flemyng; Rachel Leskovac; Koel Purie; Rhian Grundy; Dan Husain
- Country of origin: United Kingdom
- Original language: English
- No. of series: 1
- No. of episodes: 2 (list of episodes)

Production
- Executive producer: Andy Harries
- Producer: Shefali Malhoutra
- Production location: India
- Running time: 90 minutes (per episode)
- Production company: Granada Television

Original release
- Network: ITV
- Release: 18 December – 19 December 2006

Losing Gemma is a two-part British television thriller, based on the debut novel by Writer Katy Gardner. The screen adaptation was written by Robert Murphy, directed by Maurice Phillips and starred Jonas Armstrong, Alice Eve, Jason Flemyng and Rachel Leskovac. It originally aired on ITV on 18 and 19 December 2006, at 9pm. The plot centres on the disappearance of the eponymous Gemma (Leskovac) after she goes backpacking with friend Esther (Eve) in India. When Esther returns from the trip alone, she is haunted by the belief that Gemma's disappearance is her fault, but mystery surrounds what really happened. Notably, the drama has never been released on DVD.

== Cast ==
- Jonas Armstrong as Steve
- Alice Eve as Esther
- Jason Flemyng as Zac
- Rachel Leskovac as Gemma
- Koel Purie as Coral
- Rhian Grundy as Karen
- Dan Husain as Inspector Sharif
- Sanjeev Kohli as Paddy Singh
- Suhasini Mulay as Mrs Shastri

== Plot ==
=== Part 1 ===
- Aired: 18 December 2006. Viewing figures: 5.98m.

Unlikely travel partners Esther (Alice Eve) and Gemma (Rachel Leskovac) are thrown together when their mutual friend, Karen, has an accident on the eve of their trip. Adventurous loner Esther hopes to part company once in India, but needy Gemma is terrified of travelling alone. Gemma's money bag gets stolen and Coral returns it to her while on the train. She causes great friction between Gemma and Esther, and provokes several fights. Her husband Zac (Jason Flemyng) takes an instant liking to Gemma, and invites her for a cruise on his boat with him and his wife. Gemma requests that Esther be invited and reluctantly the couple agree. They spend the day on the boat sunbathing and relaxing. But Gemma is taken aback when Coral and Zac get naked and start having sex in the water.

Esther begs to be taken back to the dock with Gemma, but is mocked and told it was her choice to come, that she is outnumbered as the other three want to stay and she will have to wait till they're all ready to leave. They end up on a deserted island where Coral and Zac have rented a house and are taken deep into the forest to find it. Esther, becoming increasingly uncomfortable, pulls Gemma aside and begs her to leave together as she doesn't trust them, to which Gemma tells her off for trusting no one. They find themselves at an exotic Indian house decorated with strange masks. The girls are shown to the rooms where they will be sleeping, and while Esther is alone, she discovers a photo which Gemma gave her earlier, seeing Zak in the photo staring at Gemma and realizes they have been following Gemma; that this entire thing has been a set-up. She rushes to Gemma's bedroom only to have Coral open the door and tell her to go downstairs and wait for her and Gemma, hearing a muffled noise of agreement from Gemma in the background. Esther walks downstairs to find Zac in the kitchen, stabbing a chopping board repeatedly while talking to her, making her extremely nervous.

Finally Gemma comes downstairs, all dressed up in Indian finery. The four sit outside for dinner and drink wine (which Zac mentions has been drugged), making Esther very dizzy (as the viewer can tell from the blurry camera screen). Zac approaches Gemma, saying he has something very important to tell her, and she willingly accompanies him down some stairs to a beautifully Indian-decorated room. Esther eventually joins them, stumbling along. She listens while Zac tells Gemma about how he and Carol love her and want her to join their "family". Gemma happily accepts and hugs Coral when Zac tells her to. Esther becomes very agitated and pulls out the photo, showing it to Gemma while telling her how Zac and Coral targeted her, stalked her and stole her money bag so they could return it and become her friend. Zac invents lies to explain away these "coincidences", and Gemma turns on Esther, calling her jealous and otherwise insulting her. Esther slaps her and Gemma falls to the floor, hitting her head on a table. She appears to be unconscious. Coral rushes to her side while Esther runs for the door. Zac chases her but loses her in the thick brush. Esther collapses on the beach and later wakes up to police surrounding her. She is taken to prison after the police determine she killed Coral, whose body was found with multiple stab wounds. The first part ends with Esther whimpering in jail.

=== Part 2 ===
- Aired: 19 December 2006. Viewing figures: 4.87m.

The interrogator comes in and begins trying to make Esther confess. He throws down the photos of Coral while telling her how she was stabbed 6 times with a large serrated object. He is adamant she killed her. The scene switches to Gemma talking to Esther, telling her how she can't help her and that Esther is on her own. Then it's back to Esther waking up in her jail bed, making the viewer unsure if the previous scene was real. Her new lawyer enters, and as they start speaking, the scene cuts to Esther being allowed to make a phone call. She calls hers and Gemma's mutual friend, Karen, who explains that she is physically unable to come to India because her leg is fractured and in a plaster cast, and Esther tells her that she's in prison, but the phone goes dead at that moment. Esther tries to dial the number again but the officer grabs it out of her hand and she is dragged from the room. The next scene is of Gemma in a room with Zac, who is instructing her to do something but he won't specify what. He hands her a pair of scissors and leaves for work.

The scene cuts back to Esther being yelled at by the prison interrogator, who is interrupted by her lawyer. She has been granted bail and leaves the prison after being handed a card which has on it the name of the person who posted her bond. She is met by Steve who was sent by Coral. He takes her to a hotel and they discuss ways of finding Gemma. The next day they go to the house of the person who posted Esther's bail, who turns out to be Coral's mother. She tells Esther that Coral was taken by a man who sent obscene pictures, and demanded money every week. Coral's mother paid the money faithfully until he asked for too much. One week later Coral turned up dead. Steve and Esther run into the city to look for signs of Gemma and eventually find online the photo Gemma originally gave Esther. Esther rings her lawyer and tries to send the photo to him but his server is down and won't receive it. Instead she returns to the hotel and faxes the photo to her lawyer.

The camera cuts back to Gemma, who has been told by Zac that she knows what needs to be done, and that he loves her, and again hands her the scissors. He kisses her goodbye and tells her he will allow her to go shopping if she does what he wants her to do. She promises to do it, and he leaves for work. Esther falls apart in Steve's arms and they end up kissing and sleeping together. The next morning Steve receives a text from the lawyer and leaves while Esther is in the bathroom. When she catches up with Steve, he tells her that their night together was a mistake, because he loves Gemma. She goes off at Steve about what Gemma is really like and he walks away. Later they meet back up and together go to the address of the house where she and Gemma were taken. Intermittently, flashes of Gemma crying and cutting off her hair are shown. Esther jumps out of the taxi and chases who she thinks is Gemma but once she sees the dark, short hair, she thinks she has failed. The person turns around and it is Gemma. She is terrified and refuses to go to the police, and runs away into the crowd while Steve and Esther are fighting.

They find her back at Zac's house, and he returns while Gemma slowly packs to leave. There is a struggle and Steve kills Zac by pushing him off a ledge. Gemma and Steve invent a story about how it was self-defense and then go to the police. Gemma signs the statement she's made against Zac. Esther is released and they all meet Gemma's parents at a hotel. Esther's jailer meets her at the hotel and harasses her into telling him what really happened with Zac. The viewers find out Gemma rang Zac from a phone booth after running away from Esther and Steve, and that she's been lying the whole time about it. She refuses to tell Steve until they get back home. Gemma admits to Esther she killed Coral, after Esther guesses the truth. Gemma says it's all Esther's fault and Esther responds by calling Gemma evil after being manipulated by her. Esther knows the police won't believe her if she tells them it was Gemma all along, especially since Gemma swears she will act dumb and dizzy if they arrest her, so Esther takes her bags and leaves.
