= Oliver Mellor =

British actor

- Occupations: Actor, personal trainer
- Years active: 2003–present
- Spouse: Rhian Sugden (m. 2018)

Oliver Mellor is a British actor and former personal trainer, playing the role of Dr Matt Carter in ITV soap opera Coronation Street from 2010 to 2013.

== Career ==
Between 2003 and 2005 Mellor appeared many times on stage, starring in productions such as Twelve Angry Men, Cyrano de Bergerac, The Man of Mode and Pericles, Prince of Tyre.

On television Mellor appeared in the Doctor Who episode "Army of Ghosts" in 2006 as Torchwood Institute employee Matt in the penultimate episode featuring Billie Piper. In that same year he appeared as Det. Monroe in late night Hollyoaks spin-off Hollyoaks: In The City and as Dr. Fitzgerald in ITV's The Royal.

In 2007 he appeared in BBC soap EastEnders in the role of Geoff. In the same year he guest-starred in three episodes of ITV soap Emmerdale as Ricky Walsh as well as playing Matt in an episode of the second series of E4 drama Skins. The episode entitled Tony was broadcast on 17 March and focused on the character played by Nicholas Hoult. In 2008 he guest starred in BBC daytime soap Doctors as Jack Smith in the episode Love Will Find a Way. In February 2011 he guest-starred in an episode of Midsomer Murders playing the character Julian Woodley in the episode "Fit For Murder". The episode was broadcast on 2 February.

Mellor played the recurring character of Dr Matt Carter in ITV soap opera Coronation Street between 2010 and 2013. He signed for an initial four episodes during the exit storyline of Natasha Blakeman and made his first appearance in the role on 20 August 2010. He then made further appearances which included firing Gail Platt from her job as medical centre receptionist for breaching the rules of patient confidentiality. He appeared during the soap's 50th anniversary week providing medical care and first aid to those injured by the tram accident. He appeared in the one-hour live episode which aired Thursday 9 December. He appeared again on 27 December 2010 briefly giving medical advice to John Stape. He appeared occasionally on screen throughout January and February 2011 during storylines involving John Stape and Peter Barlow. It was announced that he quit the show in June 2013; however, the character didn't have an on-screen exit and hasn't been seen on the show since April 2013. In 2011 Mellor took part in a charity challenge from Get On Africa where he learnt to ride motorbikes to deliver lifesaving medical support in the mountainous and remote villages of Lesotho with other celebrities including his Coronation Street co-star Shobna Gulati.

== Personal life ==
Mellor grew up in Windsor, Berkshire with his father, a hotelier, his mother, a flight attendant and his older sister. He graduated from the Webber Douglas Academy of Dramatic Art in summer 2005. Before he became an actor, Mellor was a personal trainer and a former county rugby player where he suffered many injuries. He enjoys sports including fencing, fishing, rugby, skiing, snowboarding, and running.

In 2014, Mellor spoke of his affair with Coronation Street co-star Kym Marsh, who was then married to Hollyoaks actor Jamie Lomas. He described it as "real" and "(not) just a careless fling." Marsh and Lomas later divorced.

In 2018, Mellor married British glamour model Rhian Sugden. In November 2023, the couple announced they were expecting their first child together. The news came after they had spent six years trying to get pregnant with IVF treatment.

== Credits ==
=== Television ===
Year	Title	Role	Notes
2006	The Royal	Dr. Guy Fitzgerald	
2006	Hollyoaks: In the City	Detective Monroe	Three episodes
2006	Doctor Who	Matt	Episode "Army of Ghosts"
2007	Skins	Matt	Episode "Tony"
2007	Emmerdale	Ricky Walsh	Three episodes
2007	EastEnders	Geoff	
2009	Doctors	Jack Smith	
2010–13	Coronation Street	Dr Matt Carter	Recurring character
2011	Midsomer Murders	Julian Woodley	
2014	Father Brown (2013 TV series)	Walter MacMurray	Episode "The Laws of Motion"
2015	Get Your Act Together	Himself/contestant	ITV talent show
2019	Cold Feet	Male therapist 2	Series 8 episode 2

=== Stage ===
Year	Title	Role	Venue
2003	Widows	Captain	Liverpool John Moores University
2003	Cause Celebre	Tony	Webber Douglas Academy of Dramatic Art
2004	Twelve Angry Men	Juror Seven	Webber Douglas Academy of Dramatic Art
2004	Terrorism	Man	Webber Douglas Academy of Dramatic Art
2004	Scenes from an Execution	Urgentino	Webber Douglas Academy of Dramatic Art
2004	Pericles	Pericles	Webber Douglas Academy of Dramatic Art
2004	Man of Mode	Young Bellair	Webber Douglas Academy of Dramatic Art
2004	Cyrano de Bergerac	Cyrano de Bergerac	Webber Douglas Academy of Dramatic Art
2004	The Little Mermaid	Prince Florestan	Sphinx Theatre Co
2013	A Murder Has Been Arranged	Maurice Mullins	Grand Theatre, Wolverhampton
2015	Peter Pan	Peter Pan	Middleton Arena, Manchester

=== Audio ===
Year	Title	Role	Company
2006	Doctor Who: No Man's Land	Private Taylor	Big Finish Productions
2007	Dalek Empire IV: The Fearless	Egan Fisk	Big Finish Productions
