= Rhian Sugden =

Rhian Sugden, British model

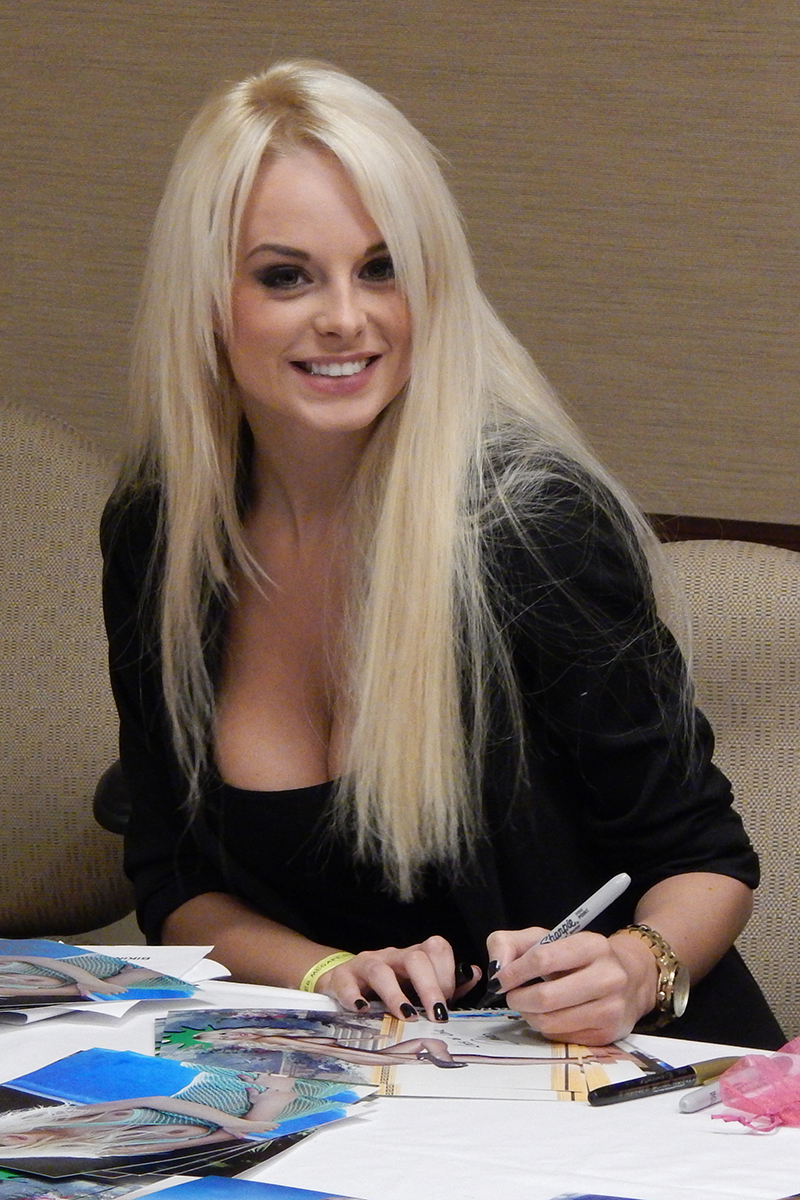
- Sugden signing autographs at Boston Megafest, November 2013
- Born: Rhian Marie Sugden; 11 September 1986 (age 40); Radcliffe, Bury, England
- Occupations: Glamour model; actress
- Years active: 2006–present
- Spouse: Oliver Mellor (m. 2018)
- Modeling information
- Height: 5 ft 7 in (170 cm)
- Hair color: Brown/Blonde
- Eye color: Brown

Rhian Sugden is an English glamour model and actor.

== Early life ==
Rhian was born on 11 September 1986 in Radcliffe, Greater Manchester, England. She went to the Coney Green High School in Radcliffe.

== Career ==
Rhian went to a photoshoot to boost her confidence. She was signed by Samantha Bond's model agency, Girl Management, in London, at age 18 in the Summer of 2006. The agency is known for having Jordan (Katie Price) as one if its clients. The agency signed Rhian on the strength of the images from the photoshoot. She left her job in Bury to go into the world of glamour modelling. She said in an interview: "I just fancied a change so I dyed my hair blonde and I’ve always had quite large breasts, so I was told I should try and get into it."

She was a regular Page 3 girl in the The Sun and Daily Star tabloid newspapers. She has also appeared in the main British Lads magazines, Nuts, Zoo, and Loaded.

Rhian was a model in a campaign by the Male Cancer Awareness Campaign (MCAC) to promote the diagnosis of testicular cancer in 2011. The film was directed by English photographer Rankin. She also fronted modelling campaigns for the likes of Ann Summers, Lynx, and Pot Noodle as the "Siren".

After her stint as a Page 3 Girl and the demise of the Lads Mag, Rhian modelled for the MayContainGirl, OnlyTease, and BodyInMind websites. She currently is a creator for the subscription website OnlyFans.

== Television appearances ==
Rhian made her first TV appearance in 2008 on BBC Three "Behind the scenes" documentary series "Glamour Girls". This followed Rhian's life and photo shoots around the country whilst with Samantha Bond's model agency.

Rhian went on Channel Five's Celebrity Big Brother series 10 in August 2012. She entered the house alongside other celebrities such as Julian Clary, Colleen Nolan, MC Harvey and Julie Goodyear. She was evicted after 15 days and finished 11th.

== Filmography ==
- Your Highness (2011) as "Forest Woman"
- Top Dog as "Waitress"

== Controversies ==
In 2010, broadcaster Vernon Kay was forced to apologise to his then wife Tess Daly, after it was revealed in the British press that he had been sending texts and social media messages to Rhian every day for four months. Rhian has also apologised to Tess Daly, saying that the exchange of messages was inappropriate and disrespectful.

In 2018, she received criticism after posting a selfie at the Memorial to the Murdered Jews of Europe in Berlin with the caption "ET phone home". She later removed the caption but defended taking the photograph.

Rhian had breast reduction surgery in 2025 to ease years of back pain and body discomfort. Her breast size increased after her pregnancy. After the operation, she went from a HH cup to E cup size, having 500 grammes removed from each breast. Unfortunately, Rhian had to respond to online trolls, including OnlyFans subscribers, who criticized her decision. Sugden said that she should not have to justify what she does with her own body.

== Personal life ==
She is married to actor Oliver Mellor. They have a child after spending six years and several rounds of IVF treatment trying to get pregnant.
