= Natasha Blakeman =

Fictional character from Coronation Street

- Coronation Street character
- Portrayed by: Rachel Leskovac
- Duration: 2008–2010, 2020–2021
- First appearance: 12 May 2008
- Last appearance: 25 October 2021
- Introduced by: Steve Frost (2008); Iain MacLeod (2020)
In-universe information
- Occupation: Hairdresser
- Sisters: Melissa Blakeman
- Sons: Sam Blakeman
- Nieces: Electra Blakeman

Natasha Blakeman is a fictional character from the British ITV soap opera Coronation Street, played by Rachel Leskovac. The character first appeared onscreen during the episode airing on 12 May 2008. On 29 April 2010, it was announced that Leskovac had been axed from the show after two years and would depart in "an exciting and dramatic storyline which will be an integral part of the build-up to Coronation Street's 50th anniversary". Natasha departed on 27 September 2010.

On 16 July 2020, it was announced that Leskovac would be reprising her role as Natasha, with her return airing 11 September 2020. Leskovac made an unannounced departure from the soap on 25 October 2021, in which Natasha was killed off after being shot by Harvey Gaskell (Will Mellor).

== Development ==
=== Casting ===
Rachel Leskovac was to take on the role, with a Coronation Street spokesman confirming it: "Rachel's very well known in TV land as she has been in countless series and dramas. To have her new character in the salon is a smashing coup." The actress stated in an interview that she only felt really part of the backstage family when her character became more involved with central storylines saying: "Last year, it was a bit sporadic because I wasn't in for weeks on end, so every time I came back it felt like my first day again. It's only now in the new year that it's started to feel like I'm part of the family!".

=== Characterisation ===
In an interview, Leskovac said: "I'd say Natasha's a romantic. She likes to have fun and isn't malicious in the slightest. She loves her job, too. I think she's looking for love but not necessarily settling down at the minute, though.". Her take on the character she plays after one year in the show. The character tends to talk a lot and generally say anything that comes into her head. ITV publicity describe the characters typical ditzy blonde image, describe her as loving Scottish accents and the sound of her own voice and hating shellfish and dandruff.

=== Reintroduction ===
In July 2020, it was confirmed that Natasha had been reintroduced by executive producer Iain McLeod. Natasha returned in September 2020 after being away for over ten years. Speaking about her return, Leskovac said: "I am very excited and proud to be welcomed back to Coronation Street, especially as so many old friends are still there. It's always great to be able to return to a character to explore a whole new path for them.

== Storylines ==
In December 2008, Natasha informs Audrey Roberts (Sue Nicholls) that her brother and sister-in-law have just had a baby daughter and are naming her Electra.

She spots a good business opportunity in opening the salon for late night trading hours during the week, an idea Audrey agrees to. Natasha is drafted in to style Molly Compton's (Vicky Binns) hair for her wedding day in January 2009.

In February, she flirts with Steve McDonald (Simon Gregson) in the Rovers and they go on a date but Steve is jealous that Jason Grimshaw (Ryan Thomas) is dating Becky Granger (Katherine Kelly) and behaves quite badly during his and Natasha's date. She is not impressed by Steve as his idea of a date is a takeaway in the Rovers so when Steve asks her out again, she declines but tells him that there are no hard feelings.

On 23 March 2009, Natasha starts a relationship with Tony Gordon (Gray O'Brien) and initially, Natasha does most of the talking, while Tony sits silently. Just as she is about to leave, he asks her to stop and take her coat off and the pair subsequently have sex. Natasha is in good spirits, following her night with Tony, and tells Maria Connor (Samia Smith) about it, making Maria jealous as she is developing romantic feelings for Tony herself. Maria tries to warn Natasha off him, claiming that he will treat her badly and even tries setting her up with Tom Kerrigan (Philip McGinley) but Natasha is happy with Tony. Some months later, Natasha becomes suspicious of the amount of time that Tony and Maria are spending together. A jealous Natasha tells Maria that Tony is only paying her attention because he feels sorry for her. Tony is furious when he discovers what Natasha has said, leading to a showdown between them and they split up. Natasha tries to warn Maria about Tony's 'dark side', but she won't listen.

In April 2010, Natasha finds herself attracting the attention of Graeme Proctor (Craig Gazey). She is amused at his attempts to woo her until she discovers that he is doing the same with Rosie Webster (Helen Flanagan). They agree to teach him a lesson. Natasha feigns interest in Graeme and meets him for a drink at The Rovers, where she playfully flirts with him. When she asks him about Rosie, he states that she is a bimbo and that he has no interest in her. At that moment, Rosie comes up behind him and pours a pint over his head, much to the amusement of the pub. Later that month, Natasha sets her sights on Audrey's grandson Nick Tilsley (Ben Price) and he agrees to go out with her, after she makes her interest in him clear. However, after he cancels several dates, she angrily confronts him and he is impressed by her feisty personality, making him take their relationship more seriously but Natasha soon feels excluded by Nick and his family, firstly as Nick's mother Gail McIntyre's (Helen Worth) is very cold towards her and Nick constantly puts his business before their relationship. Eager to settle down, Natasha suggests they get a place together but Nick is preoccupied with business woes, due to Underworld recently burning down, and virtually ignores her. Worried about his dealings with ex-wife, Leanne Battersby (Jane Danson), she lends him £3,000 for new business premises to secure the future of the factory in an attempt to please him.

In July 2010, while organising a surprise 70th birthday party for Audrey, Natasha discovers that her boss is considering retiring and an ambitious Natasha offers to buy the salon and is not happy to learn that Maria also wants to buy the business. Natasha's insecurity is not helped by Nick's devious half-brother, David Platt (Jack P. Shepherd), telling her that Nick and Maria were once engaged and that she is just one of many women that Nick has been involved with. Despairing at Nick's lack of commitment, her problems worsen when she learns that she is pregnant in August. She is about to tell Nick this but he ends their relationship first as he feels she is too needy. Later, Natasha sees Nick and Leanne together at the factory and angrily tells him about the baby but Nick is angry that she didn't tell him sooner and storms off. Fearing she'd be a single parent, Natasha has an abortion but Nick visits Natasha, telling her that he wants them to be a family. Unsure how to tell him about the termination, she lets him believe that she is still expecting and events spiral out of control when Nick announces her pregnancy in the Rovers. After Natasha steals Fiz Stape's (Jennie McAlpine) scan picture and passes it off as her own, she breaks down and admits the truth to Fiz when she realises what has happened. Seeing how these events are affecting her, Fiz urges her to tell Nick the truth but just as she is about to, Nick asks her to marry him and she agrees, much to Fiz's indignation. However, Gail is suspicious as Natasha's behaviour is not what you'd expect from a pregnant woman and checks her medical records. When she sees Natasha's abortion, she demands either Natasha tell him the truth or she will. Gail doesn't give Natasha much chance to tell Nick before she tells him, causing them to argue. Nick then tells Natasha that she will always be second best to Leanne and demands she move out, resulting in her attempting suicide by taking an overdose of prescription drugs. Feeling guilty about his actions, Nick returns to the flat and, finding her unconscious, calls an ambulance and rushes her to the hospital, where she recovers. Nick tells her he is sorry and that they will try again once she is better. Natasha is discharged from hospital the next morning, and stays with Audrey while she recovers. Nick visits and asks if she wants to try for another baby, much to her surprise and delight. After Nick leaves, Audrey and Natasha have a heart-to-heart and Natasha realises that Nick doesn't love her and is simply trying to make amends for his past behaviour. Knowing that a relationship under those circumstances is doomed, she leaves Audrey's and returns to Coronation Street, wanting revenge on all those who misunderstood or were horrible to her.

During her visit, Natasha berates Leanne for being a catalyst in her break-up with Nick and tells David that Tina McIntyre (Michelle Keegan) will never love him as he has no heart or feelings. She also goes to Underworld and causes chaos by telling the workers about Nick's special "nicknames" for them, and saving best for last, she gets Gail sacked from the Medical Centre in front of Betty Williams (Betty Driver) by revealing to Dr. Matt Carter (Oliver Mellor) how Gail broke the rules of patient confidentiality by hacking into private medical records, her last words to Gail are: "Hope you have a nice life Gail, ooh look, I had my fingers crossed", before leaving. An empowered but tearful Natasha then leaves Weatherfield in the back of a taxi as Nick watches on.

In September 2020, Natasha bumps into Nick while they are both visiting the hospital. She tells him that she is “in a much better place now” and apologised for the past. Later in the day, it is revealed that Natasha now has a son and tells the doctor that she has been reminded of his Dad today, meaning that Nick is his father. The next day, she visits Nick at his flat and reveals that they have a son together called Sam, who was conceived after her abortion. She tries to urge him to see Sam, but Nick is going through a tough time as his step-son with Leanne has a life-threatening condition.

In October 2021, following a long-running feud between Leanne and drug dealer Harvey Gaskell (Will Mellor), Natasha is shot in a case of mistaken identity. Rushed to hospital, she later dies at the age of 40 after internally bleeding during her surgery on her liver before the news is broken to her son, Sam. She is later buried.

== Reception ==
Ruth Deller of entertainment website Lowculture, who runs a monthly column on the most popular and unpopular soap opera characters, including Natasha, attributing her rise in popularity, stating: "A fairly new addition to Weatherfield, Natasha is proving so far very likeable. This could all change, but for now, we’re loving her work." Deborah Ross of The Independent described her as having "trapped a man by pretending to be pregnant" before adding that "Obviously, she cannot think nine months ahead". In 2010, Dan Martin from The Guardian speculated that "Natasha the hairdresser" could be one of the characters to be killed-off in the soap's 50th anniversary special, as he believed that the "primary function of a big soap disaster is to sweep out the dead wood", and that Natasha was one of the "characters we don't care about even if we noticed they were there".

Due to her portrayal of Natasha on Coronation Street, fellow soap opera Hollyoaks executive producer Bryan Kirkwood decided to cast Leskovac as Joanne Cardsley in the soap in September 2015, as he had admired her performances as Natasha.
