= Katy Gardner =

British author and anthropologist (born 1964)

Katy Gardner FBA
- Born: 1964 (age 61–62)
- Education: Cambridge University, London School of Economics
- Occupations: Author, Anthropologist
- Writing career
- Language: English
- Notable work: Losing Gemma

Katy Gardner FBA (born 1964) is a British author and anthropologist, best known for her novel Losing Gemma, which was turned into a two-part miniseries for ITV1 in 2006. Gardner is a graduate of Cambridge University who undertook her doctoral research at the London School of Economics. As well as being the author of four novels, she was for some years a professor of Social Anthropology at Sussex University. In 2013, Gardner returned to the LSE as a professor of anthropology. She was elected a Fellow of the British Academy in 2024.

== Bibliography ==
- Songs at the River's Edge: Stories from a Bangladeshi Village (1991)
- Global Migrants, Local Lives: Travel and Transformation in Rural Bangladesh (2001)
- Losing Gemma (2002)
- Age, narrative and migration: the life course and life histories of Bengali elders in London (2002)
- The Mermaid's Purse (2003)
- Keefer's Rules (2006)
- Hidden (2006)
- Faker (2008)
- Discordant Development: Global Capitalism and the Struggle for Connection in Bangladesh (2012)
