= The Completely Made-Up Adventures of Dick Turpin =

2024 British television series

- Promotional poster
- Genre: Historical comedy
- Created by: Claire Downes; Ian Jarvis; Stuart Lane
- Directed by: Ben Palmer; George Kane
- Starring: Noel Fielding; Duayne Boachie; Ellie White; Marc Wootton; Dolly Wells; Mark Heap; Geoff McGivern; Joe Wilkinson; Kiri Flaherty; Hugh Bonneville; Asim Chaudhry; Tamsin Greig
- Country of origin: United Kingdom
- Original language: English
- No. of seasons: 1
- No. of episodes: 7

Production
- Executive producers: Kenton Allen; Noel Fielding; Victoria Grew; Matthew Justice; Ben Palmer
- Running time: 31–33 minutes
- Production company: Big Talk Studios

Original release
- Network: Apple TV+
- Release: 1 March – 29 March 2024
- Network: Apple TV
- Release: 15 October 2025

The Completely Made-Up Adventures of Dick Turpin is a British historical comedy television series starring Noel Fielding as the title character. Developed by Big Talk Studios, the series premiered on 1 March 2024 on Apple TV+. In July 2024, the series was renewed for a second season. However, in January 2025, the planned second season was scrapped after Fielding pulled out of the series partway through production. The final episode was released on 15 October 2025.

== Premise ==
A fictional take on the life of Dick Turpin, leader of the Essex Gang, who commits numerous petty crimes with the hope of becoming England's greatest highwayman while being pursued by the thief-taker Jonathan Wilde and the secretive criminal organisation The Syndicate.

== Cast and characters ==
=== Main ===
- Noel Fielding as Dick Turpin
- Duayne Boachie as Honesty Barebone
- Ellie White as Elaenor "Nell" Brazier
- Marc Wootton as Moose Pleck
- Dolly Wells as Eliza Bean
- Mark Heap as John Turpin
- Geoff McGivern as Lord Alistair Rookwood
- Joe Wilkinson as Geoffrey the gaoler
- Kiri Flaherty as Little Karen
- Hugh Bonneville as Jonathan Wilde
- Asim Chaudhry as Craig the Warlock
- Tamsin Greig as Lady Helen Gwinear

=== Featured ===
The following cast members have been credited amongst the main cast in a single episode.

- David Threlfall as Tom King
- Greg Davies as Leslie Duvall
- Paul Kaye as Ralph Ratclyff
- Guz Khan as Gow
- Laura Checkley as Sandra
- Diane Morgan as Maureen
- Jessica Hynes as The Reddlehag
- Connor Swindells as Albert Crumb / Tommy Silversides
- Tom Davis as Clive
- Natasia Demetriou as Helga
- Lee Mack as Gordon the driver

=== Recurring ===
- Michael Fielding as Benny Turpin
- Samuel Leakey as Christopher Wilde

=== Guest ===
- Simon Farnaby as Lord Saltley
- Sindhu Vee as Lady Saltley
- Tom Meeten as Bill the Blade
- Neil Edmond as Poorly Martin
- Sutara Gayle as Lizzy the Fish
- Kathryn Hanke as Margaret
- Harry Trevaldwyn as Steven
- Jota Castellano as Alf the Artist
- Philippa Dunne as Slake
- Rich Fulcher as The Unrobbable Coachman
- Juliette Motamed as Abigail
- Henry Lewis as Baron Von Louth
- Liz Kingsman as Baroness Von Louth
- Colin Hoult as Phillip
- Lisa Davina Phillip as Faith Barebone
- Mo Sesay as Courage Barebone
- Flip Webster as Doris the Destroyer
- Justin Sysum as Jack "Iron Fist" Broughton
- Dave Jones as Naked Tony
- Cash Holland as Isabelle
- Ed Jones as Reginald
- Hallie Barthram as Priscilla
- Fatiha El-Ghorri as Anne the driver
- Kath Hughes as Tracy
- Ian Smith as Neville
- Michael Clarke as Pedro

== Episodes ==
=== Season 1 ===
No.	Title	Directed by	Written by	Original release date
1	"A Legend Is Born (Sort Of)"	Ben Palmer	Claire Downes, Ian Jarvis, and Stuart Lane with Noel Fielding	1 March 2024
Dick Turpin rejects the idea of becoming an apprentice butcher under his father and sets out to become a famous highwayman. He soon finds himself the new leader of the Essex Gang and runs afoul of the thief-taker Jonathan Wilde.
2	"The Unrobbable Coach"	Ben Palmer	Richard Naylor with Noel Fielding	1 March 2024
When the Essex Gang attempts to rob the fabled Unrobbable Coach, Honesty gets cursed to become its new driver. Meanwhile, Nell leaves the gang to try and join a more notorious one.
3	"Run Wilde"	Ben Palmer	Richard Naylor and Jon Brittain	8 March 2024
After a successful heist of gold bars in London, Dick finds himself on the run from the Syndicate, England's most notorious criminal organisation, with the help of an unexpected ally: Jonathan Wilde, who is chained to him.
4	"Curse of the Reddlehag"	George Kane	Jon Brittain	15 March 2024
The Essex Gang accidentally frees a powerful witch and enlists Craig's help in an attempt to capture her before she can kill the whole village.
5	"Tommy Silversides"	George Kane	Richard Naylor and Jon Brittain	22 March 2024
A dashing new highwayman arrives and ignites a rivalry with Dick, challenging him to a duel for control over the Essex Gang. Meanwhile, Nell has an unexpected reunion with Lady Gwinear, her mother and leader of the Syndicate.
6	"Turpin Time"	George Kane	Richard Naylor and Jon Brittain	29 March 2024
Imprisoned and sentenced to death, Dick attempts to escape from the Syndicate and reunite with his gang, who are now under the control of Tommy Silversides.

=== Special ===
No.	Title	Directed by	Written by	Original release date
7	"The Night of the Werebear"	Ben Palmer	Jon Brittain and Richard Naylor with Noel Fielding	15 October 2025
After a terrifying monster causes the roads to be closed, the Essex Gang sets out to stop the beast with the help of Moose's former lover, a skilled trapper who specializes in hunting Werebears.

== Production ==
It was announced in April 2022 that Apple TV+ had greenlit a series starring Noel Fielding as the highwayman Dick Turpin. In August 2023, additional casting including Hugh Bonneville, Asim Chaudhry and Tamsin Greig was announced. Episodes one to three are directed by Ben Palmer and episodes four to six are directed by George Kane. Episode one is written by show creators Claire Downes, Ian Jarvis and Stuart Lane with Fielding and episodes two to six are written by Richard Naylor and Jon Brittain with Fielding. Production had commenced at the time the series was announced. It was partly filmed at Ludlow Castle in Shropshire.

In July 2024, the series was renewed for a second season. According to reports, the second season was reportedly 75% completed when Noel Fielding failed to return to set in January 2025. The series was deemed unsalvageable and was then cancelled. According to Fielding's agent, his absence from the set was due to illness. Actors scheduled to appear in the second season included Jason Isaacs, Miranda Richardson, and Dawn French. Fielding has not since revealed the source of the health issue, and it has not interfered with his work on other series.

== Release ==
The series premiered on Apple TV+ on 1 March 2024 and ended on 29 March. A final seventh episode, consisting of material filmed prior to the series' cancellation, was released on October 15, 2025.

== Reception ==
The review aggregator website Rotten Tomatoes reported an 84% approval rating, based on 32 critic reviews. On Metacritic, the series holds a weighted average score of 70 out of 100, based on 14 critics indicating "generally favorable" reviews.
