= Duayne Boachie =

English actor

- Born: London, England
- Education: University of Bedfordshire
- Occupation: Actor
- Years active: 2015-
- Television: Hollyoaks

Duayne Boachie is an English television and film actor from London. Between 2015 and 2019 he played Zack Loveday on Channel 4 series Hollyoaks.

== Early life ==
He grew up in Tottenham and Wood Green in the London Borough of Haringey and attended Risley Avenue Primary School and St Thomas Moore School. He acted in school theatre productions, including playing Bill Sykes in Oliver Twist and Danny Zucko in Grease. He also attended BAP Theatre, based in Bernie Grant Arts Centre. He studied Media Performance for Film, TV and Theatre at the University of Bedfordshire.

== Career ==
=== Hollyoaks ===
In February 2015, Boachie made his debut on long-running Channel 4 soap-opera Hollyoaks playing the character Zack Loveday. For his portrayal of Loveday, Boachie was nominated in the Best Newcomer category at the 2016 British Soap Awards. In August 2017, he was longlisted for Sexiest Male at the Inside Soap Awards. He continued as a regular character on Hollyoaks, until his final episode was broadcast in January 2019.

=== Other work ===
Boachie appeared in the 2016 film 100 Streets, working alongside Idris Elba and Gemma Arterton. In 2019, he appeared in the crime drama Blue Story. In 2021, he played Binks on the BBC One drama You Don’t Know Me alongside Samuel Adewunmi, Sophie Wilde and Bukky Bakray.

In 2024, he could be seen playing Honesty Courage, a key member of Dick Turpin's Essex Gang in Apple TV+ comedy series The Completely Made-Up Adventures of Dick Turpin, alongside Noel Fielding, and a host of guest stars such as Hugh Bonneville, Greg Davies and Tamsin Grieg.

== Personal life ==
In 2016, he was among a group of actors employed by the British Electoral Commission to try and encourage young people to register to vote. A football fan, he has played in celebrity matches to raise money for charity.

== Filmography ==
=== Film ===
Year	Title	Role	Notes	Ref.
2016	Bucky	Shawn	Short film	
2016	100 Streets	Sean		
2019	Blue Story	Sneaks		

=== Television ===
Year	Title	Role	Notes	Ref.
2015–2019	Hollyoaks	Zack Loveday	Series regular; 244 episodes	
2020	The Re-Up	Michael	Miniseries; 1 episode	
2021	You Don't Know Me	Binks	Miniseries; 4 episodes	
2024	Supacell	Braggs	Recurring role; 4 episodes	
2024–2025	The Completely Made-Up Adventures of Dick Turpin	Honesty Barebone	Series regular; 7 episodes	
