= Homewrecker =

Person or thing that ruins relationships

A homewrecker (sometimes styled as home wrecker or home-wrecker) is a person, object or activity that causes or comes close to causing the breakup of a marriage (or similar partnership). The homewrecker is said to have taken one of the spouses away from the marriage, thus "wrecking" the marital home.

Most commonly, the label "homewrecker" is applied to a person having an affair with someone else's spouse or domestic partner; it can also refer to other forces that are destructive to a marital relationship and tied only to one party to that relationship.

== Infidelity ==
When "homewrecker" is used to describe a person, it is applied to someone who breaks up a pre-existing relationship by having an affair with one of its partners. It may be applied more often when the person actually intends to cause the break-up in order to replace the prior partner permanently.

Homewrecking is not used exclusively to describe the break-up of marriages; it is also used in connection with other long-term relationships that resemble marriage, especially where there are children or joint property.

== Non-affair homewreckers ==
Less frequently, other intense and/or time-consuming pursuits of a partner lead to broken relationships and are labeled "homewreckers"; alcoholism, for example, has long been identified as a homewrecker. More common examples are drug addiction, gambling addiction, domestic violence, e.g. child abuse and controlling personality.

Other common targets for homewrecker labeling are intense pursuit of a career, devotion to a hobby, or running a business. The time commitment to these and similar activities can rend normal home life asunder and earn the name "homewrecker".

Immersive Internet-based social applications and pornography are also becoming more commonly labelled as homewreckers, especially when they share the social and sexual aspects of having an affair.

Family members can act as homewreckers by alienating one partner, identifying weaknesses in one partner, and/or exacerbating minor disagreements into major issues.

== Disputed labeling ==
Usage is disputed for precarious relationships prior to the affair. For example, in a faltering marriage, an estranged husband may have an affair, and the wife may blame the alleged homewrecker for the breakup of the marriage, even though the affair itself was partly the result of stresses that pre-dated it. Nevertheless, even in such cases, the affair can be a major impetus in making the relationship unsalvageable.

Others suggest that affairs should never create an impression of homewrecking since it is unhealthy relationships that lead to affairs and that any fault for an affair should be laid more at the feet of the cheating partner than at the third party.

== Other uses ==
=== Cocktails ===
There are several different cocktails called "Homewrecker." As with many named alcoholic drinks, there is an element of hyperbole in this name; it may relate to the common application of term to alcoholism as a marriage stressor, as described above.

The recipes for several different variations of "Homewrecker" cocktails include:

- 2 oz melon liqueur, 2 oz tequila, 2 oz cranberry juice, 1 oz Jägermeister,
- 1/2 oz. Malibu Rum, 1/2 oz. Peach Schnapps, 1/2 oz. Vodka, Orange Juice, Strawberry Daiquiri Mix, or
- 1 1/2 oz Old Overholt Rye, 1/2 oz Punt e Mes, 1/2 oz St. Germain, 1/2 oz Lemon Juice (from 1940)
