= Rachel Leskovac =

English actress, singer (born 1976)

- Born: Rachel Leskovac; 5 June 1976 (age 50); Bradford, West Yorkshire, England
- Education: Liverpool Institute for Performing Arts
- Occupation: Actress
- Years active: 1999–present
- Television: Holby City; Coronation Street; Hollyoaks; Waterloo Road

Rachel Leskovac (born 5 June 1976) is an English actress and singer. She is known for portraying the roles of Kelly Yorke in the BBC One medical drama series Holby City (2003–2004), Natasha Blakeman in the ITV soap opera Coronation Street (2008–2010, 2020–2021), and Joanne Cardsley in the Channel 4 soap opera Hollyoaks (2015–2016). In 2022, she joined the revival of the BBC One school-based drama series Waterloo Road as English teacher Coral Walker. She has been nominated for a Laurence Olivier Award.

== Early life ==
Leskovac was born in Bradford, England. Leskovac has a younger sister, Sophie, and an older sister, Kate. Leskovac attended St Joseph's Catholic College in Bradford and during her youth was a member of local theatre group Scala Kids. She later trained at the Liverpool Institute for Performing Arts, graduating in 1998.

== Acting career ==
Leskovac received critical acclaim for her performance as the young Viv in the musical Spend Spend Spend and was nominated for the Laurence Olivier Award for Best Actress in a Musical at the 2000 Laurence Olivier Awards. She played serial killer nurse Kelly Yorke on Holby City. In 2003, she played Ciara Pickering in the fourth series of At Home with the Braithwaites. In 2006, she also starred in a TV movie called Losing Gemma for Granada TV. In April 2008, Leskovac was signed up to play Natasha Blakeman, a hairdresser on the ITV soap Coronation Street. She left the soap in 2010. In July 2020, it was announced that Leskovac would be reprising her role as Natasha, In 2021, Leskovac left Coronation Street as Natasha died from accidentally getting shot.

Leskovac played Margaret, sister of Betty in the 1950s drama A Passionate Woman alongside Billie Piper in 2010. In 2011, Leskovac starred in an episode of the Sky 1 sitcom Trollied as Leanne the deputy manager who was on maternity leave. In 2012, Leskovac played teacher Lara Heaton in the Channel 4 TV comedy drama series Shameless, and she played Karen, a beauty therapist, in an episode of the Jimmy McGovern drama series Accused. In 2013, she appeared in Last Tango in Halifax before returning to the role in 2020. In 2014, she played Susie Nightingale in the second series of WPC 56. She also appeared in the 2014 crime drama Happy Valley as Julie, the wife of drug dealer-turned-kidnapper Ashley Cowgill. In 2015, she returned to the role of Susie in the third series of WPC 56. In September 2015, she joined the cast of teenage soap opera Hollyoaks as regular Joanne Cardsley. Leskovac received critical acclaim for her role in Hollyoaks. She left the role in December 2016 concluding a dramatic storyline with her.

== Filmography ==
=== Film ===
Year	Title	Role	Notes
2007	Dead Clever	Karen	Television film
2013	Bollywood Carmen	Kylie	Television film
2015	The Mark	Jen	

=== Television ===
Year	Title	Role	Notes
1999	Heartbeat	Record Shop Assistant	Episode: "Puppet on a String"
2000	North Square	Celia Winterburn	Episode: "The Big Cheese"
2001	Peak Practice	Dionne Harrison	Episode: "Together We Stand"
2001	In Deep	Elaine	Episode: "Blue on Blue"
2002	Heartbeat	Pinky Parkinson	Episode: "The Shoot"
2002	Where the Heart Is	Bella Scott	Recurring role; 6 episode
2002	Casualty	Molly Blythe	Episode: "Innocence"
2003	Red Cap	Rita Woolf	Episode: "Crush"
2003	At Home with the Braithwaites	Ciara Pickering	Recurring role; 5 episodes
2003–2004	Holby City	Kelly Yorke	Series regular; 26 episodes
2004	Outlaws	Sheila Mole	Episode: "A Dying Breed"
2005	The Last Detective	Princess	Episode: "Friends Reunited"
2005	Doctors	Jodie Stevens	Episode: "A World of Their Own"
2006	Losing Gemma	Gemma	Miniseries; 2 episodes
2007	The Royal	Marie Beattie	Recurring role; 4 episodes
2008–2010, 2020-2021	Coronation Street	Natasha Blakeman	Series regular; 185 episodes
2010	A Passionate Woman	Margaret	Miniseries; 1 episodes
2011	Trollied	Leanne	Episode: "Series 1, Episode 2"
2012	Shameless	Lara Heaton	Recurring role; 2 episodes
2012	Secrets and Words	Sylvia	Episode: "Help Me If You Can"
2012	Accused	Karen	Episode: "Tracie's Story"
2013	Moving On	Sam	Episode: "Friends Like These"
2013	Law & Order: UK	Amanda Tyler	Episode: "Tracks"
2013–2020	Last Tango in Halifax	Cheryl	Recurring role; 5 episodes
2014	Happy Valley	Julie Mulligan	Recurring role; 3 episodes
2014–2015	WPC 56	Susie Nightingale	Series regular; 10 episodes
2015–2016	Hollyoaks	Joanne Cardsley	Series regular; 69 episodes
2018	Creeped Out	June	Episode: "The Traveller"
2020	All Creatures Great and Small	Southwick	Episode: "All's Fair"
2023–present	Waterloo Road	Coral Walker	Series regular
