= Honour Chen-Williams =

Fictional character from Hollyoaks

- Hollyoaks character
- Portrayed by: Vera Chok
- Duration: 2021–23
- First appearance: 10 December 2021
- Last appearance: 14 April 2023
- Introduced by: Lucy Allan
In-universe information
- Occupation: Counsellor; Lecturer
- Sisters: Mei Lian Chen
- Husband: Dave Chen-Williams (Note: In 2022, it was revealed that Dave and Honour's marriage was invalid due to Dave still being married to another woman when he wed Honour.)
- Sons: Mason Chen-Williams
- Daughters: Serena Chen-Williams
- Adoptive daughters: Lizzie Chen-Williams
- Stepsons: Sam Chen-Williams
- Stepdaughters: Maxine Minniver
- Nieces: Shing Lin Leong

Honour Chen-Williams is a fictional character from the British soap opera Hollyoaks, played by Vera Chok. The character and casting was announced in November 2021 and Honour made her first appearance on 10 December 2021. Honour was introduced as Warren Fox's (Jamie Lomas) prison psychologist and later revealed to be part of a new Hollyoaks family, which included Honour's husband and their children. The family was later expanded by the introduction of Honour's niece, Shing Lin Leong (Izzie Yip). Chok was very grateful to be given the role, feeling that she had hit the bamboo ceiling, and felt proud in being part of the first East Asian family in a soap opera and was happy to represent East Asians on screen, although she felt a bit of pressure. Chok was able to help slightly impact the development of the character and was also able to influence the set of Honour's home by adding a rice cooker and making it a no-shoe house.

Honour's initial storylines included her work with Warren and her relationship with Dave and their family, as well as trying to fit in into the community. A 2022 episode sees Honour and her family celebrate Lunar New Year, with Hollyoaks being the first soap opera to celebrate it. The character was given a short issue-based storyline when Honour and her daughter, Serena Chen-Williams (Emma Lau), experience Sinophobia, which Chok and other cast members praised for highlighting xenophobia and racism related to the COVID-19 pandemic. Honour then gives the other residents free therapy sessions in order to make friend and Chok praising the soap for highlighting mental health issues through this storyline.

Honour's other storylines include finding out that her marriage to Dave is invalid due to Dave still being married to his former wife, conflicts with her family, dealing with her son Mason Chen-Williams' (Frank Kauer) involvement in an incel chatroom, being fired from her job, the breakdown of her relationship with Dave and kissing Tony Hutchinson (Nick Pickard). Honour later made an unannounced exit from the role, with Honour last appearing on 14 April 2023, when she left for a job in London, becoming the second member of the family to leave the soap. Honour and her family were initially well received and longlisted for "Best family" at the 2023 Inside Soap Awards. Honour's Lunar New Year and Sinophobia storylines also received praise. However, by the time of her departure, the character was criticised for being underused, though her departure was considered emotional by critics.

== Creation and casting ==
In November 2021, Hollyoaks released a winter trailer which revealed that Honour, Warren Fox's (Jamie Lomas) prison psychiatrist, would be one of five new characters to move into Hollyoaks, the fictional village of the soap opera. The trailer also revealed that Honour's stepdaughter, Lizzie Chen-Williams (Lily Best), Honour's brother in law Ethan Williams (Matthew James-Bailey) and his girlfriend, Maya Harkwell (Ky Discala), and Honour's daughter Serena Chen-Williams (Emma Lau) would also be moving into the village, although it was not yet revealed that these characters were all part of the same family.

Later that month, it was confirmed that Honour would be played by Vera Chok, who Justin Harp from Digital Spy described as a "veteran actress". Harp revealed that Honour would be "working overtime to get inside Warren's head" and would eventually "succeed" in getting a "shocking confession" from him, although teased that it was unclear whether Honour's "allegiances" would be with Warren or someone else. Chok described joining Hollyoaks as a "dream come true!", commenting "As a Malaysian-Chinese first generation immigrant in the UK, the opportunity to play Honour – a fully rounded person with passions, quirks, and flaws – is an amazing milestone for me and also British TV". Chok explained that she (Note: Chok uses both she/her and they/them pronouns. This article uses she/her pronouns for consistency.) had "hit the ground running" by filming "high drama" with Lomas, who she called an "absolute sweetheart". Chok also revealed that, much to her "delight", there had been "a gallon laughter, love and heart-warming joy" scenes with other cast members, but could not comment further on that. Chok was grateful for the role as she had been "manifesting" playing a comedic character in a long-running series earlier on in 2021, and called Honour her "dream role" that she felt that been written for her. Chok also revealed in an interview in early 2022 that she was enjoying being part of the Lime Pictures "family" due to everyone being so "nice". Honour's first appearance aired on Channel 4 on 10 December 2021. Chok felt that it was "amazing" to be cast in a soap opera after doing a variety of other projects, saying that she felt that she had "hit" the "bamboo ceiling" in her career and was grateful at being able to learn, calling the opportunity "incredible" and saying "I get to learn how TV is made and how to act in this particular style", which she hoped to bring it into her future projects.

"I hope the fans have a whale of a time with caring, chaotic Honour as she starts life again in yet another new place. I love her!"

— Vera Chok on joining Hollyoaks (2021)

Honour was later revealed to be part of the new "blended" Chen-Williams family, which also consisted of Honour's husband Dave (Dominic Power), their son Mason (Frank Kauer), their adoptive daughter Lizzie, Honour's daughter Serena, Dave's son Sam (Matthew McGivern) and Dave's half-brother Ethan, as well as Ethan's girlfriend Maya. Most of the characters had been already introduced in seemingly unconnected storylines. They were described as a "close-knit clan" whose first scenes as a family involved them celebrating Christmas together at The Dog in the Pond. Stephen Patterson from Metro wrote that it was "safe to say" that the family would "make their mark on the eponymous village!" Dominic Knight from ATV Today noted that the family were taking the village "by storm". Before the cast members of the family began filming, they had a "workshop day" where they got to know each other and spoke about what they thought their characters were like and what they wanted, as well as doing some improv with the writers so that they could see how the cast members talk and move together. Chok noted that this does not often happen in the TV industry and revealed that, in addition to having input into the family's development, she was able to ask about her upcoming storylines. Since the cast are given their scripts sent ahead, Chok was able to raise any questions about both cultural and non-cultural related queries.

== Characterisation ==
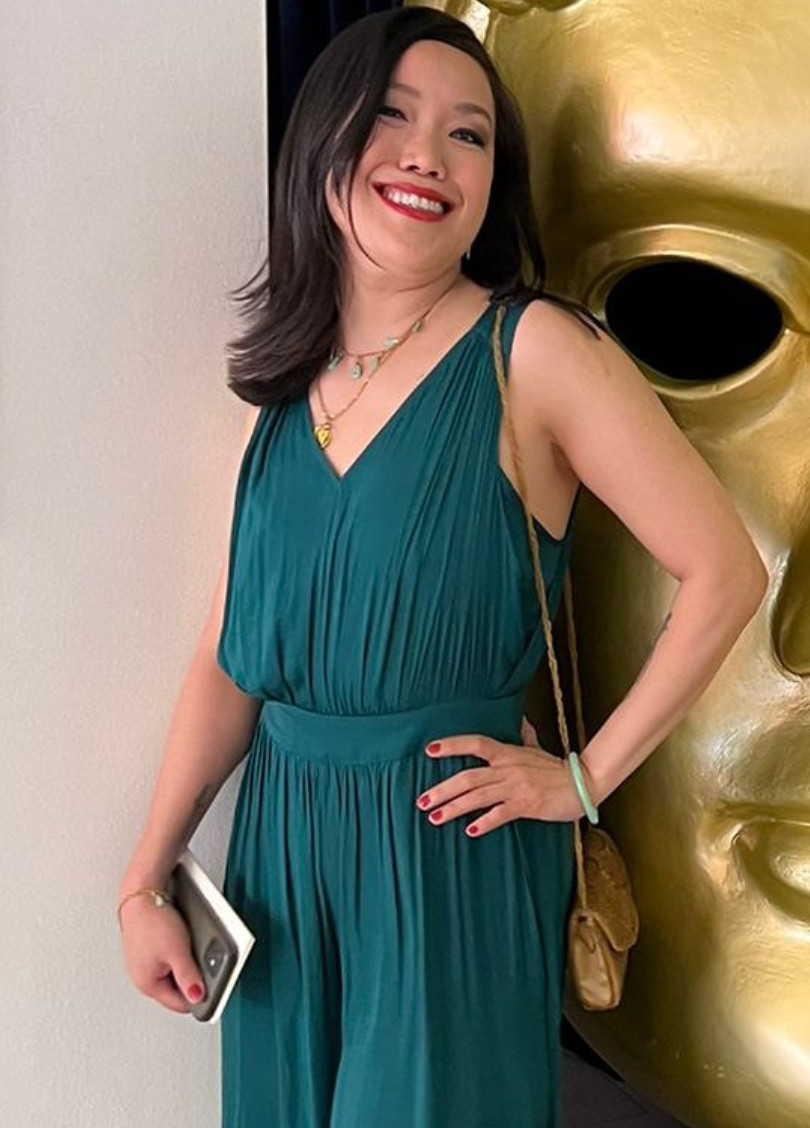
Vera Chok (pictured) liked Honour's characterisation

An official Hollyoaks video highlighting the Chen-Williams family named Honour and Dave as "The fun loving parents". Chok has said that one of her favourite aspects of Honour is when she is funny. Power described Honour "very much the professional woman" whilst calling Dave "very family orientated", with Chok adding that Dave and Honour have a "very solid relationship" due to having a "very large brood", whilst adding that Dave and Honour have "been together for a long while and brought up this really adorable blended family". Chok said that what she "loves" about Honour is that she is not "a stereotypical Chinese professional woman. She has her flaws and she's also a goofball in life. She struggles with real life stuff but she's very good at her job". Chok has said that whilst Honour is a very "caring" person, she needs to look at her "work-life balance". Chok added that Honour is "set on fixing everyone else".

Chok thought it was "such a big deal" to be the first full East Asian family in a soap opera, calling it a "big responsibility" to represent. Chok hoped that other soap operas would introduce East Asian families, especially EastEnders due to the high Chinese population in the East End of London, and added that she thought all forms of media could be "more inclusive" of race, gender, age, religious background and sexuality, asking "We have so many stories out there and why not bring them to the world?" Chok felt "slightly validated as a human being" being on Hollyoaks due to it the importance of seeing East Asians and "people who look like you" on television, and called it "incredible" to now be one of those people. Whilst discussing Honour and her family celebrating Lunar New Year, Chok revealed that more would be revealed about Honour's backstory, "family" and "why she is the way she is". In early 2022, speaking about Honour's upcoming storylines, Chok revealed that Honour would get into more clashes with people, including "comedic run-ins" with some of the established characters, due to coming across as "meddling", but that Honour has good intentions and is just trying to help. Chok added, "I think that's part of being an immigrant or an overthinking therapist. She's like: 'I need to fit in!' So that leads to some comedic episodes."

== Development ==
=== Family and friendships ===
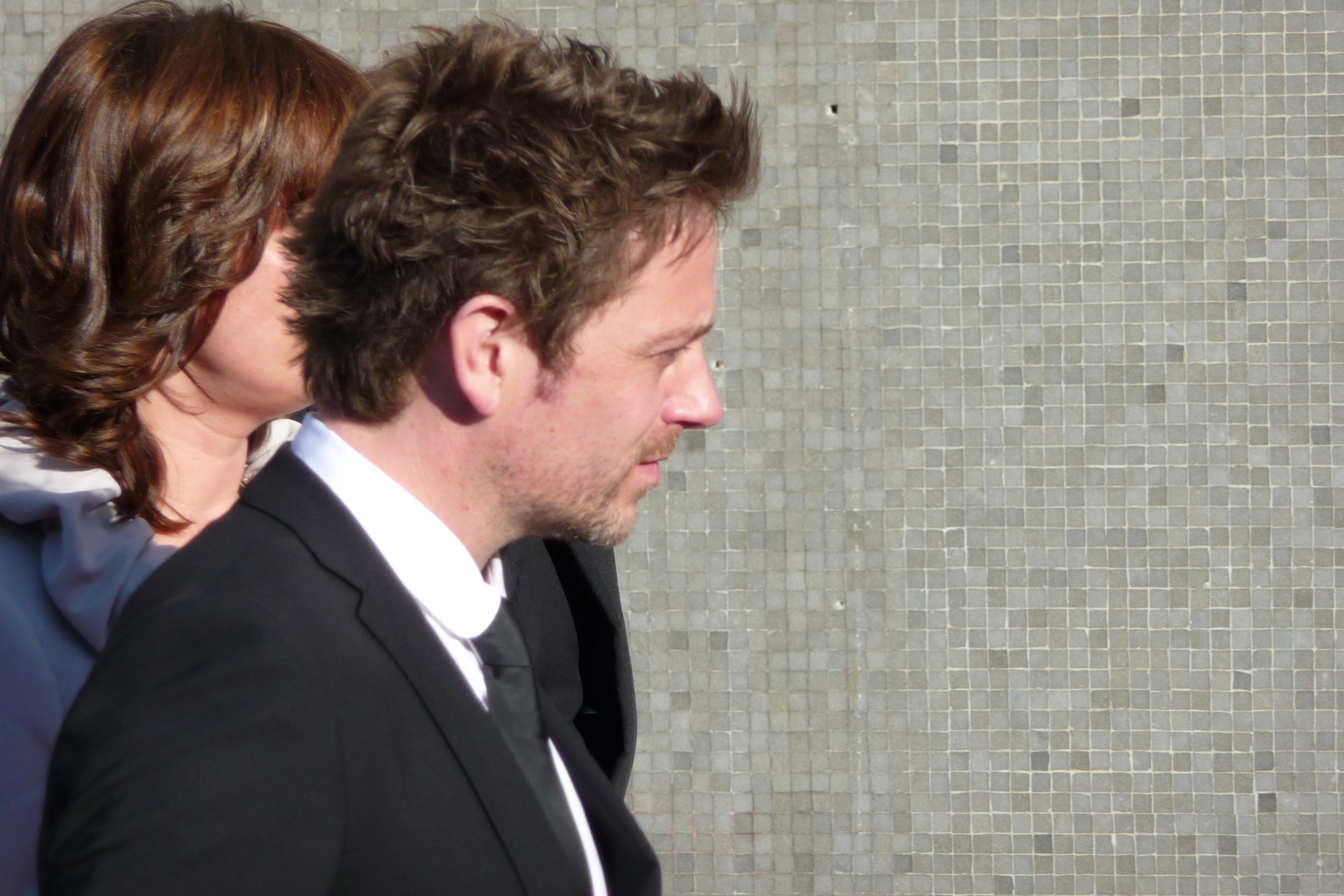
Dominic Power portrays Honour's husband, Dave.

Chok was grateful that the Chen-Williams were a "blended" and modern family, and, despite trying to not read comments online, was happy that the family was well received. Chok felt pressure being part of the first East Asian family, and was very worried about whether the British public would be accepting of the family and whether she was doing a good job in "the eyes of the East Asian community." However, Chok did not feel alone due to there being "multiple East Asian creatives" both on screen and behind the camera, which she called "amazing" and meant that there was always people she could talk to, which was an experience that she was not used to. She added that that was useful for "mental health and wellbeing" and "richer" for storylines due to getting "the detail of people", which breaks down "stereotypes and racism". When Chok was asked by the production team about the set of the home of Chen-Williams family, Chok asked for there to "definitely" be a rice cooker in the home and noted that the home is "definitely a no-shoe house". Chok noted "It's things like that which are so easily missed. Day to day, I get to ask questions about anything that I'm concerned about."

Some fans speculated that Dave could follow a "dark path" due to Power previously portraying serial killer Cameron Murray on another British soap opera, Emmerdale. Chok responded to the fan theories in an interview and said that she did not believe that Dave had an evil nature, calling him an "everyman" who is trying "his best in life". However, she added that there is a darker side due to Dave not thinking that he is good enough, adding that there is "slight tension because Honour has got the posh job and he doesn't." Regarding Honour's relationship with Dave's younger brother, Sam, and how she would react to the news that he is a criminal, Chok said that Honour does "bitch" about him but would ultimately help him as she is "loyal" to her family that he is part of. Chok said that one of her favourite scenes was when she threw Ethan's phone at him, calling it "satisfying". Chok has also said:

"I think [Honour] can be quite mean to Ethan because he's her annoying brother-in-law. But if she really saw that he's struggling in life – which he must be – then she would probably want to help him. Whether or not she would be helpful, I don't know, she might make things worse!"

One of the family's first storylines saw it being revealed that Dave was the long-lost father of another character, Maxine Minniver (Nikki Sanderson). Chok believed that whilst it would affect the way that the children see Dave, it would all "work out" due to the family already being blended, although warned that there would some difficulties along the way. Chok wanted to work more with Sanderson and have Maxine become part of the "geeky" and "wholesome" family, adding that "I think that Nikki plays such a great character. I would love to see how our family include Maxine in all of our cheesy games nights and what she thinks about that." Chok also thought that since Maxine is a "no-nonsense character", she would not let Honour "be bossing her around or anything like that", with Chok believing that Maxine would "set Honour straight". Speaking about the love triangle between Serena, Lizzie and Sid Sumner (Billy Price), Chok called it a "surprise" to Honour, saying, "It's the worst nightmare, isn't it? Your two daughters, who are the exact same age, have fallen for the same guy. How do you navigate that? One is your blood daughter and one is your adopted daughter and they're so different." Chok also said that Honour does "struggle" in giving "sensible boy advice". Later in 2022, Honour and Serena are later "at odds" and are not "seeing eye to eye", with Chok explaining that it's "the usual situation of the parent motivated to act in the best interests of their child, but the child not necessarily seeing things the same way". The two characters then have a "lovely" scene together where they reconnect, with Chok explaining that "Honour realises she's a bit of a workaholic and needs to manage her family life too. They reach an understanding". Chok has said that she "adores" Lau, who portrays Serena. Chok noted that there was some underlying tension in the family, in addition to questions, such as who the children's other biological parents are and Honour and Dave's attitude towards them, as well as how the family members all feel about each other due to being different races; Chok promised that it all "comes to the surface". In November 2022, it was announced that Honour's family would be expanded by the introduction of her niece, Shing Lin Leong, played by Izzie Yip, in December 2022. Chok said that she "adores" Yip.

Regarding Honour's friendships, Chok revealed that whilst Honour is spending a lot of time with Diane, she thinks it would be fun to hang out with someone "unlikely", such as James Nightingale (Gregory Finnegan), as they would "argue" or be "super-bitchy together". She also added that whilst Diane and Tony would be a "sensible" choice for Honour, it would not be exciting, adding that the character prefers "fiesty" people like Nancy Hayton (Jessica Fox), who Honour is "frenemies" with. Chok also thought that Honour would be "best mates" with Donna-Marie Quinn (Lucy-Jo Hudson), saying that despite the two not having shared scenes yet, she thought Honour being "weirdly patronising" could lead to them "suddenly" becoming "best friends!" Hughes from Inside Soap noted that viewers have seen Honour "auditioning" for friends.

=== Warren Fox ===
Honour's initial storyline is beginning her job as Warren's prison psychiatrist, who has been imprisoned for the murder of Timmy Simons (Sam Tutty), which he did not commit. In one of their sessions, Warren makes an "accidental confession" when he loses his patience and goes on a rant about his criminal past, where he "inadvertently" mentions that he ran someone else over and killed them, which is causing him guilt. Honour, realising this is a "major secret", asks for more details, and later reveals to Warren that he is due to be released from prison depending on the report that she gives on the authorities. Honour is found to be an "ally" of Warren as she "reluctantly" agrees to keep Warren's confession a secret when he pleads with her that it was a misunderstanding. Daniel Kilkelly from Digital Spy questioned whether this could be a decision that Honour later regrets, whilst Kilkelly's colleague, Susannah Alexander, wrote that Honour "chose to put everything on the line" by ignoring what Warren had said. The storyline is revisited when Warren tries to help Maxine, who is feeling rejected by Dave. Warren's confession, which was recorded due to Honour recording all of sessions with her patients, later falls into the "wrong hands", putting Warren in "real danger". Chok revealed that the scene where she got to "shout" at Warren was one of her favourite scenes due to Warren being built up as a "tough guy" and Warren being bigger than Honour, calling it "fun".

=== Sinophobia and Lunar New Year ===
In November 2021, Chok told Digital Spy that she had filmed a "gawp-worthy confrontation" scene with Katie McGlynn and Stephanie Waring, who portray Becky Quentin and Cindy Cunningham, respectively. This was later revealed to be part of a "difficult Sinophobia storyline", where Becky makes some derogatory comments about China and the COVID-19 pandemic to Serena, which leads to Honour getting involved when she confronts Becky about it. Becky "cruelly" berates Serena for ordering a package from China and uses conspiracy theories regarding the pandemic to justify her "racial outburst", which upsets Serena and shocks Cindy, who calls Becky a "bigot". Cindy later confronts Becky with Honour, who calls Becky out on her hurtful comments and tells her how damaging they are, and threatens to report this as a hate crime if Becky hurts her family again. Honour gives Becky "a piece of her mind" and notes that whilst she wants to think that there is some "hope" for Becky, she will not tolerate her hurting her family anymore. Chok wrote on social media that she was "grateful" that Hollyoaks was bringing Sinophobia "to light", and added:

"The pandemic was and remains a difficult time for anyone who looks vaguely Chinese. The history of under-reporting or ignoring racism towards people of East Asian descent is very sad. Please support inclusion and anti-racism. Thank you so much."

"It was so heartening that Lime and Hollyoaks let this happen. We're a new family and immediately we're like: 'Let's celebrate something that's a big part of their culture'.
"They also made sure that the story was detailed. It's not just like: 'This is what all Chinese people do'. Instead it's: 'This is what these people are like. They're a blended family, how do they feel about their culture and heritage?'"

— Chok on the Lunar New Year celebrations (2022)

Lau, Serena's portrayer, also called it a "really important issue" that the soap was "tackling and representing", adding that she had friends who had experienced Sinophobia, which was "rampant" during the pandemic. McGlynn wrote on social media how it was an important storyline to highlight due to the "huge rise of Sinophobia" and how it was important to call it out as racism, and noted how playing Becky made her uncomfortable due to Becky having views that the actress does not share at all, although noted that people like that "unfortunately" exist in real life, as well as urging any viewers affected to seek support via the Channel 4 website.

Honour and her family are seen celebrating Lunar New Year in a special episode broadcast in early 2022, with Hollyoaks becoming the first British soap opera to celebrate it. Chok was very "grateful" that Hollyoaks included the celebrations, saying "Lunar New Year is like Christmas and New Year wrapped up in one for Chinese and other Asian people. People come together and think about their family, whether they're close or far away." Chok was also grateful that the celebrations were "detailed" and showed the differences between the feelings of Honour and her children towards their culture due to Honour being an immigrant and her children being born in Britain. Chok was also grateful that the production included an East Asian writer, cultural advisor and director in addition to actors, especially due to East Asians generally being very "invisible" in British Media.

=== Mental health ===
In May 2022, Honour offers free therapy consultations to the residents of Hollyoaks. The storyline was part of the soap's ongoing commitment to raising awareness about mental health. Chok said that Honour is offering her "skills" to those who "need a helping hand" as she is trying to make friends and embed herself in the community. Honour's "kind gesture" allows the residents to face "tricky truths" but also "highlights some deep-rooted issuss" in Honour's own home that she has been avoiding. Chok also said that Honour's idea is "not about selling her services and forcing people to spend hundreds of pounds on therapy – she wants to empower and make it clear there is support available if you're struggling", although noted that this was a form of "procrastination" as Honour is not facing "her own demons". Honour gives advice to Cindy, Diane Hutchinson (Alex Fletcher), Liberty Savage (Jessamy Stoddart) and Darren Osborne (Ashley Taylor Dawson), who have all had mental illness struggles. Chok praised the soap highlighting mental health, explaining that she likes "TV to entertain, but also have social impact to make people feel less isolated, especially in terms of identity issues, whether that's race, gender or being queer". Johnathon Hughes from Inside Soap called it an "unusual" way of getting to know Honour's neighbours.

=== Family secrets and incel storyline ===
When interviewed by the Daily Mirror, Chok teased that there would be an upcoming twist for the Chen-Williams family, saying that the past would catch up with the family and that people "have been lying" to each other, and added, "watch out for the quiet ones in [Honour's] family. Still waters run deep and all that." She said that it would cause "chaos" and "collateral damage" and would "challenge the whole happy family thing". Chok also teased the upcoming Autumn stunt and hinted that there would be at least one character death, but denied that it would be Honour, saying "I just got here, you can't kill me off it's too soon. If I die I want it to be really over the top, a proper controversial death." Chok told Inside Soap that the family had so far been very "happy" and "Disney"-like, but that the stunt week would "set off" many reveals, adding that there is a lot to be explored. She revealed that Honour is keeping an eye on Lizzie and Serena but assumes that Mason is "fine", and that Honour does not know much about the secrets in the family.

In December 2022, Honour is "rendered speechless" when Dave reveals to her the "huge bombshell" that they are not legally married, as he was still married to his former wife, Flora, when he and Honour married. This comes shortly after the arrival of Honour's sister, Mei Lian Chen (Stacy Liu), where Honour pretends that Dave has another job and tells Mei Lian that Dave has let her down many times, which he overhears, leading to Honour to "track him down" in order to fix the "mess" she has made with her "cruel words". Honour had also been "determined" to find out why Flora had taken a restraining order against Dave before her death, which he revealed was because Flora was "controlling" and did not let him divorce her. Things had been getting "increasingly tense" for the couple due to Honour knowing about the restraining order and Dave confronting Honour over her "ridiculous behaviour" over her sister's arrival, such as renting a car and not wanting to introduce Maxine to Mei Lan.

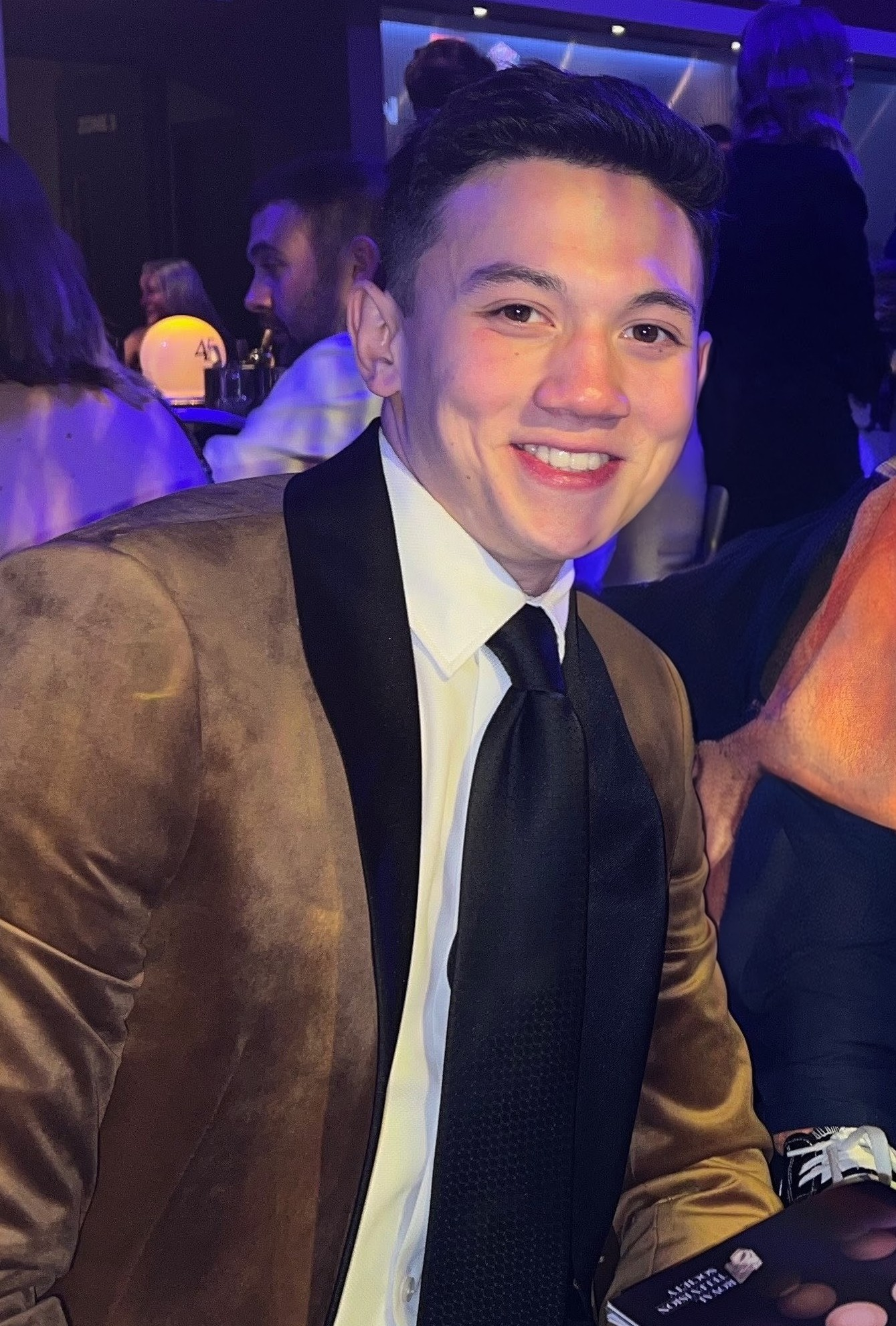
Frank Kauer (pictured) played Honour's son Mason

When Honour finds out that Mason has been harassing DeMarcus Westwood (Tomi Ade), she sets to figure out what is going on with Mason, whilst Dave tries to "ignore the whole problem". Honour and Dave are then "rocked" by the discovery that Eric Foster (Angus Castle-Doughty) has drawn their youngest child, Mason, into radicalised misogyny, leading to Mason joining incel online chatrooms and spreading hatred online and in person. Chok said that it is the family's biggest challenge and it tears them apart, with Dave and Honour having no answers, and that she enjoyed being part of the storyline as she found it "clever" that it explored the attitudes of men towards the treatment of women in society, as it showed that more men, such as Tony and Dave, need educating.

Chok told Inside Soap how it is horrifying for Honour to see what her "baby boy" has been posting on the forums and that she wants to "rescue" her son both from what he has been exposed to online and also from the police. Chok explained that "Mason doesn't realise how dangerous Eric is and what he is capable of, he doesn't see there could be consequences from all this online hatred. [Honour] asks herself: 'Is Mason going to be dragged down because of all this? Is his life going to be ruined? Could he get arrested because of his association with Eric?' Chok noted that whilst Honour cannot understand why Mason has gone down this route, she does not blame him because "as a psychologist" she knows that "people get swept along with things". Before Honour found out about Mason's involvement, Chok speculated that it would be "horrific" when Honour finds out and that she would blame herself or Dave, and that it would be "humiliating" for her professionally as "it's her job to spot these things". Chok explained that Honour "fears" that this is entirely her fault as she had suspected "for months" that something was up with Mason, but had been in a "difficult position" as she did not want to be "too heavy-handed with her parenting" and also wanted to respect Dave, who had not taken it seriously. When Mason had told Honour that he felt lonely and uncool in comparison to his school peers, Chok felt that Honour did not really listen due to it being too painful for her to hear, and that when Honour suspected something was up, she suggested family time and therapy, but that did not happen as "life got in the way".

Honour and Dave's reluctance to go to the police about Mason's behaviour angers Lizzie and Serena, with the sisters rejecting Honour's suggestion of trying to work things out. Honour defends Mason and says that his downfall is all due to Eric, and she goes to support him when Mason is summoned to the police station for questioning, which angers Serena. Chok noted that Honour cannot ignore that she has "two daughters living with a potentially dangerous misogynist". Chok believed that audience would be "shouting at the screen" for Dave and Honour to stop being so stupid and to listen to their children. Serena eventually accepts that her parents will not stop giving Mason support, but decides to secretly leave the house, which was used for Serena's departure after Lau left the soap in late 2022, with Serena being the first member of the Chen-Williams family to leave. When Honour finds out that someone in Mason's school has launched a petition to get Mason kicked out of Hollyoaks High, which leads to Honour "ambushing" Eric by visiting him in prison, hoping that he can "give her the insight she needs" to help Mason. Eric is not pleased to see her but Honour makes it clear that she is only to "get the answers she needs" to help Mason due to being "out of options" in her "quest" to help Mason. Eric causes trouble by telling Honour that she is the cause of her family's issues, causing her to risk losing "everything" when she lashes out and slaps Eric. Honour then loses her job at the prison.

=== Further marital problems ===
"It would be tragic if Dave and Honour split, but it wouldn't mean they aren't still a family. It's a really good question though – should parents split up if they're not happy? What's better for the children? Honour doesn't know what to do…"

— Chok on Dave and Honour possibly splitting up (2023)

In September 2022, viewers on Twitter started speculating that there "something going on" between Dave and Diane, though the theory did not materialise into a storyline. Chok "added fuel" to the fan theory when she posted a picture on Instagram of Dave and Honour waving flags supporting Tony Hutchinson's (Nick Pickard), Diane's husband and Eric's half-brother, council election bid, where she wrote that she had enjoyed filming the scenes but also asked "is Dave getting too cosy with Diane?? Eeeeeeek!"

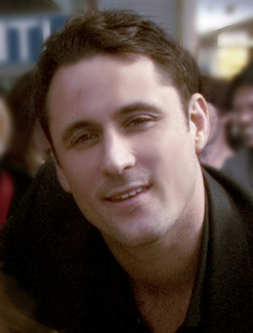
Honour kisses Tony Hutchinson, played by Nick Pickard.

In February 2023, Chok teased a possible split for Honour and Dave, saying, "When you introduce a happy family on Hollyoaks, you know it won't last", and noted how Dave had not been "supportive" with Honour losing her job, Serena moving away and the issues with Mason. Mason's behaviour had also caused tension between her and Dave. Dave proposes to Honour, which Chok said puts "Honour in a tough spot as she cares about him and loves Dave, but the problems remain", and noted that "Dave proposed because he saw someone else do it – it wasn't even an original idea". Dave and Honour then have a "big" argument when Dave overhears Honour revealing her doubts to Grace Black (Tamara Wall), which leads to Honour telling Dave her true feelings about getting married, leaving the relationship "hanging in the balance". Chok noted that Honour would not have brought this up if Dave had not heard her conversation with Grace, and that Honour does not want to hurt Dave but does have some "suppressed emotions".

In April 2023, things take an "unexpected turn" when Honour shares a "shock kiss" with Tony. Honour has previously confided in Tony, who is also going through a difficult time, that Dave's lies have made her question if she still loves him. Tess Lamacraft from What To Watch wrote that Honour's marriage is "clearly under huge strain" and that Honour is trying to be a "shoulder to cry on", but suggested that Honour was getting too friendly with Tony. Whilst attempting to try to fix between Honour and Dave during a double date night, Tony accidentally reveals one of Honour's secrets by suggesting that she and Dave can "fall in love again", which results in Dave calling Honour a "hard faced cow". Tony and Diane try to help the couple again but fail, so Tony goes to Honour's house, where he finds her drinking and saying that she never loved Dave. After Tony suggests ending things with Dave if he does not appreciate her and then starts talking about his own marital problems, Honours misreads the signs and kisses him, though he pulls away.

=== Departure ===
In the episode that originally aired on 14 April 2023 on Channel 4, Honour made an unannounced exit, becoming the second member of the Chen-Williams family to leave the soap. In the storyline, Honour, who is struggling to forgive Dave for his lies, finds out that her application for a lecturer job in London has been successful, and she decides to take the position for a fresh start. She hopes to take Mason and Shing Lin with her, but they refuse, leading her to reconsider her decision, although they persuade her to go ahead, and Honour shares her goodbyes with the family. Following her exit, Chok confirmed that it was official and uploaded a video on Twitter where she thanked fans for supporting Honour and being "so kind", adding "It's been so great. I mean all the love and I've met such incredible people." She also said that she had "great" experiences and had learnt a lot about herself and the show business. Chok and Hollyoaks also posted another video in which she described her favourite scenes as Honour, which included where Honour got to throw and smash things, and when Honour is surprised by Mercedes McQueen (Jennifer Metcalfe), who she had just been talking about, (Note: Honour had previously tried to help Mercedes and her son in early 2022.) which Chok found humorous. Following Honour's departure, Dave spirals "out of control" and begins to pester Honour via "disturbing" text messages, telling her that she walked out on the family, which leads Honour to ask him to leave her alone, which Dave responds to by texting her that he wishes that they had never met.

== Storylines ==
Honour starts her job as a psychologist at Longmere Prison and is assigned to speak to Warren Fox (Jamie Lomas), who has been arrested for the murder of Timmy Simons (Sam Tutty). Warren admits to her that he did not kill Timmy, but did kill his best friend. Honour figures out that this was Brody Hudson (Adam Woodward), and things are complicated when the transcript between her and Warren is stolen from her house. When celebrating Christmas with her family at The Dog in the Pond, Honour reassures Serena, who is feeling guilty that the family moved to Hollyoaks because of her competition, that moving was a group decision and that she is enjoying her new job at the prison. Honour is surprised when she finds out that Dave's long lost daughter, Maxine Minniver (Nikki Sanderson), lives in Hollyoaks, and learns that Dave blackmailed Warren, Maxine's boyfriend, over his secret to stop him from telling Honour and their children. Honour encourages Dave to get to know Maxine, but Honour's relationship with Serena is strained when she learns that Honour already knew about Dave's secret daughter. Honour encourages her children to see things from Dave's point of view. Honour celebrates Lunar New Year with her family, telling Diane Hutchinson (Alex Fletcher) that she started celebrating it when Mason was born so that he could be celebrate it as Serena had celebrated it with her father. Honour struggles making friends in the village, but she eventually becomes friends with Cindy Cunningham (Stephanie Waring), who had supported Honour and Serena when they faced racist comments from Becky Quentin (Katie McGlynn). Mercedes McQueen (Jennifer Metcalfe) seeks out Honour's help with her son, Bobby Costello (Jayden Fox), who has been behaving strangely. Honour tries to share her concerns with Mercedes but she does not take it well, telling Honour to stay out of her business. Honour later witnesses Mercedes lashing out at Bobby and considers reporting her concerns to social services.

A strain is put on Honour and Dave's marriage when it is revealed that Dave's deceased wife, Flora, had received a restraining order against him years ago. With Mason going through an "identity crisis", Honour calls her sister Mei Lian Chen (Stacy Liu) and brother in law Meng Chye Leong (Nicholas Goh) to help him, and they arrive in Hollyoaks with their daughter, Shing Lin Leong (Izzie Yip). During the visit, Honour asks Dave to keep Maxine away from her sister's family and gets Dave to lie about his occupation. Dave overhears Honour telling Mei Lian that Dave has let her down many times, which upsets him. Honour goes to find him to fix things, where he reveals that Flora had refused to grant him a divorce, meaning that he was still married to Flora when he wed Honour, making their marriage invalid. Honour is devastated that her marriage is not legal. Shing Lin moves in with Honour and her family when it is revealed that her parents can no longer afford to send her to private school due to having lost their savings in a scam. Honour and Dave find out that Mason has been indoctrinated into a misgognistic chatroom by Eric Foster (Angus Castle-Doughty), who has harmed several of Mason's sisters, and that Mason has shared inappropriate pictures of his classmates on there. Honour and Dave's reluctance to tell Sam or the police about Mason's behaviour causes a rift between them and Serena and Lizzie, which leads to Serena leaving Hollyoaks. Not knowing what to do, Honour visits Eric in prison, hoping to get answers to help her son. However, Eric taunts her and tells her that Honour is the cause of the issues, leading to her to slap him. Honour is subsequently fired from Longmere Prison.

Dave asks Honour to remarry him and despite initially saying yes, she changes her mind. Their marital problems worsen, so Diane and her husband, Tony Hutchinson (Nick Pickard) attempt to help them reconcile. Honour admits to Tony that she does not think that her relationship with Dave will work out and tries to kiss him. She then finds out that her job application as a lecturer of Psychology in a London University has been successful. Dave finds out about the kiss and Honour tells him that she is leaving him for London, before telling her family. Honour assures Mason that she is not leaving because of him. She believes that Shing Lin and Mason will come with her, but they decide to stay with Dave. Honour apologies to Tony and Diane, telling them that she has been unhappy for a while and needs some space from Dave, before saying a final goodbye to her family and leaving Hollyoaks. Dave spirals following Honour's departure and harasses her via text. When she asks him to leave her alone, he says that he wishes he had never laid eyes on her. Later that year, Honour's stepsons, Sam Chen-Williams (Matthew McGivern), stays with her in London when he temporarily leaves the village.

== Reception ==
The Chen-Williams were initially popular with viewers. The family was longlisted for "Best Family" in the 2022 Inside Soap Awards, but they did not make shortlist. The official website of 2:22 A Ghost Story noted how Honour was the "head of the first ever East Asian family in a UK continuing drama".

Stephen Patterson from Metro thought that Honour's exit scenes were emotional, writing "No, you're crying", and noted how Honour walked through "the famous archway". Daniel Kilkelly from Digital Spy also called Honour's departure scenes "emotional" and praised the Sinophobia scenes, describing them as "powerful" for Honour and Serena, as well as praising the "more diverse storytelling" such as the celebration of Lunar New Year. He also praised the "electrifying scenes" where Honour and the rest of her family deal with the revelation of Mason's behaviour in the radical misogyny storyline, writing that the family "came to life" and that the actors "clearly relished the opportunity they'd been given" and helped give the storyline the "strong aftermath that it deserved". However, following Honour's departure, Kilkelly wrote that Hollyoaks had "failed" the Chen-Williams family due to problems with the writing. He cited Honour's link to Warren as his prison psychologist was one of the reasons that the Chen-Williams family initially had storyline potential, but that afterwards the show's "commitment" to the family started to "wane", writing that "Honour's link to Warren was abandoned early in her time on the show. While she was often then shown playing a supporting role in other people's storylines, she has now left the village feeling largely unexplored as a character in her own right." He also cited the storyline where Honour discovered Dave's bigamy as an unsuccessful revelation due to the plot being "difficult to follow" due to the gaps in broadcasting the storyline, which Kilkelly called "frustrating" and a "major problem which haunts Hollyoaks in general at the moment" and wrote that it risked the audience forgetting what had happened when the storylines resumed on screens. Kilkelly concluded by saying that the family has "talented" portrayers and that it was not their fault that the "storytelling" had problems. Kilkelly's colleague, Stephanie Chase, wrote that the family had "suffered" two cast exits.
