= Dave Chen-Williams =

Fictional character from Hollyoaks

- Hollyoaks character
- Portrayed by: Dominic Power
- Duration: 2021–2024
- First appearance: Episode 5733; 1 December 2021
- Last appearance: Episode 6460; 11 September 2024
- Introduced by: Lucy Allan
In-universe information
- Other names: Dave Williams; Blue
- Occupation: Landlord; Postman; Handyman
- Half-brothers: Ethan Williams
- Wife: Flora Williams (backstory); Honour Chen-Williams (until 2023; void); Cindy Cunningham (2024)
- Sons: Sam Chen-Williams; Mason Chen-Williams
- Daughters: Maxine Minniver
- Adoptive daughters: Serena Chen-Williams; Lizzie Chen-Williams
- Granddaughters: Minnie Minniver

Dave Williams (also Chen-Williams) is a fictional character from British soap opera Hollyoaks, played by Dominic Power. The character and casting was announced on 23 November 2021 and Dave made his first appearance on 1 December 2021. He was introduced by executive producer, Lucy Allan as part of a new Hollyoaks family which consisted of Dave, his wife Honour (Vera Chok), half-brother Ethan Williams (Matthew James-Bailey) and his girlfriend Maya Harkwell (Ky Discala) and their children Serena (Emma Lau), Lizzie (Lily Best), Sam (Matthew McGivern) and Mason (Frank Kauer). Upon arrival, it was revealed that Dave is the biological father of Maxine Minniver (Nikki Sanderson). Dave's family expanded a year later when Honour's niece Shing Lin Leong (Izzie Yip) was introduced in December 2022.

Dave's storylines have involved reuniting with Maxine after being pushed away by her mother Trish Minniver (Denise Welch), his son Mason being involved in an incel chatroom, being revealed as a bigamist and thus making his marriage to Honour invalid, his relationship and later marriage to Cindy Cunningham (Stephanie Waring), and the death of his daughter Lizzie and subsequent rivalry with Warren Fox (Jamie Lomas), who was responsible for her death and murdering Warren's mother, Norma Crow (Glynis Barber) in cold blood. In 2024, it was revealed that Dave was previously a gangster who used the alias, Blue. Dave was killed off on 11 September 2024 after he was left to die by Warren, and was subsequently shot by Robbie Roscoe (Charlie Wernham).

== Casting and characterisation ==
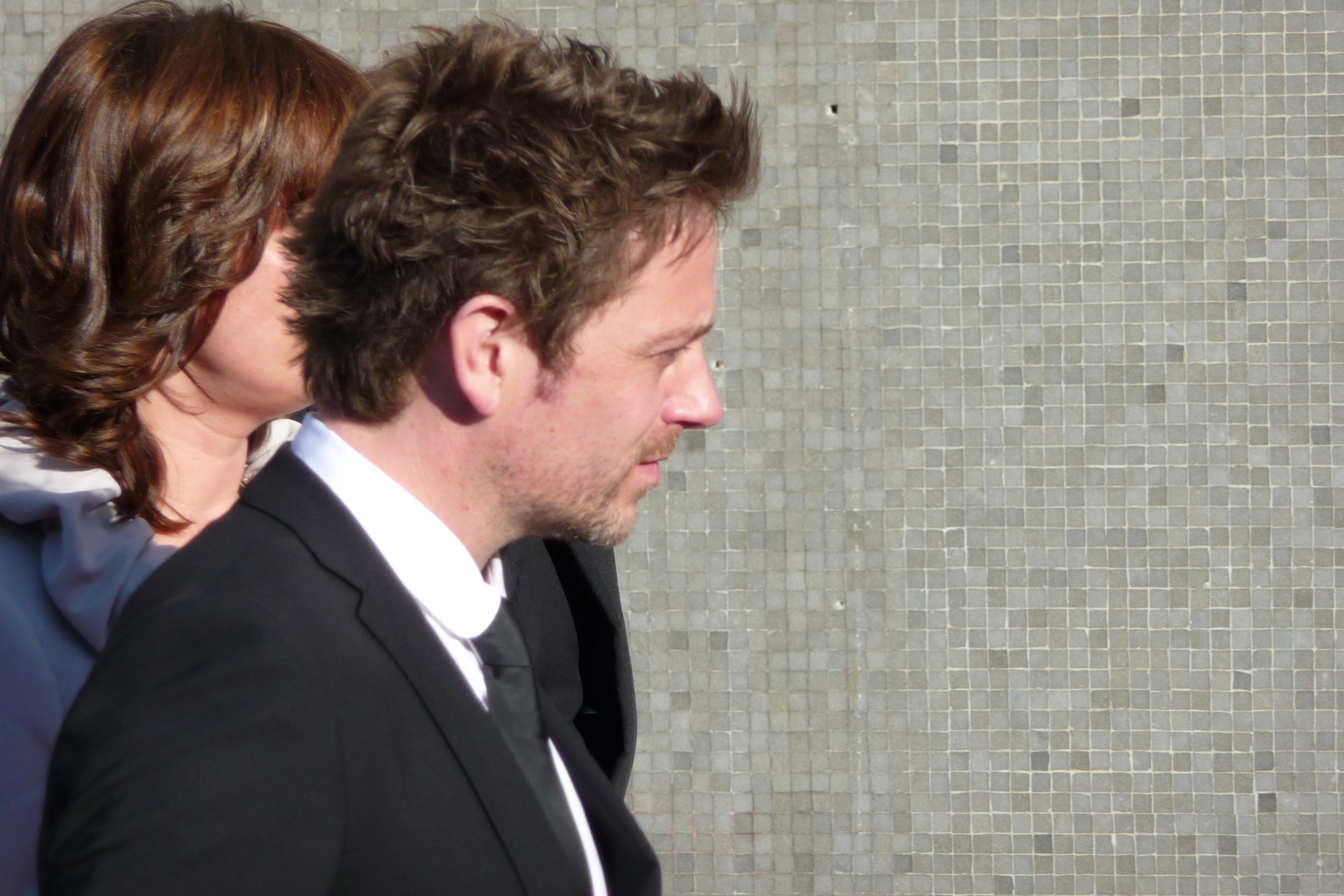
Dominic Power portrays Dave.

Power's casting was announced on 23 November 2021. He had previously played PC Leon Taylor in long running serial The Bill between 2008 and 2010, and Cameron Murray in soap opera Emmerdale between 2011 and 2013, both on ITV1, the latter of which Justin Harp from Digital Spy described him to be "best known for". Power also had a couple of roles in BBC soap opera EastEnders, which he reflected on in March 2023. He shared his experiences with Inside Soap: "I've been in EastEnders twice! One of my first-ever jobs was playing a motorbike courier giving a parcel to Grant Mitchell (Ross Kemp). It was the hottest day of the year, and the one line that I had, I messed up! I remember Ross [Kemp] saying to me, 'It's not as easy as it looks, is it?'" He continued: "A few years later, I had a very small part where I had to square up to Phil (Steve McFadden). I almost didn't want to do it because I felt quite scared of him!" Power has also had roles on BBC medical soaps Casualty and Doctors.

Upon casting, Power teased: "It's an honour to be part of such an iconic British soap. Can't wait for the Hollyoaks fans to meet Dave." Harp described Dave to be harbouring "dark secrets." He explained: "Dave appears outwardly friendly and kind, yet the residents of Hollyoaks will eventually find out that there is much more to this newcomer that meets the eye. The village residents' new neighbour is carrying some dark secrets that could prove to be life-changing for himself and others in Hollyoaks when they are revealed." An official Hollyoaks video highlighting the Chen-Williams family named Honour and Dave as "fun loving parents". Dave is later revealed to be a member of the Chen-Williams, a new family on Hollyoaks and the first East Asian family on a soap opera.

== Development ==
=== Introduction ===
Dave arrived in Hollyoaks village in November 2021, following his stepdaughter Serena (Emma Lau) who arrived two months earlier and younger half-brother, Ethan (Matthew James-Bailey) who arrived earlier that month. His arrival was followed by the rest of their family unit including his wife Honour (Vera Chok), his son from his first marriage, Sam (Matthew McGivern), adopted daughter from his first marriage, Lizzie (Lily Best) and his and Honour's son, Mason (Frank Kauer). Justin Harp from Digital Spy initially described to be "outwardly friendly and kind, yet the residents of Hollyoaks will eventually find out that there is much more to this newcomer that meets the eye." After purchasing 3 Oakdale Drive, Flat 4 from Tony Hutchinson (Nick Pickard), the family moved in, which caused trouble for tenants the McQueen family who as a result faced homelessness as a result of the eviction. From the beginning, Dominic Power, who plays Dave had pondered about whether or not his character had a "villainous streak". Referring back to his previous regular soap role, Cameron Murray from Emmerdale, who was a serial killer, Power spoke in an interview with Inside Soap: "It's interesting because in my first few Emmerdale interviews I commented on how nice Cameron was! I explained that he was a family man, and that he was misunderstood – strangely a bit like what I'm saying now with Dave! I'm preparing myself for the fact that anything can happen..." Dave's half-brother Ethan was involved with criminal activities, which Power described Dave to be "oblivous" to.

=== Serena's accident and surgery ===
As the family begin to settle into the village, Dave and Honour try to befriend many other couples in the village. They were thrilled to find out that Serena was chosen to represent England in the 2022 Commonwealth Games. However, she had to drop out after she fell off the roof of the Park Cafe and had surgery performed by unqualified doctor Ali Shahzad (Raji James), who was subsequently fired. After learning of Maxine's involvement in Serena's accident, Dave advised her to give their family some space, which he regrets and makes up with her a few weeks later. Justin Harp from Digital Spy suggested Dave's continuous involvement with Maxine would put a strain on his relationship with Serena. He said: "Serena is on a high after getting the big news, yet any good feelings don't last for long when she finds out her dad Dave was giving Maxine Minniver money that was supposed to go to her." Harp described how it would also affect Dave's family as a whole: "The Chen-Williams family will grapple with a potential recovery for Serena while trying not to blame Maxine for their doomed night out."

=== Marital problems and breakdown ===
Dave and Honour's marriage hit the rocks after Sam (Matthew McGivern), who was a police officer discovered that his mother and Dave's ex-wife, Flora had a restraining order issued against him twenty years earlier. Honour, who had also found this information out, kept it from Dave for weeks and confided in Sam. Daniel Kilkelly described the situation: "Honour recently doubted everything she knew about Dave when she discovered that his late ex-wife Flora once took out a restraining order against him." The situation reached a boiling point when Honour invited her sister Mei Lian Chen (Stacy Liu) and her husband Meng Chye Leong (Nicholas Goh) over from Malaysia. Honour is keen to impress Mei Lian and causes Dave annoyance by not inviting Maxine Minniver (Nikki Sanderson) as she saw her as his illegitimate daughter. Honour even goes to the extent of renting an expensive car, which Dave confronts her about for trying too hard, which is when she reveals she knows about the restraining order before her sister and brother-in-law arrive. Dave and Honour play happy families for show, and she even lies about his profession to make them seem more successful, which Mei Lian sees through and confronts Honour about, causing her to reveal that Dave is the biggest liar of all.

In 2023, Dave and Honour's relationship broke down after a series of struggles. In January, they discovered Mason's assossiations with extreme misogynist, Eric Foster (Angus Castle-Doughty), the half-brother of Tony, when Mason awoke in hospital after being attacked and discovered that Eric was holding the attendees of Verity Hutchinson's (Eva O'Hara) funeral at the pub. After Honour discovered many hateful messages and an inappropriate photo of Leah Barnes (Ela-May Demircan) on his phone, Serena handed Mason's computer into the police after she and Lizzie were two of the hostages. Dave had advised Serena against handing the computer in, but after doing so, she left for Shanghai as she wasn't ready to forgive Mason. Honour subsequently got fired from Longmere Prison where she worked as a psychologist after punching Eric. Dave proposed to Honour after these events, but she declined after having doubts after all of Dave's lies and secrets. Dave then revealed that he and Flora never divorced before he married her in 2006, therefore making their marriage bigamous. Honour left Dave, struggling to forgive him and left him which he responded with many hateful texts.

=== Relationship with Cindy Cunningham and Lizzie's death ===
In September 2023, it was revealed that Dave would get a "surprise story". Daniel Kilkelly fron Digital Spy had previously reported that he didn't feel Hollyoaks gave Dave storylines. In April 2023, he reported: " Dave feels like a character we still know nothing about, despite being in the show for over a year, and he has only appeared in a handful of scenes with Maxine since their father-daughter reveal." Power teased that these storylines would focus on his friendships with characters such a stalwarts Tony Hutchinson (Nick Pickard) and Darren Osborne (Ashley Taylor Dawson), as well as a relationship with Cindy Cunningham (Stephanie Waring). He spoke of these storylines in an interview with Inside Soap magazine: "He'll be getting up to no good with Ethan, we'll revisit his friendship with Tony [Hutchinson], and they'll be joined by Darren [Osborne] for something you won't see coming. And I think we've tapped into a rich vein with Dave and Cindy [Cunningham]..." Power also spoke about his responsibility in his brother Ethan Williams (Matthew James-Bailey) "dodgy streak". He explained: "I feel the brothers had a possible Del Boy and Rodney syndrome... I love coming up with ideas about their backstory." Power then explained his relationship with Cindy: "They make each other laugh and cancel out each other's quirks. Dave's ex-wife Honour (Vera Chok) definitely wore the trousers. I feel now he's able to put his trousers on! Dave was under the thumb and has new been released with a vengeance, and making up for lost time. He feels validated by Cindy and can't believe his luck. All Cindy wants is to feel loved, and I think she likes that glint in his eye. She even helps him set up his own handyman business, Dave's Handy Jobs!"

In January 2024, Cindy's niece Ella Richardson (Erin Palmer) was killed in a crash. Dave tried to support Cindy, but she pushed him away and even tried to diffuse an argument between Cindy and Suzanne Ashworth (Suzanne Hall) regarding the latter driving the former out of the village years before at Ella's celebration of life event. Dave shouted at everyone to be quiet and remember why they were there. Dave reminded Cindy that she still had him, and with that she leaves him in the pub. Peri Lomax (Ruby O'Donnell) asked Dave for more drugs, which he warned her of, but then she blackmailed him by threatening to tell everyone about his relapse. Peri left to take a shift at the hospital while Dave continued to drink and take drugs. Dave later emerged from the toilets clutching his chest in agony. In May 2024, Dave and Cindy get married. However, at the wedding reception, Lizzie (Lily Best) died after taking drugs supplied by Warren Fox (Jamie Lomas). This resulted in Dave seeking revenge and a feud with Warren. Dave disappeared whilst trying to save Hannah Ashworth (Emma Rigby) from her former boss Rex Gallagher (Jonny Labey). Dave overheard a conversation between Rex and Warren that the latter was the supplier of the fatal drugs that killed Lizzie. Dave and Cindy confront Warren over this and when Warren denies it, Dave mentions his sister Katy Fox (Hannah Tointon) who died of an overdose, causing Warren to punch Dave, which the police see and leads to his arrest.

=== Gangster past and Blue alias ===
In May 2024, Dave's daughter Lizzie (Lily Best) died after being supplied with dodgy drugs by Warren Fox (Jamie Lomas). On 9 August 2024, Dave was revealed to be the "mysterious gangster" named Blue. Dave was unmasked when he removed his motorcycle helmet to speak to former criminal acquaintance, Rex Gallagher (Jonny Labey). Lizzie's death reawakened this side of Dave after years of concentrating on being a "loyal family man." As a result, Dave was out for revenge on Warren. Before being unmasked, Dave fired a warning shot at Warren, sent him threatening messages and murdered his mother, Norma Crow (Glynis Barber) in cold blood. Power reacted to his character being revealed as Blue: "My reaction will hopefully be as surprised as the audience! And yes, it's been hard to keep the secret every now and again, because if I'm out talking to friends and work colleagues who obviously know because they're in the show, I might mention it and suddenly we realise that we're in a public space and we're talking about a heavily-guarded secret. Moments like that, I've had to catch myself and bite my tongue."

== Reception ==
In April 2023, after Honour's (Vera Chok) exit, Stephen Patterson from Metro described that his "dark side coming to the forefront." Patterson continued: "The character’s words are often misogynistic, with Dave himself even recognising that his comments in the past may have played a role in Mason (Frank Kauer) being groomed by incel and misogynist, Eric Foster (Angus Castle-Doughty)." Patterson also described Dave to be "an untapped character in terms of potential." Patterson said that Dave was "introduced as what you might’ve thought to be the ideal family man and patriarch, but as time went on, it became more and more evident that he’s not quite the man he claims to be." After Honour's departure, Daniel Kilkelly from Digital Spy suggested that Hollyoaks had failed the Chen-Williams family. He explained: "Hopes were high for Hollyoaks' newest clan when they arrived at the end of 2021. The show took a refreshing approach to their early episodes, introducing the characters in separate and seemingly unconnected storylines ahead of the big reveal at Christmas that they were all related." Kilkelly addressed how the issue addressed Dave's character in particular: "The male family members haven't fared much better, either. Dave feels like a character we still know nothing about, despite being in the show for over a year, and he has only appeared in a handful of scenes with Maxine since their father-daughter reveal."
