= Serena Chen-Williams =

Fictional character from Hollyoaks

- Hollyoaks character
- Portrayed by: Emma Lau
- Duration: 2021–23
- First appearance: 22 September 2021
- Last appearance: 24 January 2023
- Introduced by: Lucy Allan
In-universe information
- Other names: Galaxy
- Occupation: Athlete
- Mother: Honour Chen-Williams
- Adoptive father: Dave Chen-Williams
- Brothers: Sam Chen-Williams (step)
- Sisters: Lizzie Chen-Williams (adoptive)
- Half-brothers: Mason Chen-Williams
- Half-sisters: Maxine Minniver (adoptive)
- Uncles: Ethan Williams (adoptive)
- Aunts: Mei Lian Chen
- First cousins: Shing Lin Leong

Serena Chen-Williams (also Galaxy) is a fictional character from the Channel 4 British soap opera, Hollyoaks, played by Emma Lau. She originally appeared in a single episode originally broadcast on 22 September 2021 as a love interest for established character Sid Sumner (Billy Price). Lau later returned to the soap and began reappearing from December 2021 as part of a new family unit in Hollyoaks, consisting of Serena, her adoptive stepsister Lizzie Chen-Williams (Lily Best), Serena's step-uncle Ethan Williams (Matthew James-Bailey) and his girlfriend, Maya Harkwell (Ky Discala), Serena's mother Honour Chen-Williams (Vera Chok), Serena's stepfather Dave (Dominic Power), Honour and Dave's son Mason (Frank Kauer) and Dave's son Sam (Matthew McGivern). The family were the first East Asian family to appear in a British soap opera, which Lau was passionate about. Serena has been characterised as being a competitive athlete with an alter ego named "Galaxy", and Lau liked portraying both sides of the character. The actress initially was unaware of the alter-ego and believed she had been given the wrong script when she saw that her first scene was under the name "Galaxy". Lau also characterised Serena as being hardworking and emotional, which the actress related to.

Upon the family's move to the village, Serena struggles for her feelings towards Sid as he is now dating Lizzie, Serena's best friend and stepsister. Serena also faces Sinophobia linked to the COVID-19 pandemic from Becky Quentin (Katie McGlynn), which Lau believed was an important storyline that the soap was representing. Serena also begins a romance with Imran Maalik (Ijaz Rana), which ends due to Imran's eating disorder; Lau believed that Serena was better suited to Imran rather than Sid. Serena's other storylines include finding out that Maxine Minniver (Nikki Sanderson) is Dave's daughter, accidentally taking amphetamines, being forced to give up her place at the Commonwealth Games after falling from a café roof and being operated on by the unqualified doctor Ali Shahzad (Raji James), being threatened and taken hostage by incel Eric Foster (Angus Castle-Doughty) and finding out that Mason has been radicalised by Eric and carried out misogynistic actions himself. Serena's final storyline sees her disagree with her family on how to deal with Mason's actions and she subsequently leaves the household, leading to Serena's exit from the soap, which aired on 12 January 2023. Lau called her stint on the soap an honour and felt lucky with Serena's portrayal. Lau briefly reappeared as Serena in the episode originally airing on 24 January 2023. Serena and her family were initially popular with viewers. Digital Spy's Daniel Kilkelly praised Serena's initial guest appearance, but believed that Serena lacked screentime once she became a regular.

== Casting ==
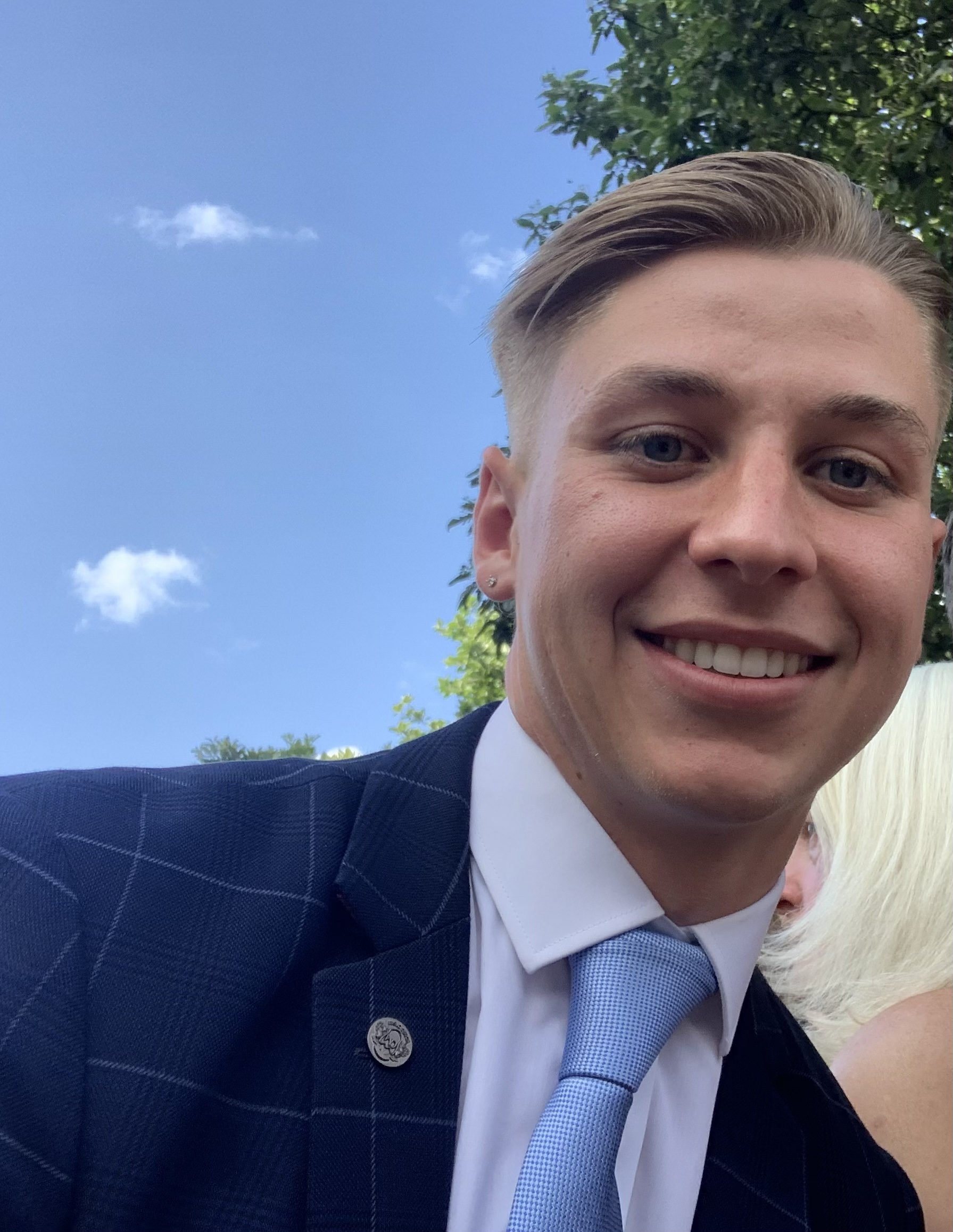
Serena was introduced as a love interest for Sid Sumner, played by Billy Price (pictured)

Emma Lau portrayed Serena. Her first appearance as Serena first aired on 22 September 2021. She was introduced as a love interest for established character Sid Sumner (Billy Price) and initially only appeared in one episode. After her initial appearance, Lau's return to the soap aired in December 2021. Lau was a regular cast member on the soap as Serena. Lau initially auditioned for the role of Serena and was told that the character was very "ambitious and sporty". Lau revealed, "Then I got my introductory episode and I was like: 'Whoa, Galaxy! Wait, she's a singer?' I was really confused. But then they explained it to me that this is an alter ego Serena goes to, as a release from the pressure she faces. That was really fun to do".

In November 2021, Hollyoaks released a winter trailer which revealed Serena would be returning to the soap and would be one of five new characters moving to Hollyoaks village, where the soap is set. The trailer also revealed that Serena's adoptive stepsister, Lizzie Chen-Williams (Lily Best), Serena's step-uncle Ethan Williams (Matthew James-Bailey) and his girlfriend, Maya Harkwell (Ky Discala), and Serena's mother Honour Chen-Williams (Vera Chok) would also be moving into the village, although it was not yet revealed that these characters were all part of the same family. In the trailer, Serena was depicted as being connected to Lizzie, and that Serena would be back as herself rather than Galaxy, her alter-ego. It was later revealed that the give characters were all part of the new "blended" Chen-Williams family, which also consisted of Honour's husband Dave (Dominic Power), Honour and Dave's son Mason (Frank Kauer) and Dave's son Sam (Matthew McGivern). They were described as a "close-knit clan" whose first scenes as a family involved them celebrating Christmas together at The Dog in the Pond. Most of the characters had been already introduced in seemingly unconnected storylines. Serena was depicted as being the sister and best friend of Lizzie, but it was teased that their bond could be tested over their mutual romantic feelings towards Sid. Chok explained that the pair's parents, Honour and Dave, have "been together for a long while and brought up this really adorable blended family". Before the cast members of the family began filming, they had a "workshop day" where they got to know each other and spoke about what they thought their characters were like and what they wanted, as well as doing some improv with the writers so that they could see how the cast members talk and move together.

The Chen-Williams family was the first East Asian family in a British soap opera and Chok revealed that there was also an East Asian director, writer and cultural advisor in the soap opera. Lau was passionate about being part of the first East Asian family in a soap opera. Talking about her experience of being in the soap in January 2022, Lau told Digital Spy, "It's been going really well so far. I've really enjoyed it". She believed that the people in Liverpool, where Hollyoaks is filmed, and the people on the set of the soap were very friendly; she added, "It's quite refreshing to walk onto such a welcoming set. To film regularly has been a great learning experience". Lau believed that the cast of her family were very nice and that they got on well. She added, "With Lily, it's like we're sisters in real life, which is really nice. I was there for her screen test and the chemistry was great". In July 2022, Lau said that she would like to work more with McGivern, who plays Sam, as the pair did not have many scenes together. She also said that one of her castmates that she wanted to work with more was the "lovely" Eva O'Hara, who played Verity Hutchinson, and that O'Hara and Lau asked one of the writers to write a scene for them at the 2022 British Soap Awards. In November 2022, it was announced that Serena's cousin, Shing Lin Leong, played by Izzie Yip, would be introduced the following month, thus expanding the Chen-Williams family.

== Characterisation ==
"Serena is a very emotional person. She is an athlete and very performance-based and I think that involves so much emotion. She also sees things as very black and white – either something is right or something is wrong."

— Lau on Serena's characterisation (2022)

An official Hollyoaks video highlighting the Chen-Williams family named Serena "The sister who loves to party". In July 2022, Lau teased that Serena's alter ego Galaxy could reappear. Lau liked exploring the two sides to her character, adding, "It's really fun! When I shot my first episode, the whole scene was under the name Galaxy, and I thought I had the wrong script. It's great to play them both – Serena is very sensible, and her style is very preppy. Then you have Galaxy and there are some wild looks, I've had to spend hours in hair and makeup". Serena was also characterised as being a competitive athlete. The reason for the Chen-Williams moving to Hollyoaks village is so that she can achieve her Olympic dreams. Lau said that she does not excel at sports like Serena does, but believed that she and her character are both neurotic, hardworking and emotional. Serena and her siblings were depicted as being born in Britain, whilst Honour is an immigrant, and Chok revealed that they think differently about their culture and heritage.

== Development ==
=== Love triangle and sister reveal ===
During Serena's initial appearance, Sid flirts with Serena, who introduces herself as "Galaxy". Sid had woken up after getting drunk the night before and was unaware of where his prosthetic leg is, and he ends up getting a text from Galaxy, who gives him his leg back and tells him "embarrassing stories" of his drunken behaviour the previous night. Galaxy compliments Sid on his looks, which boosts his confidence as he had doubted himself over getting into a relationship since his amputation. Galaxy also tells Sid that she had misled Sid, as she claimed the previous night to be a famous musician from China, but instead participates in karaoke competitions in the UK. When she leaves, she agrees to see Sid again next time she is in town, and she then takes a phone call, which reveals that her real name is Serena.

A love triangle is then formed by Serena's return several months later; when Sid begins a romantic connection with Lizzie, things become complicated when Galaxy returns. She reveals that her real name is Serena and immediately entices Sid; however, it is then revealed that she has a connection with Lizzie and so Serena and Sid pretend to not know each other in order to protect Lizzie's feelings. Sid also finds out that Lizzie and Serena are sisters. Discussing the love triangle, Lau explained in early 2022, "Serena still really likes Sid. They had a spark on their night out last year and then it continued when she took his leg hostage! The feelings probably grew a bit more then". The actress added that Serena was surprised to find out that Sid was the guy that Lizzie was seeing, explaining, "It's difficult, because Lizzie really likes Sid. Lizzie isn't just Serena's sister, she's her best friend. So Serena has tried to close that door because it can't happen. Serena has tried to shut down her feelings, but maybe that's not the best thing to do. Suppressing your feelings is never a wise thing to do." Best explained that the situation would be very difficult for Lizzie as she really likes Sid but Serena is "one of her favourite people in the world"; the actress added that if Lizzie found out about Serena and Sid's history, it would hit "Lizzie like a ton of bricks. I don't think she'll expect it at all. I think it'll be really hard for her, because she obviously loves her sister". However, Best also believed that Lizzie would step aside for Serena to be with Sid if she felt that they were meant to be, adding, "She loves Serena too much and wouldn't want to affect her badly at all. So I think she would be willing to, but whether she does or not is the question!" Best also teased that Lizzie suspects that something is off with Sid, but it would be a "big deal" if she found out that Sid has feelings for her sister.

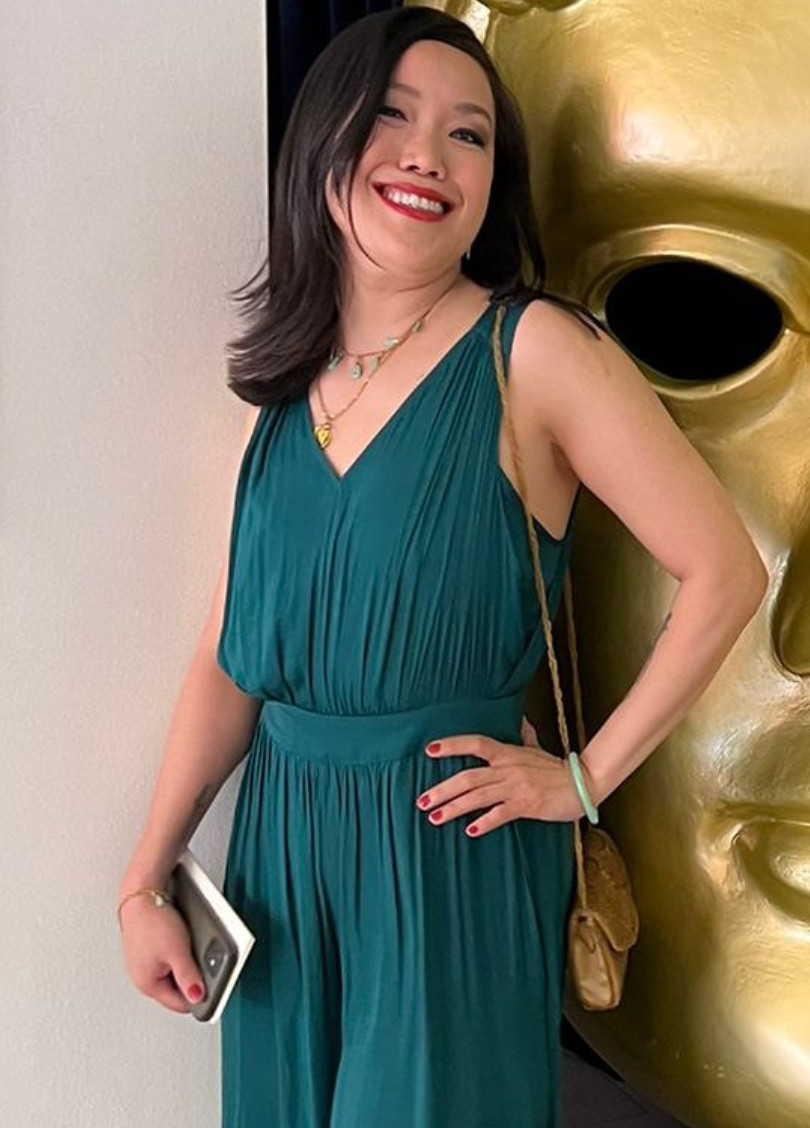
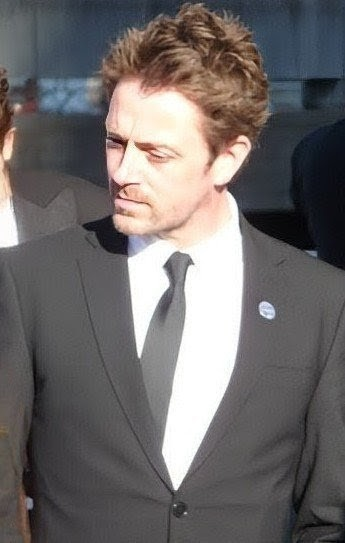
Vera Chok (left) and Dominic Power (right) portrayed Serena's mother and stepfather, respectively.

Serena, Lizzie and Sam become suspicious of Dave meeting up with Maxine Minniver (Nikki Sanderson) and they believe that he is betraying Honour; they are unsure of how to tell Honour, and they then decide to investigate the situation when they hear Dave telling Maxine that he is committed to her. Lau opined that those were "fun episodes". However, the siblings then find out that Maxine is Dave's daughter. Lau explained that Serena finds out the truth difficult to handle as Dave has kept this a secret from his other children for years. Serena continues to struggle with Sid and Lizzie's relationship, and when Lizzie invites Sid to their family games night, Serena ends up revealing a secret when things become competitive.

Serena's family are depicted celebrating Lunar New Year in a special episode broadcast in early 2022, with Hollyoaks becoming the first British soap opera to celebrate it. Of the decision to celebrate this, Lau explained, "It's so exciting that Hollyoaks have included Lunar New Year. Being part of the first East Asian family on a British soap is so exciting and it's a really important tradition to include and share with everyone. Every big city has a Chinatown and some sort of celebration during Lunar New Year, so it's nice to include it." Chok also praised the soap for having the family celebrate Lunar New Year and spoke about its importance. Lau also explained that the episodes would depict Serena's relationship with her culture, in addition to her relationship with Sid. In the storyline, Dave and Honour decide to celebrate Lunar New Year as a family, but Serena and her siblings are not in the mood to do so as they recently found out Dave's secret regarding Maxine. That same night, Serena decides to admit her feelings to Sid. Lau explained that Serena tried to do the "right thing" and "close off" her feelings for Sid, but as she is going through difficult things in her life, the pressure from those and her feelings for Sid overwhelm her and so she "just has to" declare her feelings and she kisses him. However, she finds out that she actually was speaking to and kissed Imran Maalik (Ijaz Rana) as he and Sid are both dressed up as Chinese red dragons, leaving Serena mortified. Sam also gets suspicious and confronts Serena, with Lau explaining that "Serena tries to shake it off and act cool, but Sam is her big brother so he knows!" Lau revealed that she got along with both Price and Rana.

Chok spoke about the impact of the love triangle between Sid and her two daughters, telling Digital Spy, "I think that it's a surprise to Honour. It's the worst nightmare, isn't it? Your two daughters, who are the exact same age, have fallen for the same guy. How do you navigate that? One is your blood daughter and one is your adopted daughter and they're so different. I think Honour does struggle to give sensible boy advice, but Dave is the mother hen. Serena and Lizzie are not just sisters but best friends, so hopefully they'll be able to work it out. I don't know whether Sid is going to survive them fighting over him, though!"

As Lizzie and Sid's relationship gets more serious, Serena isolates herself from the couple and this causes tension with Lizzie, who confronts Serena as to why she is in a bad mood. Lizzie assumes that Serena does not like Sid because of her past involvement with him and she tries to make them get along by making them see The Batman movie together in an attempt to bond. Serena then tells Lizzie that she is nervous to be with Sid alone and admits that she does not dislike Sid but actually still has feelings for him. Serena and Lizzie then wonder how they will navigate the situation. The sisters are at odds at how they can get over Serena's feelings and Serena realises that she was mostly focussing on what Sid had meant to Galaxy, her alter-ego. Serena shows that she is accepting of Sid and Lizzie's relationship by planning a dinner for them. Sid and Lizzie ultimately stay together, and in July 2022, Lau told Inside Soap that she did not think that there would be a chance of Serena and Sid rekindling a romance. Lau explained, "It's got to the point where Sid is Lizzie's, and I hope that's clear now. There has to be some sisterly loyalty".

=== Sinophobia ===
Hollyoaks decided to explore racism through Serena's character. The storyline came months after studies showed that anti-Asian hate speech online and hate crimes against East and Southeast Asian people in the UK had increased, with both being linked to the COVID-19 pandemic. In January 2022, Serena is central to a "difficult Sinophobia storyline", where Becky Quentin (Katie McGlynn) becomes aggressive when she sees Serna carrying a parcel from China, leading to Becky making derogatory comments about China and the COVID-19 pandemic to Serena. Becky "cruelly" berates Serena for ordering a package from China and uses conspiracy theories regarding the pandemic to justify her "racial outburst", which really upsets Serena. Honour, along with Cindy Cunningham (Stephanie Waring), later confronts Becky and threatens to report this as a hate crime if she continues hurting her family.

Lau explained that Becky's racist comments are linked to the COVID-19 pandemic, which she called a "really important issue" that the soap was "tackling and representing". She explained, "It has been rampant during COVID. I know friends who've experienced it and it's horrible. It's great that Hollyoaks is delving into that issue. For Serena, she's had experience of this as it's happened to her before. I think it hits her quite badly, so she's going through a lot in upcoming episodes." Chok wrote on social media that she was "grateful" that Hollyoaks was bringing Sinophobia "to light", and added, "The pandemic was and remains a difficult time for anyone who looks vaguely Chinese. The history of under-reporting or ignoring racism towards people of East Asian descent is very sad. Please support inclusion and anti-racism." McGlynn wrote on social media how it was an important storyline to highlight due to the "huge rise of Sinophobia" and how it was important to call it out as racism, and noted how playing Becky made her uncomfortable due to Becky having views that the actress does not share at all, although noted that people like that "unfortunately" exist in real life, as well as urging any viewers affected to seek support via the Channel 4 website.

=== Drugs ===
In March 2022, it was reported that Lizzie and Serena could learn about Sid's drug-dealing past, which begins when Clara (Eleanor Kirby), a teenager who used to get drugs from him, pressures Sid into supplying her with drugs again. Clara then does athletics training with Serena and Sid asks her to keep their past a secret from Serena and Lizzie's family due to Lizzie's anti-drug stance. Clara tries to blackmail Sid for amphetamines but he declines, giving her a number to helpline instead; however, this is wrongly interpreted by Sam and he accuses Sid of drug dealing in front of Serena, Lizzie and Dave. Serena and Lizzie both struggle with this claim. Clara gets the amphetamines from elsewhere and Serena accidentally injects them when she drinks from the wrong water bottle, putting her in danger. Serena almost has a heart attack and recovers in hospital, whilst her family blames Sid as they believe he gave Clara the drugs. When Serena becomes conscious again, Honour tells her that she has to take a break from athletics competitions as she will be otherwise be disqualified for having drugs in her system, which devastates Serena. Meanwhile, Sid is cleared by the police and Lizzie gives him another chance, and it is later revealed that Ethan supplied Clara with the amphetamines. Serena remains heartbroken by the news that she cannot attend the qualifiers and tells Lizzie she feels that she "letting all her dreams slip away"; Serena also ignores Dave's advice and "throws herself into her fitness regime".

=== Romance with Imran ===
Serena later begins a romance with Imran. In May 2022, Imran goes on a date with Serena, which he is excited about. Imran fails to impress Serena on several dates, which do not go to plan, and it becomes clear that there is something on Imran's mind as he is struggling with his eating disorder. Imran's friends and boss support him with one of the dates, which involves a meal and a game of football. However, Imran gets worried and leaves when Serena suggests that they do something more intimate. Imran confides in Sid on why he dismissed Serena and Imran is on edge when Serena unexpectedly visits him after he has been avoiding her. Things then get more awkward when Imran's mother, Misbah, forces the pair to talk. Ijaz Rana, who played Imran, explained that Imran likes Serena a lot, and that as Serena is really into keeping fit and training, Imran is trying to learn about Serena's diet as he wants to bond with her but he is also using her to get information out of her due to his eating disorder. Rana explained that the dates do not go well, which impacts Imran as he really likes Serena and is dealing with a lot. Rana called the scene where Imran makes Serena his favourite dish, which he has named after her, "cute" and a "lovely scene". Rana said that he worked well together with Lau, calling her "amazing", and said that there is always a "good vibe" when they are on set, and that they cannot stop laughing when they do scenes with Best (Lizzie) and Price (Sid). Lau enjoyed working with Rana, calling him "lovely" and "very funny". Lau believed that Imran and Serena were "sweet" together, adding, "Imran's adorable. However, Serena's an elite athlete who deals with macro diets and training, which can be a negative influence on Imran". Lau also opined that Imran is much better for Serena than Sid.

=== Accident ===
In mid 2022, Serena ends up having a serious injury. It was reported that the injury would lead to Serena receiving "life-changing news". In the storyline, Serena gets "amazing news" and is "over the moon" when she finds out that she has gotten a place in the Commonwealth Games. However, Serena's parent's are unaware of the secret training that she has been doing, which is an issue. There is also further tension when Serena finds out that Dave was going to use Serena's athletic fund money to pay for Maxine's daughter Minnie's (Eva Rooney and Ava Lorente) afterschool care. The situation leads to Maxine accidentally blurting out Serena's parents that she has been selected for Commonwealth Games.

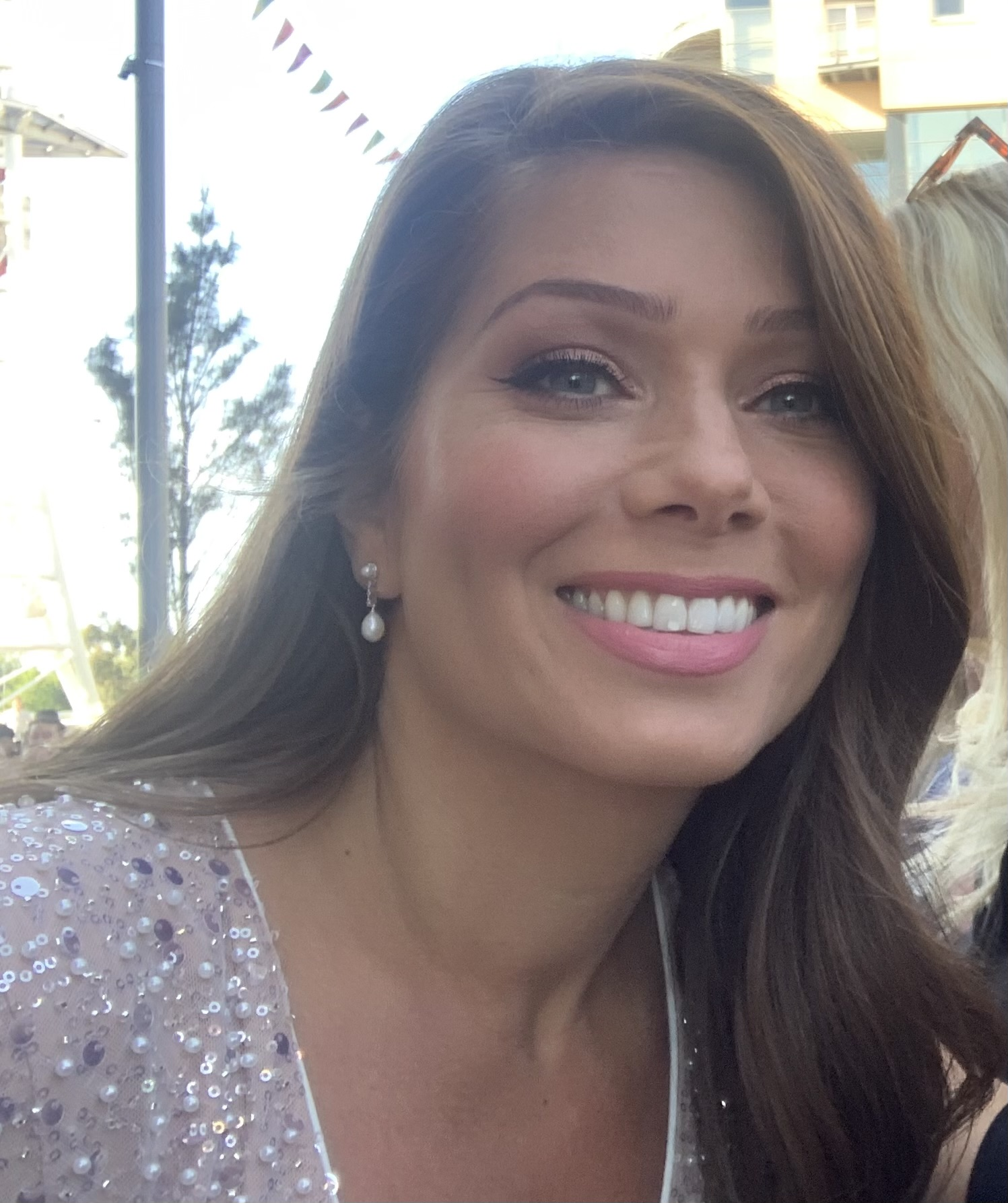
Nikki Sanderson (pictured) portrayed Maxine Minniver.

Serena ends up going on a night out with Maxine and Lizzie to celebrate her place, which Maxine has arranged to make it up to her; however, a competition between the sisters leads to a tipsy Serena ends up falling off a playground house, leading to her being rushed to hospital and her family waiting anxiously on results of her injury. Lau explained that whilst Serena was celebrating, her alter-ego Galaxy took over, resulting in Serena getting drunk and climbing on top of a kiosk, which results in her falling. It appears that Serena has a broken leg, and Doctor Ali Shahzad (Raji James), one of Hollyoaks's villains, makes a "rash decision" to operate on her so that she can still take part in the Commonwealth games, despite Ali being an oncologist, which concerns his colleague Misbah Maalik (Harvey Virdi). Ali does this as he wants to take back control as most of the hospital's staff support Misbah, who was raped by Ali. Virdi explained that Ali is trying prove that he is the "big doctor" and teased that he "starts making decisions that are going to lead to him getting his comeuppance". Lau explained that whilst Serena is already badly injured, it gets worse when Dr Ali operates on her as she ends up sustaining ligament and tendon damage.

Serena's family supports her, but she ends up receiving "heartbreaking" news that changes her life and destroys her Olympic dreams. Lau further explained to Inside Soap's Alice Penwill that Serena's career in sports is now over, adding, "It's devastating. Serena has a bit of an existential crisis because she doesn't know who she is without sport". The actress teased that this could result in Galaxy emerging more. Inside Soap also teased that Serena would need a long time to recover from the injury.

=== Misogyny and departure ===
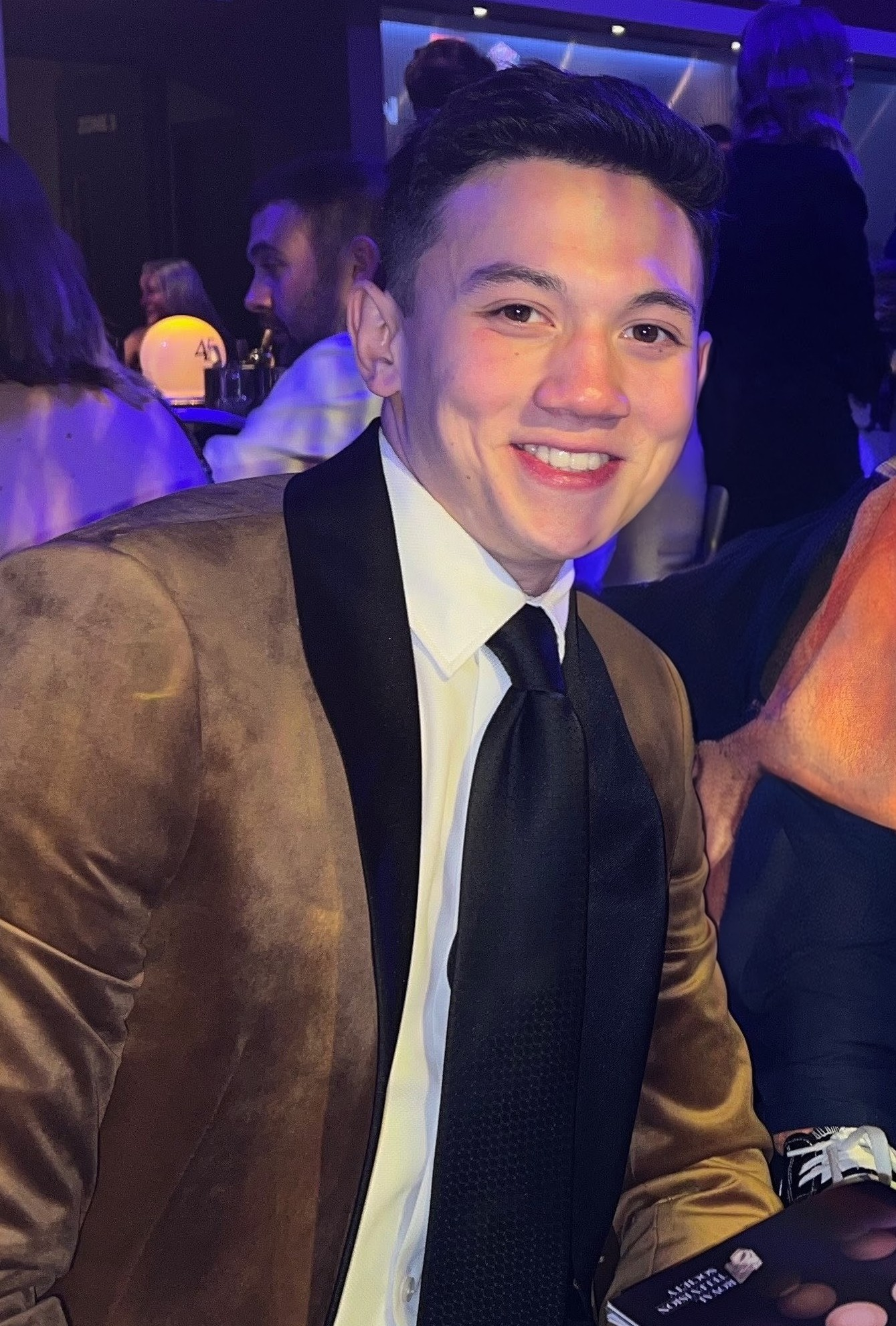
Frank Kauer (pictured) portrayed Serena's half-brother Mason.

In January 2023, Hollyoaks aired a special one-hour episode which saw radical misogynist Eric Foster (Angus Castle-Doughty) hold Serena, Lizzie, Maxine and other characters hostage and threatening their lives with a crossbow in The Dog in the Pond pub, having already shot his sister-in-law Diane Hutchinson (Alex Fletcher), as the conclusion of Eric's radical misogny storyline. The sisters plea with Eric to set them free but Eric rants about how women have robbed him of a normal life and Zoe Anderson (Garcia Brown) reveals that he is an incel. After Maxine – who had previously being held captive by Eric before escaping – berates Eric, he shoots her with the crossbow and the other women then tackle him down as the police come in. Producer Lucy Allan said of the special episode, "We always knew we wanted to build to that climax because we always wanted to articulate the level of danger there is and the echochamber that Eric finds himself utterly absorbed within". Serena and Lizzie struggle to come to terms what has happened.

Serena and her family subsequently learn that Eric has groomed and radicalised Serena's teenage brother Mason, who has leaked photos of his female classmates online, sent threatening messages, covered for Eric when he found out that he was spiking drinks in the village and posted misogynistic messages on an incel forum, where he met Eric. There is subsequently a "huge row" in the family due to the "dark revelations". Serena is shocked to find this out and calls Mason out; Serena wants to get the police involved, but her parents do not want to, which upsets Serena even more. Serena is also angry at her parents for not telling her as soon as they found out. Serena opens up about how when men have taken creepy pictures of her, she has been unable to react out of fear that something worse will happen. Serena also tells Mason she no longer wants anything to do with him now that she has seen his anger and his true self. Allan explained that viewers were seeing the "ramifications of what can happen when you realise what a 15-year-old has been up to under your roof". Chok believed that this was the biggest challenge that the Chen-Williams family had ever faced. Frank Kauer, who played Mason, explained that Lizzie and Serena are angry at what Mason has done and teased that it had torn the family apart.

This storyline eventually led to Serena's unannounced exit from Hollyoaks, which aired on 12 January 2023. In the episode, Dave and Honour are shocked when Serena reveals that she gave Mason's laptop to the police, which leads to him being charged for harassing Leah Barnes (Ela-May Demircan). Serena is horrified that her family wants to support Mason to keep the family together, though Mason believes that Serena giving the police the laptop was the right thing to do. Serena then tells her parents that they need to choose between her and Mason as she can no longer live like this, but Lizzie makes her realise that it is not fair to ask her parents to choose between their children and Serena subsequently tells Dave and Honour that she will not make them choose. Serena praises her parents for the support they have given her over the years and that she cannot expect her parents to not do the same for Mason, adding that she cannot forgive her and will have to learn to live with it. Serena also tells Lizzie that she does not want to see Mason homeless but is worried that he will turn into Eric if their parents do not stop "coddling him". After a "heartfelt" hug with Honour, Serena secretly and quickly leaves the household with her suitcase as she is unable to live with Mason anymore, giving her house a "a final tearful glance". It was then confirmed that Lau had left the series, with the actress saying, "So, Serena's left the village! Not the happiest circumstances, but drama is in the unhappiness, so what can you do?" Lau called her stint on the soap an "honour", adding, "I've been incredibly gifted with the role of Serena. I've got to play two characters in one. Serena the serious athlete and Galaxy the wild party girl! It's been such a joy." It was also confirmed that Serena had filmed her final scenes in late 2022. Following Lau's departure, it was announced that Serena would make a brief reappearance via a video call, where Mason apologises to his family. Her brief reappearance aired in Episode 6033, originally broadcast and released on 24 January 2023. Serena was the first member of the Chen-Williams family to leave the soap. Chok also ended up leaving the soap opera as Honour several months later.

== Storylines ==
Serena meets Sid Sumner (Billy Price) on a night out and she returns his prosthetic leg to him the following day. The pair flirt and agree to meet next time Serena is in town. She reveals to him that her real name is Serena, having introduced herself as Galaxy. The pair do not speak and a few months later, Serena and her family move to Hollyoaks, a decision they made due to support Serena's athletic training. Serena is horrified to learn that Sid is now dating her stepsister Lizzie Chen-Williams (Lily Best) and Sid is conflicted on who to be with. Serena rejects him to help Lizzie, who she is very close to, but she struggles with her feelings. Serena discovers Dave with a mystery woman and believes that she is cheating, but it actually revealed that the woman is Dave's firstborn daughter, Maxine Minniver (Nikki Sanderson), who Lizzie and her siblings did not know about. Serena struggles with the revelation and on Lunar New Year, Sid comforts her. Serena confesses her feelings about Sid and seemingly kisses him, but she actually kisses Imran Maalik (Ijaz Rana) as he and Sid are both dressed up as Chinese red dragons. Sid sees this and is aware of Serena's feelings. After Lizzie begins believing that Serena does not like Sid due to not wanting to be with him alone, Serena ends up being honest about her feelings and tries to show Lizzie and Sid that she supports their relationship.

Serena is hospitalised after drinking from a water bottle that unknowingly has amphetamines in it. Serena is devastated that she might be unable to qualify for the Commonwealth Games due to having drugs in her system. Serena confides in Imran and the pair begin dating. Serena later finds out that she has been selected to represent England in the Commonwealth Games, though she is upset to learn that her stepfather Dave (Dominic Power) was planning to use Serena's athletic fund money to pay for Maxine's daughter Minnie's (Eva Rooney and Ava Lorente) afterschool care. Serena ends up getting drunk with Maxine and Lizzie and falls off the roof of a café. Her injury is made worse when unqualified doctor Ali Shahzad (Raji James) performs bad surgery on her leg. Serena is devastated when she finds out that she can no longer take part in the Commonwealth Games and relies on Imran during this. Imran, however, breaks up with her when she wants something more intimate as he is struggling with an eating disorder. Serena spirals and begins partying a lot and has sex with Joseph Holmes (Olly Rhodes), but she stops after Dave talks to her about her behaviour.

Serena and Lizzie are several villagers taken hostage by incel Eric Foster (Angus Castle-Doughty) in the Dog in the Pond Pub. Eric uses Serena as a human shield and threatens everyone with a crossbow, blaming women for not having a regular life. Eric shoots Maxine and the other women tackle him. He is subsequently arrested and the Chen-Williams family find out that Serena's teenage half-brother Mason Chen-Williams (Frank Kauer) was associated with Eric and posted misogynistic comments in an incel chatroom. Against her parents' wishes, Serena gives the police Mason's laptop and Serena does not believe that she can forgive Mason. Serena tells her family to choose between her and Mason but after talking to Lizzie, she decides against this and secretly leaves the family to live with her biological father in Shanghai. Serena refuses to come home as her wishes are not being respected by her parents and Mason later apologises to Serena on video-call for his behaviour.

== Reception ==
Following Serena's initial appearance, Daniel Kilkelly from Digital Spy called the character "mysterious" and questioned whether she would appear again. He later called the scenes where Serena experiences Sinophobia "upsetting". Discussing Serena's love triangle with Sid and Lizzie a few months later, Justin Harp from the same website called it a "romantic conundrum" for Sid and questioned which of the sisters he would end up with. Harp's colleague, Daniel Kilkelly, believed that there were unresolved feelings between Sid and Serena and questioned whether the pair would end up together. Kilkelly had previously speculated that Serena and Lizzie could be heading towards trouble due to their shared feelings over Sid. Tess Lamacraft from What to Watch believed that Serena and her siblings were in "meltdown" after discovering that Dave was Maxine's father. Lamacraft also called the scenes where Serena accidentally kisses Imran due to thinking he was Sid "awkward". Discussing the "teen love triangle", in March 2022, Justin Harp from Digital Spy called Serena's confession that she still has feelings for Sid "surprising" and also called the situation between Serena and Lizzie regarding Sid "thorny". Harp's colleague, Bridie Adams, later wrote that viewers had speculated whether Serena and Sid would get back together, and she also believed that it could be a possibility despite Lau ruling it out due to it being in "soapland". Following the announcement of Serena's family, Stephen Patterson from Metro opined that it was "safe to say" that the family would "make their mark on the eponymous village!" Patterson also believed that there had been "tension aplenty" between Serena and Sid since their initial "passion several months ago" and called them "mainstays" of the soap; he also believed that Serena confessing her feelings about Sid to Lizzie was awkward. Patterson also praised Serena, Lizzie and Sid's reference to The Batman, calling it a "hilarious and timely scene".

The Chen-Williams were initially popular with viewers and were longlisted for "Best Family" in the 2022 Inside Soap Awards. Kilkelly called Serena accidentally taking amphetamines a shocking cliff-hanger, commenting, "A mix-up has frightening consequences". Kilkelly also believed that things were "seeming bleak" for Serena due to her forced interruption from taking part in sporting competitions. Patterson called Serena accidentally taking the drugs a "tragedy" and a "devastating drugs mistake". Lamacraft from What to Watch wondered if Imran had ruined his chances with Serena by leaving after she suggested to do something intimate. Lamacraft's colleague, Simon Timblick, called Serena's fall from the playground roof an "unfortunate" and "ill-fated night out". Timblick also wondered whether Serena's "mishap" could jeopardise her place in the Commonwealth Games and added, "Ouch! It's not looking good for Serena" due to her being rushed to hospital. Stefania Sarrubba from Digital Spy speculated that Serena's "shock" accident could lead to Ali's downfall due to exposing his true colours. Metro's Patterson wondered if Serena would have to "pay a huge price" for Ali's decision to operate on her and wrote that "future hopes and dreams are hanging in the balance", calling her fall a tragedy. Harp called Serena's Commonwealth news and her accident a "tumultuous period" for Serena. Inside Soap's Alice Penwill noted how Serena felt lost after the "shocking accident" and how Ali's "cock-up" caused devastation for Serena and her family. Penwill also questioned whether the romance between "Loved-up" Imran and Serena would last. Patterson highly praised the episode where Serena and other characters are held hostage and threatened with a crossbow by Eric. He also believed that it was understandable that Serena was upset over the revelations of Mason's misogynistic behaviour.

Patterson believed that Serena's exit storyline had "heartbreaking scenes". In April 2023, following Honour's departure from the soap, Kilkelly wrote a piece for Digital Spy where he opined that Hollyoaks had "failed" the Chen-Williams family despite them initially debuting with "such promise". Kilkelly believed that the family members being introduced in separate unconnected storylines was a "refreshing approach" that the soap took and that Serena and Lizzie's love triangle seemed to be a storyline potential, as well as praising Serena's "powerful scenes" that showed how Sinophobia was increasing following the COVID-19 pandemic. However, he criticised the direction that Hollyoaks took the family and wrote, "Serena was a breath of fresh air when she was brought in as her fun-loving alter ego Galaxy in September 2021, but she lacked any real screen time or storylines once she was brought back as a regular". He also criticised the long gaps between Serena's appearances and hoped that they wouldn't repeat it with Shing Lin. Despite this, Kilkelly praised the "electrifying scenes" that occurred when Mason's behaviour was exposed, opining that the "actors clearly relished the opportunity they'd been given, as the family came to life on screen again in a barnstorming episode". Kilkelly's colleagues, Katie Francis and Sam Warner, both called Serena's exit "emotional".
