= Vera Chok =

Malaysian actress

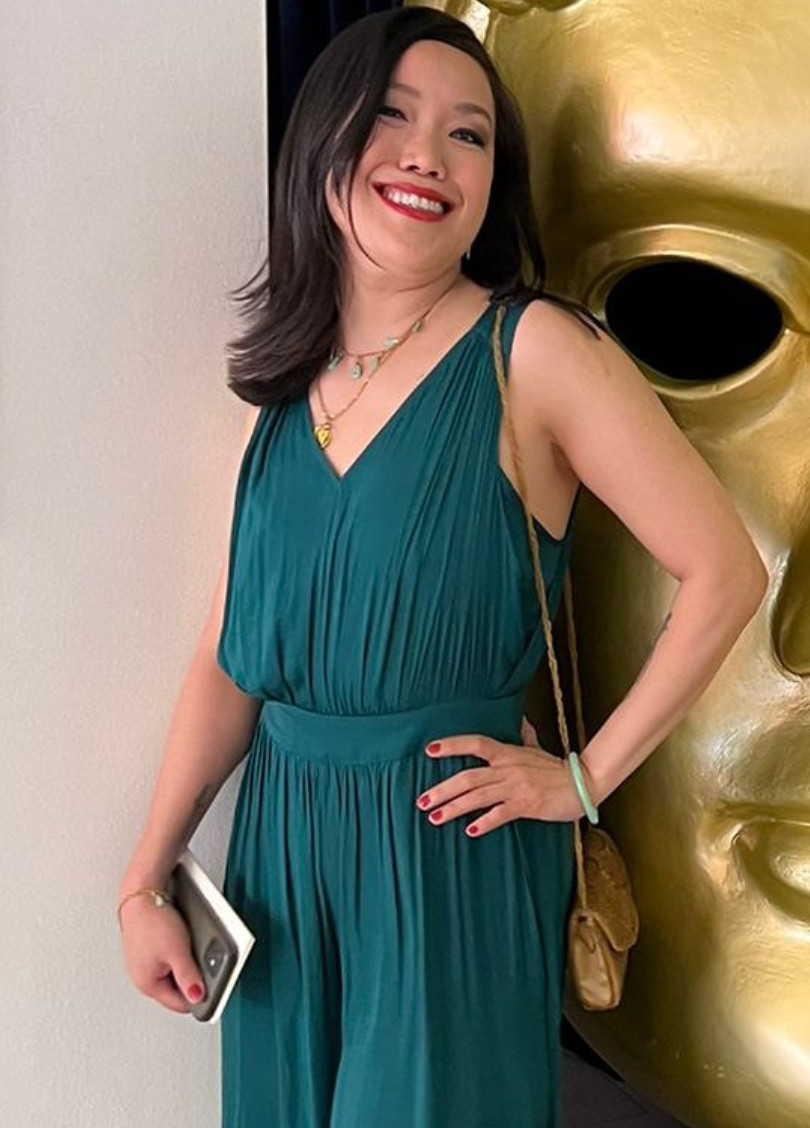
- Chok in 2022
- Born: Petaling Jaya, Selangor, Malaysia
- Education: The Queen's College, Oxford; The Poor School
- Occupations: Actor; writer
- Years active: 2000–present
- Website: beautifulbitchmonsteridiot.com//

Vera Chok is a Malaysian actress, who has featured in various stage, screen and radio roles. From 2021 to 2023, she (Note: Chok uses both she/her and they/them pronouns. This article uses she/her pronouns for consistency.) played Honour Chen-Williams in the Channel 4 soap opera Hollyoaks.

== Early and personal life ==
Chok was born in Petaling Jaya, Malaysia, of Chinese ancestry. After attending Assunta Primary and Secondary schools in Malaysia and Abbots Bromley School in Staffordshire, she graduated from The Queen's College, Oxford, before training as an actor at the Poor School in London and with Philippe Gaulier in Paris. Chok is queer and uses she/her and they/them pronouns.

== Career ==
Chok's main theatre roles have included parts in the award-winning Lucy Kirkwood play Chimerica (2013), as part of the original cast at the Almeida and Harold Pinter Theatres and in The World of Extreme Happiness (The Shed at the Royal National Theatre, 2013), in which she co-starred with Katie Leung. Chok played the part of Ming Ming, a female migrant worker, in a production about the world of migrant workers in rapidly emerging modern China. She also reprised her Chimerica role in the TV miniseries version broadcast on Channel 4 in 2019, where she once again co-starred alongside Katie Leung.

In 2015, Chok appeared in Nicholas Hytner's final production as artistic director for the National Theatre, Tom Stoppard's The Hard Problem. The play was Stoppard's first for the theatre since 2006 and a special screening was broadcast live to cinemas. She subsequently had roles in the Kenneth Branagh Theatre Company production of The Winter's Tale at the Garrick Theatre in late 2015 and an associated work, Terence Rattigan's Harlequinade, also at the Garrick, which humorously depicts a postwar CEMA-sponsored theatrical troop at a provincial theatre in Brackley making a hash of Romeo and Juliet and "the intrigues and dalliances of the company members".

Chok was nominated in the 2015 BBC Audio Drama Awards (Best Debut Performance In An Audio Drama) for her performance in the BBC Radio 3 production of British Chinese novelist Xiaolu Guo's first play, Dostoevsky And The Chickens (2014), in which she co-starred. In Liao Yimei's comedy drama Rhinoceros in Love, also for Radio 3, she plays the beautiful Mingming, the object of a zookeeper's longing, in a performance described by The Sunday Times as 'bewitching'.

She appeared in Jingo (2008, Finborough Theatre, London) and played the lead role of Lila in the stage adaptation of Philip Pullman's The Firework-Maker's Daughter (2011, Theatre by the Lake) - described by The Stage as a 'poignant performance'.

WhatsOnStage.com named her one of "15 theatre faces to look out for in 2015". Asked by the magazine to give her advice on International Women's Day, Chok said "Play the long game: stay open, generous, and keep developing your craft."

In 2016, she contributed a chapter to The Good Immigrant, an anthology of the personal accounts of members of immigrant and ethnic minorities in the UK. Writing about her experiences as a Malaysian immigrant in Britain in The Guardian during Black History Month, Chok commented on the invisibility of 'East Asian' groups in Britain: "In the UK media, we don’t see south Asians portrayed in a way that reflects their position as the largest racial minority group in the UK (3 million to 1.9 million black British). East Asians, the third-largest and fastest-growing racial group at 1.2 million, people bear the damning “model minority” label which isolates them from other people of colour, and condemns them to an invisibility where violence against them is ignored." Writing in British Chinese journal Neehao in 2017, she urged British Chinese and East Asian actors not to take on parts that reinforce anti-China sentiment at a time when " ...Asians in America, in LIBERAL states, are being beaten up because of anti-China rhetoric from [Donald Trump]."

She wrote a play for online, Rice!, broadcast on Zoom in 2021, a co-production between Omnibus Theatre and Malaysian company Wayang Kitchen, which featured a distributed Malaysian meal to cook at home with tutorial help, plus a play broadcast from Kuala Lumpur and Wiltshire, according to The Stage "an elegant proposition: playing to audiences in both the UK and Malaysia, this story about migration and belonging unfolds while we cook congee with meal kits provided by the company".

In December 2021, Chok began playing Honour Chen-Williams, a prison psychiatrist, in the British TV soap Hollyoaks. Her character was one of parents of the newly introduced Chen-Williams family, alongside her delivery driver husband Dave, played by Dominic Power. Chok told media that “Dave and Honour have a very large brood, so it's a really solid relationship. They've been together for a long while and brought up this really adorable blended family". Her final appearance in the soap aired in April 2023.

She played the lead role in the 2022 Forest Fringe film Dream Agency, directed and written by Deborah Pearson and Andy Field, which won the Best Micro-Budget film award in 2023 from the London Independent Film Festival.

Chok played Lauren in the second UK touring production of 2:22 A Ghost Story, from 2023–24, alongside Jay McGuiness as Ben, George Rainsford as Sam and Fiona Wade as Jenny.

== Poetry ==
Chok published a collection of poetry, Angry Yellow Woman, in 2024.

- Angry Yellow Woman. Burning Eye. 2024. ISBN 978-1-913958-47-3.

== Filmography ==
=== Film ===
Year	Title	Role	Notes
2007	Heartless	Lily	London Film School, Sasha Collington
2007	The Games	Athlete	Audience Award, East End Film Festival (2008), Optimistic Productions, Hilary Powell
2008	Son	Dancer	Sister Films, Daniel Mulloy
2010	The Heights	Mrs Watson	BBC/Shorthouse, Sue Dunderdale
2011	Random 11	Candace	VertigoHeights, TS Ukpo
2012	Alice 3	Alice	VertigoHeights, TS Ukpo
2012	After the World Ended	Anna	VertigoHeights, TS Ukpo
2012	Panic	Ling	White Night Films, Sean Spencer
2013	The Riot Club (released September 2014)	Banker	Blueprint, Lone Scherfig
2014	Alice in the City (working title)	Alice	TS Ukpo
2014	Lucky 13	Mallory	TS Ukpo
2015	Miss You Already	Chang Zhe Tzung	New Sparta/S Films, Catherine Hardwicke
2016	Simana		VertigoHeights, TS Ukpo
2017	The Mummy	Prodigium Tech	Universal Pictures, Alex Kurtzman
2018	Christopher Robin	Margaret King (Train Passenger 1)	Walt Disney Pictures, Marc Forster
2018	London Unplugged	Laura	
2022	Dream Agency	Janet (lead role)	Forest Fringe, Arthouse Jersey, Deborah Pearson
2026	Clayface	Matt Hagen's lawyer	DC Studios, James Watkins

=== Television ===
Year	Title	Role	Notes
1990	Selamat Pagi Malaysia (Good Morning Malaysia)	Presenter	
2009	Future Perfect (pilot)	Sarah	Vertigo Heights, TS Ukpo
2010	Hacket Hill (pilot)	Spittlelick	Drowning Bee Productions, Dominic St Clair
2012	Coronation Street	Moira Bayley	ITV Granada, David Kester. Episode 8029.
2017	Chewing Gum	Penelope	E4, Michaela Coel. Series 2, Episode 3: 'I Just Need Some Company'.
2018	Collateral	Jill Leong	BBC2 / Netflix, George S. J. Faber and The Forge. Episode 3.
2018	Fortitude	Shen	Sky Atlantic / Amazon, Tiger Aspect Productions / Fifty Fathoms. Season 3.
2019	Chimerica	Shen	Channel 4, Playground Entertainment, written by Lucy Kirkwood, produced by Colin Callender, Sophie Gardiner, Adrian Sturges.
2020	Cobra	Air traffic controller (episodes 1.1 and 1.6)	Sky One, written by Ben Richards, directed by Hans Herbots.
2021–2023	Hollyoaks	Honour Chen-Williams	Channel 4 / E4 (Lime Pictures), produced by Lucy Allan.
2026	Emmerdale	Summer - private detective (season 55 episode 11)	ITV, written by Bill Taylor, directed by Jeff Naylor.

=== Radio ===
Year	Title	Role	Notes
2014	Dostoevsky and the Chickens	Nieu	BBC Radio 3, Emma Harding
2014	Brief Lives	Anh	BBC Radio 4, Tom Fry / Sharon Kelly
2014	Rhinoceros in Love	Mingming	BBC Radio 3, Emma Harding
2017	Inspector Chen	Detective Hong	BBC Radio 4, Joy Wilkinson

=== Theatre ===
Year	Title	Role	Notes
2000	The Winter's Tale (by William Shakespeare)	Time	Toured Japan with OUDS
2007	When the Lights Went Out	Samina	Tara Arts UK Tour, Vik Sivalingam
2008	Jingo by Charles Wood	Shirley	Finborough Theatre, Primavera Productions
2009	Sir Gawain and the Green Knight, adapted from the translation by Simon Armitage	Guinevere / The Green Lady	New Perspectives (UK tour), Daniel Buckroyd
2010	Mansfield Park and Ride	Fanny Fitztightly/Lucy Bonnet	Eastern Angles, Ivan Cutting
2010	Uncle Vanya (by Anton Chekhov)	Yelena	Sturdy Beggars, Vik Sivalingam
2010	The Death of Tintagel	Ygraine	saltpeter, Vik Sivalingam
2011	Talking in Bed	Nadia	Theatre503, Cecily Boys
2011	The Fever		Brighton Fringe, saltpeter, Gary Merry
2011	The Firework-Maker's Daughter (theatre adaptation)	Lila	Theatre by the Lake, Stefan Escreet
2012	Upstairs (rehearsed reading)	Noi	Finborough Theatre, Steve Keyworth
2013	Chimerica (by Lucy Kirkwood)	Mary Chang/Michelle	Almeida Theatre, Harold Pinter Theatre, Sonia Friedman Productions, Lyndsey Turner
2013	The World of Extreme Happiness	Xiao Li / Ming - Ming / Qing Shu Min	National Theatre, Michael Longhurst
2014	Twelfth Night (by William Shakespeare)	Maria	Open Air Theatre, Regent's Park, Max Webster
2015	The Hard Problem (by Tom Stoppard)	Bo	National Theatre, Nicholas Hytner
2015	The Winter's Tale (by William Shakespeare)	Dorcas	Garrick Theatre, Kenneth Branagh
2015	Harlequinade (by Terence Rattigan)	Miss Fishlock	Garrick Theatre, Kenneth Branagh
2018	The Outsider (L’Étranger) (adapted by Ben Okri)	Marie	Print Room at the Coronet, Abbey Wright
2019	The Paper Man, Improbable (artistic director Lee Simpson), directed by Tanuja Amarasuriya.	Co-creator and actor	Soho Theatre
2020	Alice - A virtual theme park, directed by Zoe Seaton.	The Red Queen	Creation Theatre Company
2021	Rice!, directed by Hester Welch and Razif Hashim.	Writer	Omnibus Theatre, Clapham, London (online), Felicity Paterson
2023–2024	2:22 A Ghost Story, directed by Matthew Dunster.	Lauren	UK Tour, Runaway Entertainment
2026	Heartwood, directed by Jack Lowe.	Ava	Curious Directive, Norwich
