= Teechers =

Play written by John Godber

Teechers is a play by John Godber, written in 1987. It was first performed by the Hull Truck Theatre Company at the 1987 Edinburgh Festival starring Martin Barass as Salty, Gill Tompkins as Gail and Shirley Anne Selby as Hobby. In 2010 a revival of the play was again performed at Hull Truck Theatre, before touring at other venues. The cast included Zoe Lister as Gail, Peter McMillan as Salty, and Claire Eden as Hobby. The play was updated with modern references and modern music.

It is a play within a play in which three students performed for their teachers. Everything in the play is reduced to the bare essentials, with very little set and the three actors playing twenty other parts. The students perform to an audience an account of their time in secondary school (given the name 'Whitewall High School' for their performance), specifically their time with Mr. Jeff Nixon, the new drama teacher who ignites their passion for the stage with his idealism and belief that all children should be treated equally. The children mention that the names of the characters have been changed: Mr. Nixon's real name is Mr. Harrison, mentioned at the beginning. At the end of the play, he leaves Whitewall High School to teach at St George's, another school that is regarded more highly. Once the three kids know that Nixon is leaving, they start to understand how much he helped them. Salty, in particular, wants to carry on with drama once he has left school. The play is originally set in East Yorkshire, however, the play never specifically states a location and Whitewall is meant to represent the average secondary school in the United Kingdom, with the show changing its cultural cues and references (such as a reference to Jimmy Savile, which has been removed) over the forty years it has been performed. In 2022, the play was modernised to Teechers Leavers '22.

An updated version, Teechers Leavers '26, toured the UK in 2026.

== Characters ==
- Lilian Hobson “Hobby” – The one in the trio fed up with her friends.
- Gail Saunders – The bossy and sassy within the trio. Also very attractive and enthusiastic.
- Ian Salt “Salty” – The fired soul, doesn't know what he'll do with his life after leaving school. Salty is a laid-back person with an attitude of a classic teenager with a common habit of over exaggerating. He's slightly dirty in appearance.
- Mr. Harrison – the drama teacher, socialist and idealistic, called Mr. Nixon in the play, to "Protect the names of the innocent", young and casual.
- Mrs. Hudson – the headmistress, called Mrs. Parry in the play, loud and large with a terrible dress sense.
- Bobby Moxon – (Oggy Moxon) Bully of the school who scares teachers and students alike.
- Ms. Whitham – Hopeless English teacher, eager to leave
- Mr. Basford – The deputy head and maths teacher. Hates children, typically nasty.
- Miss Jackie Prime – The sports teacher, young and bouncy.
- Doug – The caretaker. Grouchy and assertive.
- Mr. Dean – A teacher who thinks that all of the kids love him.
