= Ky Discala =

British actress

- Born: Kylie Hutchinson
- Education: Italia Conti Academy
- Occupation: Actress
- Years active: 2009–present
- Works: Hollyoaks (2021–2022)
- Height: 5 ft 7 in (170 cm)

Kylie Hutchinson also known as Ky Discala is a British actress who is best known for her portrayal on the Channel 4 soap opera Hollyoaks as Maya Harkwell (2021–2022).

== Life and career ==
Ky Discala is from Shropshire, England. Discala trained at Italia Conti Academy at 16 years old. In 2009 after Discala graduated from her acting school she was cast as a Maid in the Film Sherlock Holmes which was her first acting role. In 2009, Discala also was cast in a short film called Flak as a girl on a bus. In 2013, Discala portrayed the role of Alex in the film Everyone's Going to Die. In 2016, Discala was cast as Mila in a short film called Cold Blood. In 2018, Discala portrayed the role of DC Sarah Keita in the series called Next of Kin. In 2019, Discala portrayed the role of Sophia in Strike Back in one episode. In 2019, Discala was also cast in Hold the Sunset as Stephanie Walsh in 1 episode. In 2020, Discala was cast as Eagale in Alex Rider and she appeared in 3 episodes.

In 2021, it was announced that Discala would be joining the Channel 4 soap opera Hollyoaks as Maya Harkwell in the show's winter trailer. Discala spoke out on her character saying that it's been "great" to play the soap's "new female villain". "She's ruthless," Ky added. Discala also teased "Unfortunately for Darren, he was her next victim, which not only sees him but the whole village on their toes..." Her storylines during her stint on the soap involved kidnapping Darren Osborne (Ashley Taylor Dawson)and stalking Ethan's step niece Serena Chen-Williams (Emma Lau). In January 2022, Maya was killed-off after a scuffle with her boyfriend Ethan Williams (Matthew James-Bailey).

== Filmography ==
| Year | Title | Role | Notes | Ref. |
|---|---|---|---|---|
| 2009 | Sherlock Holmes | Maid | Film | |
| 2009 | Flak | Girl on bus | Short film | |
| 2012 | Payback Season | Jolana | Film | |
| 2013 | Everyone's Going to Die | Alex | Film | |
| 2016 | Cold Blood | Mila | Short film | |
| 2018 | Next of Kin | DC Sarah Keita | Series | |
| 2019 | Strike Back | Sophia | Guest role (1 episode) | |
| 2019 | Hold the Sunset | Stephanie Walsh | Guest role (1 episode) | |
| 2020 | Alex Rider | Eagle | Guest role (3 episodes) | |
| 2021–2022 | Hollyoaks | Maya Harkwell | Recurring role (15 episodes) | |
