= Frank Kauer =

British-Chinese actor (born 2000)

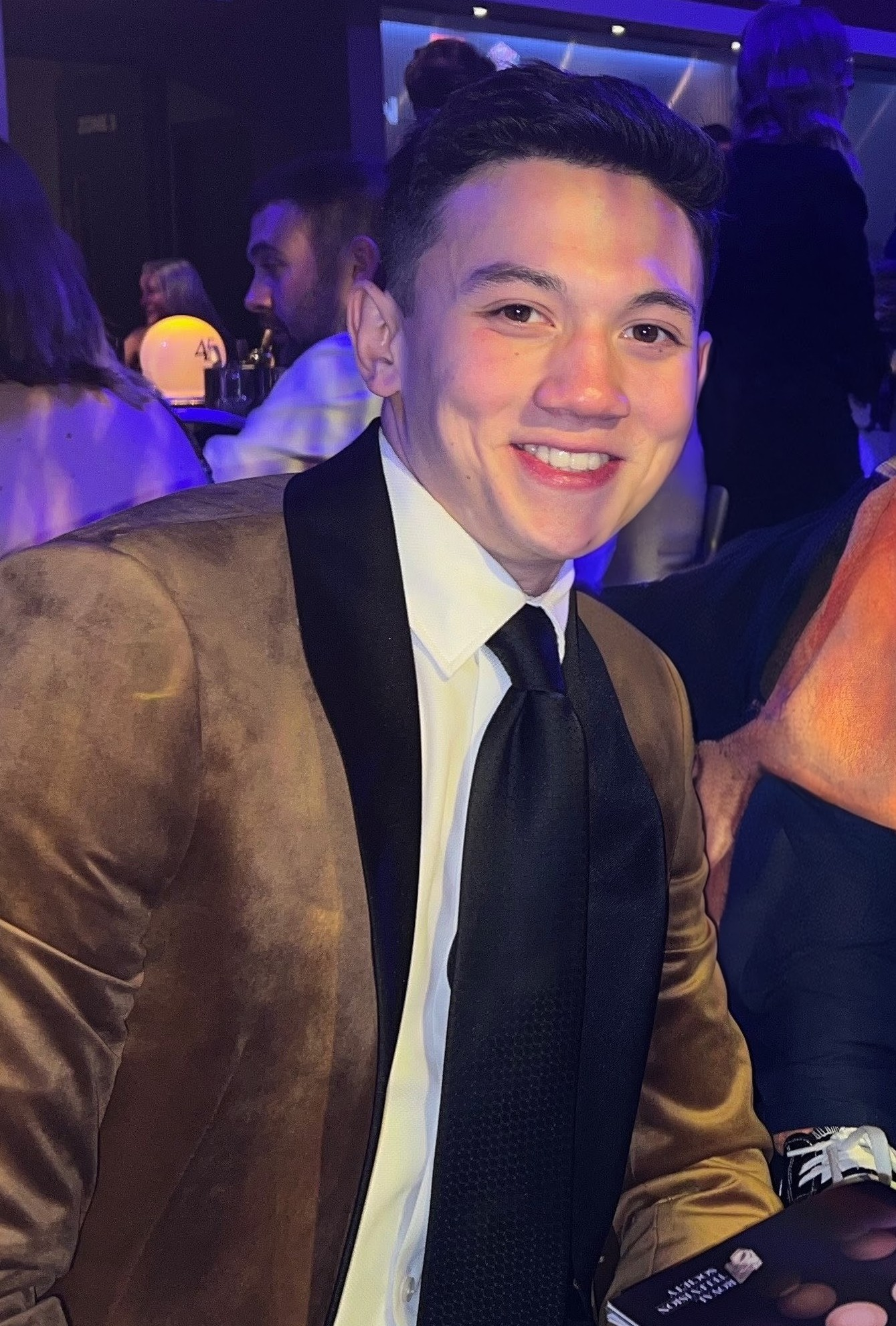
- Kauer in 2022
- Born: 2000 (age 26)
- Education: University of Bristol
- Occupation: Actor
- Years active: 2011–present
- Television: Hollyoaks

Frank Kauer (born 2000) is a British-Chinese actor. He made his professional acting debut in the 2011 movie Horrid Henry: The Movie and also had roles in the television series Spy (2012), Doctor Foster (2017) and Into the Badlands (2018). He played leading roles in the short films A Cry For Sore Eyes (2017) and Molly (2026) and also appeared in a stage production of Curse of Cranholme Abbey at the 2018 Edinburgh Festival Fringe. From 2021 to 2024, he played the role of Mason Chen-Williams on the British soap opera Hollyoaks.

== Early and personal life ==
Frank Kauer was born in 2000; he is British and Chinese. He obtained a BA in Film and Television from University of Bristol. He lives in London. He likes playing football and practising martial arts, and he has trained in Wing Chun since the age of 15, which he said he hopes to bring into his acting career. He also enjoys martial arts movies.

== Career ==
Kauer has worked in a professional capacity since he was 10 years old. He portrayed Spotless Sam in the 2011 film Horrid Henry: The Movie, marking his professional acting debut. He described being on the red carpet for the first time in his life as being "such a mad experience". He played Nick Chin in the second series of the British sitcom Spy, which aired in 2012. He also portrayed Max in the British psychological thriller television series Doctor Foster and had a guest role in the third season of the American action drama television Into the Badlands. Working with Suranne Jones in Doctor Foster encouraged him to pursue an acting career. He also had a main role in the short film A Cry For Sore Eyes (2017), which his school friend directed. At the 2018 Edinburgh Festival Fringe, he had a role in the stage adaptation of Curse of Cranholme Abbey.

"Working on a soap has brought very different challenges and experiences compared to other film and TV productions. It's exciting being able to focus on and study my character over a long period of time and watch his journey evolve. I've been able to dive deep into the world of Hollyoaks through having a real say in how to perform certain lines, scenes, and storylines, and working on short and long-term dynamics with on-screen family members."

— Kauer on his Hollyoaks experience (2022)

In 2021, Kauer joined the cast of the British soap opera Hollyoaks as 15-year-old Mason Chen-Williams, the youngest member of the new Chen-Williams family unit introduced to the soap opera that year. His first appearance aired in December 2021. The family was longlisted for "Best Family" in the 2022 Inside Soap Awards, but they did not make the shortlist. Being Eurasian himself, Kauer related to Mason because he experienced "the challenges growing up mixed race brought". His first few months on set were impacted by restrictions due to the COVID-19 pandemic in the United Kingdom, including 2 m (6 ft) social distancing. One of the character's storylines saw Mason manipulated and drawn into radical misogyny and incel culture, which Kauer did research for. The plot was nominated for "Best Storyline" at the 2023 Inside Soap Awards. Kauer and his colleagues Nikki Sanderson and Angus Castle-Doughty won an award at the 2023 British Soap Awards due to "Incel Eric Targets Mason and Maxine" winning "Best Storyline" there. Daniel Kilkelly from Digital Spy believed that Mason's radical misogyny storyline was a highlight for the Chen-Williams family.

Despite not often checking social media, Kauer noted that viewers had mixed reactions to his character, with some believing him to be a victim. He added that he and the cast of his onscreen family were very close and that he had even gone on a weekend trip to Mallorca with some of them in 2022. Most of Kauer's colleagues who were portraying other teenagers in the soap opera were younger than him, other than Ellie Henry, who was the same age as him. Kauer would practise Wing Chun with his co-star Dominic Power between scenes. Kauer made his final appearance on Hollyoaks in the episode airing on 8 May 2024, with his departure being one of many that year due to a reduction in cast and crew of the soap because of the soap reducing its number of weekly episodes.

Kauer played Ryan, a leading role, in the LGBTQ+ short film Molly, which was written and directed by Darius Shu. It premiered at the Roze Filmdagen LGBTQ+ film festival in the Netherlands in March 2026 before being screened at the Queer East festival in May 2026.

== Credits ==
=== Filmography ===
Year	Title	Role	Notes	Ref.
2011	Horrid Henry: The Movie	Spotless Sam	Feature film	
2012	Spy	Nick Chin	Series 2	
2017	Doctor Foster	Max	Series 2	
2017	A Cry For Sore Eyes	Nathan	Short film	
2018	Into the Badlands	Young Sonny	Guest role	
2021–24	Hollyoaks	Mason Chen-Williams	Regular role	
2026	Molly	Ryan	Short film	

=== Theatre credits ===
Year	Production	Venue	Ref.
2018	Curse of Cranholme Abbey	Edinburgh Festival Fringe	
