= Emma Lau =

British actress

- Lau in 2020
- Education: Mountview Academy of Theatre Arts
- Years active: 2014–present

Emma Chung Yi Lau is a British actress. On television, she is known for her role in the Channel 4 soap opera Hollyoaks (2021–2023). Her films include The School for Good and Evil (2022).

== Early life ==
Lau grew up in Greater Manchester. She took a foundation course at the Academy of Live and Recorded Arts (ALRA) before going on to graduate from the Mountview Academy of Theatre Arts.

== Career ==
Lau began her career working with the Yellow Earth Theatre Company on The Last Days of Limehouse in 2014 and O Deptford in 2016. Also in 2016, Lau made her television debut as Lucy in "Zero", an episode and installment of the BBC One drama anthology Moving On. This was followed by her feature film debut in Trial and Error.

In 2018, Lau appeared in Foreign Goods 3 at the Arcola Theatre and Table at the New Vic. She played Drusilla in the original cast of the stage musical adaptation of The Worst Witch, which premiered at the Royal & Derngate in Northampton, went on tour, and had a run at London's Vaudeville Theatre, marking Lau's West End debut. In 2020, she was cast in the Storyhouse productions of The Suicide, Miss Julie, and Signal Fires. She had small roles in the films Artemis Fowl in 2020 and Venom: Let There Be Carnage in 2021.

Lau made what was initially meant to be a guest appearance in the Channel 4 soap opera Hollyoaks in September 2021 before officially joining the main cast as Serena Chen-Williams in November 2021. She exited the soap in January 2023. She also played Kiko in the 2022 Netflix film The School for Good and Evil and Miranda in The Tempest at the 2023 Salisbury International Arts Festival. She starred in Glacier at the Old Fire Station in Oxford.

In 2024, Lau had a recurring role as Amelia in the Paramount+ series The Agency. She played Beth Cope in the 2025 thriller film Past Life with Aneurin Barnard.

In October 2026, Lau appeared in Eastenders as Jess Fang, the girlfriend to Lee Carter.

== Personal life ==
Lau is in a relationship with MMA fighter and fitness trainer Daniel Crooks-May.

== Filmography ==
=== Film ===
Year	Title	Role	Notes
2017	Trial and Error	Willow	
2020	Artemis Fowl	Goblin	Disney+ film
2021	Venom: Let There Be Carnage	Reveler	
2022	The School for Good and Evil	Kiko	Netflix film
2025	Past Life	Beth Cope	

=== Television ===
Year	Title	Role	Notes
2016	Moving On	Lucy	Episode: "Zero"
2021	Lagging	Presenter	Episode: "The Ticket"
2021–2023	Hollyoaks	Serena Chen-Williams	76 episodes
2024	The Agency	Amelia	4 episodes
2026	EastEnders	Jess Fang	2 episodes

=== Video games ===
Year	Title	Role	Notes
2022	Sifu	Fighter	
2022	Total War: Warhammer III		

== Stage ==
Year	Title	Role	Notes
2014	The Last Days of Limehouse	Jenny Tzeto	Yellow Earth Theatre / Limehouse Town Hall, London
2016	O Deptford	Thuy	Yellow Earth Theatre / Albany Theatre
2018	Foreign Goods 3	Leah	Arcola Theatre, London
2018	Table	Su-Lin / Aisha / Jess	New Vic, London
2018–2019	The Worst Witch	Drusilla	Royal & Derngate, Northampton / UK tour / Vaudeville Theatre, London
2020	The Suicide	Florence / Seren	Storyhouse, Chester
2020	Miss Julie	Christine	Storyhouse, Chester
2020	Signal Fires	Helen	New Earth Theatre
2023	The Tempest	Miranda	Salisbury International Arts Festival
2023	Glacier		Old Fire Station, Oxford
