= Matthew James-Bailey =

English actor (born 1995)

- Born: 13 April 1995 (age 31); London, England
- Occupation: Actor
- Years active: 2015–present
- Television: Hollyoaks (2021–2024); EastEnders (2026)

Matthew James-Bailey (born 13 April 1995) is an English actor. He is most known for portraying the role of Ethan Williams in the Channel 4 soap opera Hollyoaks (2021–2024). He played the role of DC Craig Ingram in the BBC soap EastEnders in 2026, departing the show in the episode broadcast 5 November.

== Life and career ==
Matthew James-Bailey was born on 13 April 1995 London, England. In 2015, James-Bailey was cast as Tomasz in the series Cucumber which was James-Bailey's first role. In 2016, James-Bailey portrayed the role of Nico in Soy Luna in one episode. In 2016, James-Bailey also appeared in one episode in the Channel 4 soap opera Hollyoaks as Jake who was a man who went on a date with John Paul McQueen (James Sutton).

In 2021, James-Bailey was cast as Ethan Williams in the Channel 4 soap opera Hollyoaks as the kidnapper of Darren Osborne (Ashley Taylor Dawson). James-Bailey spoke out on his character and said that his first scenes as Ethan was "incredibly fun" to film. He also said "I won't give too much away, but Ethan is here to shake things up and bring a new, albeit 'manic', energy to the village – unfortunately so for Darren," he teased. And he won't be the last to have the displeasure of meeting Ethan... Ethan's definitely coming in with a bang." His storylines during his time on the show have involved kidnapping Darren, accidentally murdering his girlfriend Maya Harkwell (Ky Discala), relationships with Sienna Blake (Anna Passey) and Vicky Grant (Anya Lawrence), reconciling his relationship with Sienna and getting married. In 2022, James-Bailey was shortlisted for "Best Newcomer" for his portrayal of Ethan, but he lost out to Heather Peace who plays Eve Unwin in EastEnders. In 2023, James-Bailey was shortlisted for "Best Partnership" shared with Anna Passey who plays Sienna, but they lost out to Dominic Brunt and Mark Charnock who portrays Paddy Kirk and Marlon Dingle in Emmerdale.

In 2024, James-Bailey announced that he had been axed from Hollyoaks due to the show moving to a three-week-episode schedule in September. In October 2024, Ethan was killed off on his wedding day to Sienna, as he fell from a balcony after an explosive row with Sienna. James-Bailey spoke out on his departure and described it as "bittersweet". James-Bailey said "It's come to an end a lot sooner than I would have liked. In previous interviews, I've said that I'd happily stay at Hollyoaks forever. It wasn't my choice to leave, but that's just the way that the game works, unfortunately! It's hard to say goodbye to the fans and all of the people there that I love. But you have to look at it as new beginnings, take the bull by the reins, get back on and do it."

In July 2026, it was announced that James-Bailey had joined the cast of EastEnders as DC Craig Ingram. Speaking about this, James-Bailey said: "Joining EastEnders has been a dream come true. From it being the soundtrack to my childhood, always on in the background at home, to gathering around the TV with my family every Christmas, being able to play even a small part in such an iconic piece of British television is truly surreal." The character first appeared in Episode 7367, broadcast on 20 July 2026.

== Filmography ==
=== Television ===
Year	Title	Role	Notes	Ref.
2015	Cucumber	Tomazs	TV series	
2016	Hollyoaks	Jake	Guest role (1 episode)	
2016	Soy Luna	Nico	Guest role (1 episode)	
2021–2024	Hollyoaks	Ethan Williams	Regular role	
2026	EastEnders	DC Craig Ingram	Regular role	

=== Web ===
Year	Title	Role	Notes
2026	Make Me A Match	Jeremy	Vertical drama

== Awards and nominations ==
Year	Ceremony	Category	Work	Result	Ref.
2022	Inside Soap Awards	Best newcomer	Hollyoaks	Nominated	
2023	Inside Soap Awards	Best partnership	Hollyoaks	Nominated	
