= Angus Castle-Doughty =

English actor (born 1995)

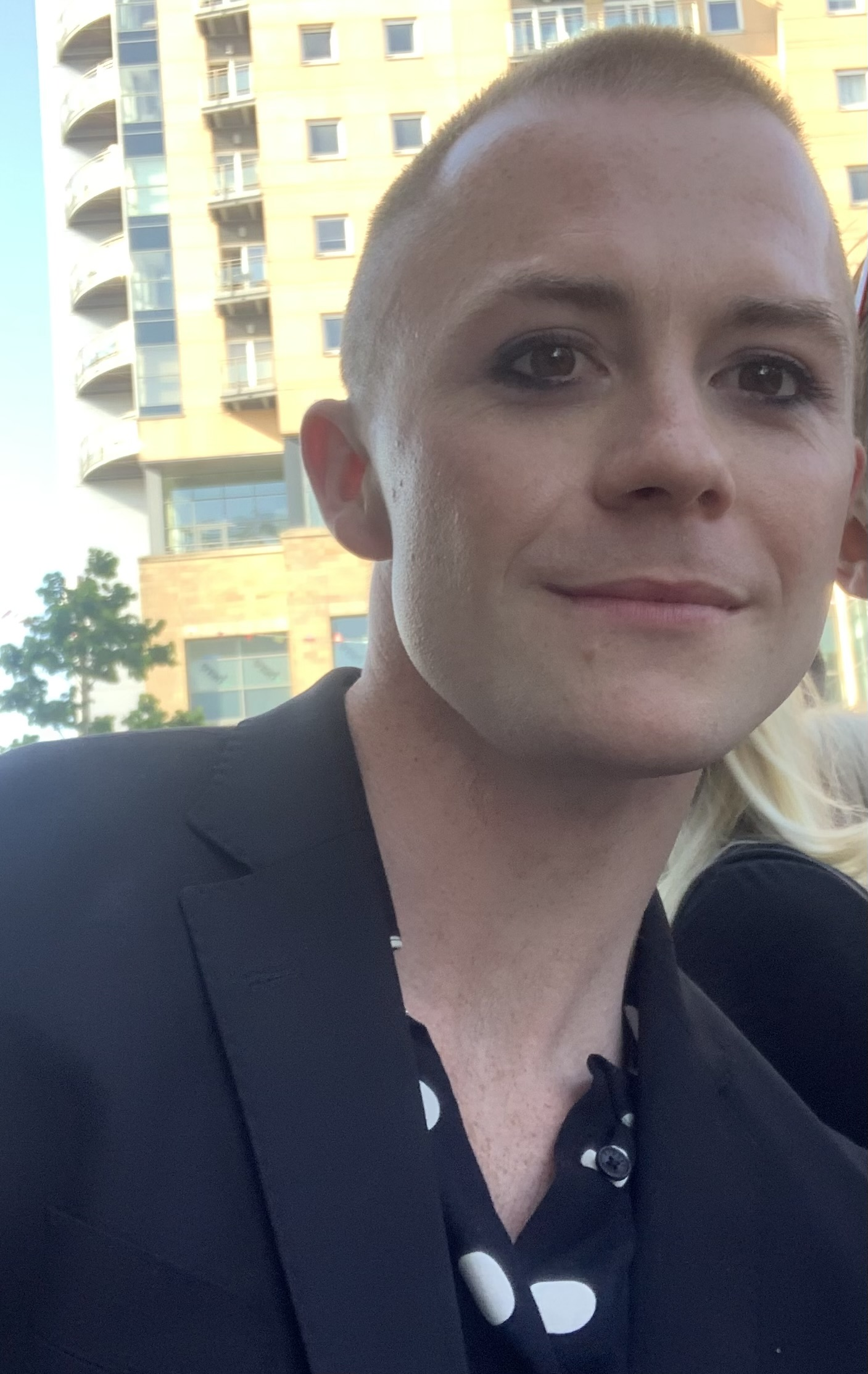
- Castle-Doughty in 2023
- Born: Angus Finlay George Castle-Doughty; 12 February 1995 (age 31); Dulwich, South London, England
- Education: Dulwich College; University of Warwick
- Occupation: Actor
- Years active: 2011–present
- Television: Showtrial; Hollyoaks
- Partner: Niamh Blackshaw (2022–present)

Angus Finlay George Castle-Doughty (born 12 February 1995) is an English actor. He began his career on stage in productions such as Teechers, The Government Inspector, The Picture of Dorian Gray and All Quiet on the Western Front, before joining the cast of the BBC legal drama Showtrial (2021). He subsequently played Eric Foster in the Channel 4 soap opera Hollyoaks (2022–2023). His character led a high-profile incel storyline, which earned the Best Storyline accolade at the 2023 British Soap Awards, as well as earning him a Villain of the Year nomination.

== Early and personal life ==
Angus Finlay George Castle-Doughty was born on 12 February 1995. Castle-Doughty studied English, Theatre and History at Dulwich College in South London, graduating in 2013 with three As. He then began studying English and Theatre Studies at the University of Warwick and graduated in 2017 with first class honours degrees.

Castle-Doughty co-founded the Incognito Theatre company alongside four others. He works as the artistic director, as well as appearing, writing and directing various projects for the company. Castle-Doughty has been in a relationship with actress Niamh Blackshaw since 2022.

== Career ==
Castle-Doughty made his acting debut in 2011 in a stage production of Teechers at the Edinburgh Festival Theatre. Three years later, he made his screen debut in the 2014 television film The First Great Escape. Castle-Doughty continued to act in theatre productions, including lead roles in The Government Inspector, The Picture of Dorian Gray, The Net Kill and All Quiet on the Western Front. Then in 2020, he appeared in an episode of the Acorn TV series Agatha Raisin. A year later, he portrayed the recurring role of Mikhael in the Netflix fantasy series Shadow and Bone. Also in 2021, he starred in the BBC courtroom drama series Showtrial as Troy Manners. He then featured in two episodes of the Sky comedy series Bloods.

In 2022, Castle-Doughty was cast as Eric Foster in the Channel 4 soap opera Hollyoaks. His character was introduced as the brother of established characters Tony (Nick Pickard) and Verity Hutchinson (Eva O'Hara). His character led a high-profile incel storyline that earned Castle-Doughty award nominations at the British Soap Awards and the Inside Soap Awards. It also saw Hollyoks win the Best Storyline accolade at the 2023 British Soap Awards.

== Filmography ==
Year	Title	Role	Notes
2014	The First Great Escape		Television film
2019	Forgive Me	Martin	Short film
2020	Agatha Raisin	Perry Peterson	Episode: "The Deadly Dance"
2021	Shadow and Bone	Mikhael	Recurring role
2021	Showtrial	Troy Manners	Main role
2021	The King's Man	British Soldier	Film
2022	The Sandman	Devin	Episode: "The Doll's House"
2022	Bloods	Mark	Recurring role
2022	Two's a Crowd	Finlay Knight	Short film; also writer and co-director
2022–2023	Hollyoaks	Eric Foster	Regular role
2025	A Thousand Blows	Morten Frewen	1 episode
2025	Robin Hood	Friar Tuck	

== Stage ==
Year	Title	Role	Venue
2011	Teechers	Doug	Edinburgh Festival Theatre
2013	Rites: A Children's Tragedy	Headmaster Bone Breaker	Edinburgh Festival Theatre
2015	The Government Inspector	Dobcinsky	Pleasance Theatre
2015	The Duchess of Malfi	Bosola	University of Warwick
2016	The Picture of Dorian Gray	Basil Hallward	Pleasance Theatre, Edinburgh Festival Theatre
2016	Cabaret	Ernst Ludwig	Warwick Arts Centre
2017	All Quiet on the Western Front	Kat	Pleasance Theatre
2017	Jerusalem	Jonny "Rooster" Byron	Warwick Arts Centre

== Awards and nominations ==
Year	Award	Category	Nominated work	Result	Ref.
2023	British Soap Awards	Villain of the Year	Hollyoaks	Nominated	
2023	Inside Soap Awards	Best Villain	Hollyoaks	Nominated	
