= Dominic Power =

English actor (born 1973)

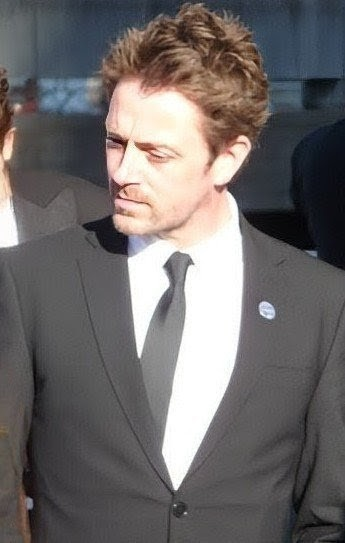
- Power in 2009
- Born: 5 May 1973 (age 53); Kent, England
- Education: Anna Scher Theatre
- Occupation: Actor
- Years active: 1997-present

Dominic Power (born 5 May 1973) is an English actor. Power has portrayed Leon Taylor in the ITV police drama The Bill (2008–2010), Cameron Murray in the ITV soap opera Emmerdale (2011–2013), and Dave Chen-Williams in the Channel 4 soap opera Hollyoaks (2021–2024).

== Television ==
Power was given his first major television role in 2008, appearing as PC Leon Taylor in the ITV police drama The Bill, having previously appeared in a guest role. He began appearing on screen from June 2008. Leon was one of only three uniformed police officers to stay with the show until its final episode of the 26th series, which was aired on 31 August 2010.

A year after The Bill ended, he was cast in the ITV soap opera Emmerdale as Cameron Murray. His character in Emmerdale was responsible for the murders of three major characters - Carl King (Tom Lister), Alex Moss (Kurtis Stacey) and Gennie Sharma (Sian Reese-Williams). The character died after being electrocuted within the flood that occurred in the pub's cellar. For his role, in 2013, Power won the Best Bad Boy award at the Inside Soap Awards.

In August 2014, Power appeared in the opening episodes of the second series of the Channel 5 crime drama Suspects, playing murder suspect Saul Hammond, a paranoid schizophrenic. Katy Brent of the Daily Mirror said: "The standout performance is from Dominic Power – last seen as crazy-eyed, gun-toting Cameron Murray in Emmerdale. Dominic gives a stellar performance as Saul's mental state disintegrates, leaving him confused and questioning his own innocence." It was announced in April 2015 that he had joined the cast of the ITV drama Unforgotten. Two years later, he appeared in the BBC soap opera Doctors, in the recurring role of DI Tom Stanton. In December 2021, he joined the cast of the Channel 4 soap opera Hollyoaks as Dave Chen-Williams. He left the soap in 2024 after his fictional family unit was axed.

== Filmography ==
Year	Title	Role	Notes
1997	EastEnders	Courier	1 episode
1998	The Bill	Carl White	Episode: "Time Gentleman Please"
1999	The Murder of Stephen Lawrence	David Norris	Film role
1999	Maisie Raine	Young Skinhead	Episode: "Can't See For Looking"
2000	Grange Hill	Simon Watson	Recurring role
2000	EastEnders	Peter	1 episode
2002	Casualty	Lawrence	Episode: "Some Comfort, No Joy and a Bit Too Much Love"
2002	Doctors	Peter Knowles	Episode: "Reasons to Be Fearful"
2004	The Courtroom	Gerry Rooney	Episode: "No Less a Life"
2008–2010	The Bill	PC Leon Taylor	Main role
2011–2013	Emmerdale	Cameron Murray	Regular role
2012	Tezz	Jo Jo	Film role
2012	The Impossible	Tourist	Film role
2014	Suspects	Saul Hammond	Episodes: "Nobody Else, Part 1" and "Nobody Else, Part 2"
2015	Unforgotten	Les Slater	Main role
2016	Doctors	Steve Price	Episode: "Eidolon"
2017	Doctors	DI Tom Stanton	Recurring role
2018	Moving On	Michael	Episode: "Lost"
2018	Incoming	Hemmings	Film role
2018	Casualty	Andy Storridge	1 episode
2021–2024	Hollyoaks	Dave Chen-Williams	Regular role

== Awards and nominations ==
Year	Ceremony	Category	Nominated work	Result	Ref.
2012	Inside Soap Awards	Best Actor	Emmerdale	Nominated	
2013	18th National Television Awards	Serial Drama Performance	Emmerdale	Nominated	
2013	British Soap Awards	Sexiest Male	Emmerdale	Nominated	
2013	British Soap Awards	Villain of the Year	Emmerdale	Shortlisted	
2013	British Soap Awards	Best On-Screen Partnership (with Lucy Pargeter)	Emmerdale	Nominated	
2013	Inside Soap Awards	Best Actor	Emmerdale	Nominated	
2013	Inside Soap Awards	Best Bad Boy	Emmerdale	Won	
2013	Digital Spy Reader Awards	Best Soap Actor	Emmerdale	Fifth	
2014	19th National Television Awards	Serial Drama Performance	Emmerdale	Nominated	
2014	British Soap Awards	Best Actor	Emmerdale	Nominated	
2014	British Soap Awards	Villain of the Year	Emmerdale	Shortlisted	
