= List of Hollyoaks characters introduced in 2025 =

Hollyoaks is a British soap opera that first aired on 23 October 1995. The following characters made their debut in 2025. Zachary and Leighton, the oldest sons of Stacey Solomon, appeared in cameos in January. Tommy Odenkirk, played by Brandon Fellows, made his first appearance on 11 March. Fraser "Froggy" Black Sr, played by John Middleton, debuted in August. Gemma Johnson, played by Tisha Merry, made her first appearance in October. Additionally, several other characters appear throughout the year.

== Parcel Patrons worker and Leighton ==
The Parcel Patrons worker and Leighton briefly appeared on 23 January. They were played by Zachary and Leighton, the oldest children of Stacey Solomon. The pair were not credited in the episode, but they appeared in some photos with some regular Hollyoaks cast members on the official Hollyoaks Instagram account. Solomon later revealed that when she and Zach – who she described as being "obsessed" with the soap – met the executive producer of Hollyoaks at the National Television Awards, who invited Zach to see the set at a later date. Zach and his brother later visited the set and were offered to be extras in the scene, which they accepted despite not having an interest in becoming actors. Solomon added that whilst they were "nervous" to be extras, her sons "loved every second of it and the people at Hollyoaks were just so lovely and so kind and so nice to us and they just had the best day ever". In the episode, the Parcel Patrons worker gets a telling her off from Pearl Anderson (Dawn Hope) after he delivers a fruit package late to her convenience store, Price Slice; she then also tells off Leighton for delivering her paper late, calling him "Late Leighton" and threatening that she will be speaking to his mother. Following the guest appearance, viewers questioned on social media whether the cameos were portrayed by Solomon's sons and whether they would appear again.

== Tommy Odenkirk ==
Tommy Odenkirk
- Hollyoaks character
- Portrayed by: Brandon Fellows
- First appearance: Episode 6537; 11 March 2025
- Last appearance: Episode 6568; 21 May 2025
- Introduced by: Hannah Cheers
In-universe information
- Occupation: Therapist

Tommy Odenkirk, played by Brandon Fellows, made his first appearance on 11 March 2025. He is introduced as the therapist of Leela Dexter (Kirsty-Leigh Porter), who was raped the previous year. It was hinted that Tommy would have other patients in the village and that he "might not be who he says he is" and may be hiding a secret. Fellows was excited to join the soap, calling Tommy a "friendly and unique therapist with a dark side and a complicated family history. I'm looking forward to the fans seeing this character's secrets unravel..." Following the character's announcement, Stephen Patterson from Metro wrote "Consider us very intrigued!" regarding Tommy's secret.

On 17 March 2025, it was revealed that Tommy has been lying about his identity to get closer to Leela's husband, Joel Dexter (Rory Douglas-Speed). Fellows, who plays Tommy, spoke about his character's double life: "Tommy's pretending to be somebody else. He does his therapy – and he shouldn't be doing that – but also he has another job and he works in a chicken shop on the side. He doesn't have many friends, he's very lonely and he has this completely different alter ego. It's been so much fun to play these two personas at the same time, it's been amazing." As part of a flashback episode that is due to explore the events that occurred before the Hollyoaks time jump, scenes will explain Tommy's obsession with Joel. Fellows explained: "This will be explored in the flashback episode about the missing year, we venture back in time because of Tommy and this storyline. All will be revealed about why this obsession started, and it's really interesting. I will say, Tommy's obsession with Joel is completely platonic. He doesn't lust for him; he sees him as a brother, and this will all make sense after the missing year episode."

Tommy was killed off, it was later revealed Jez killed him and framed Joel.

== Nina Bentley ==
Nina Bentley, portrayed by former Casualty star Mattie Packer, made her first voice appearance on 5 May 2025. She is a friend of Ro Hutchinson (Ava Webster), who he met on an LGBTQ+ forum where he sought solace after being subjected to transphobic abuse from Arlo Fielding (Dan Hough). Packer's casting was announced on the same day she made her first voice appearance and made her first on-screen appearance on 12 May 2025 in a special episode focusing on Ro's mental health, where Ro, along with his mother, Diane Hutchinson (Alex Fletcher) attends a support group. Her role was revealed to be a guest role. During the episode that Nina appeared, Hollyoaks changed the background to include the transgender flag colours in the ad break.

== Matt Domino ==
Matt Domino, portrayed by Oliver Wickham, first appeared on 12 May 2025. His casting was announced on 5 May 2025 and his character would be a guest. Matt attends the support group that Ro Hutchinson (Ava Webster) is also attending with his mother, Diane Hutchinson (Alex Fletcher). He first appears in an episode focusing on Ro's mental health after being subjected to transphobic abuse from Arlo Fielding (Dan Hough). During this episode, Hollyoaks changed the background to include the transgender flag colours in the ad break.

== Eve ==
Eve, portrayed by Trans actor Emma Frankland, is a volunteer at the LGBTQ+ helpline that Ro Hutchinson (Ava Webster) calls after his friend Kathleen-Angel McQueen (Kiara Mellor) encourages him to seek help after contemplating suicide. Her casting was announced on 5 May 2025 and she made her first appearance on 12 May 2025. Frankland appeared in episodes airing between 12 and 18 May 2025, which is Mental Health Awareness Week as well as being the episodes' scriptwriter. Frankland also appeared in a video interview set to be shared across the Hollyoaks social media accounts, where she will discuss the inspirations and collaborations of the storyline. Frankland told Digital Spy: "Having spoken to Samaritans, Papyrus and LGBT Switchboard, the crossover of what everybody said was so similar. They are volunteers mostly; they're giving up their time to be there because we know the power that a conversation has to change someone's path and to alter the route that they're on." She continued: "I'm really happy we're showing Ro in this truthful recognisable place and we're showing that there is an alternative and there is hope. Having met with real volunteers, I felt strongly that I wanted to play that part, and I think it was exciting having three guest roles in this episode, all of whom were trans."

== Froggy Black ==
Froggy Black
- Hollyoaks character
- Portrayed by: John Middleton
- Duration: 2025–2026
- First appearance: 4 August 2025
- Last appearance: 6 April 2026
- Introduced by: Hannah Cheers
- Crossover appearances: Brookside (2025)
In-universe information
- Sons: Fraser Black; Connor "Sully" Sullivan
- Grandsons: Rex Gallagher
- Granddaughters: Grace Black; Clare Devine; Dee Dee Hutchinson
- Other relatives: Rex Gallagher; Curtis Royle; Tori Devine-Banks (adoptive)

Fraser "Froggy" Black Sr, portrayed by John Middleton, is the father of notorious deceased gangster, Fraser Black (Jesse Birdsall), and the grandfather of Clare Devine (Gemma Bissix), Grace Black (Tamara Wall), and Rex Gallagher (Jonny Labey). He is due to appear after being released from Longmere Prison, where he is seen as "Top Dog", where he has befriended Tom Cunningham (Ellis Hollins) and keeping tabs on Rex. Middleton's casting was announced on 13 July 2025. Elizabeth Cotton from Manchester Evening News described Froggy's character as having a "dark past." Amelia Ward from the Daily Mirror described Froggy's character to be a "far cry" from Middleton's previous role as vicar Ashley Thomas in ITV soap opera Emmerdale. His first meeting with Clare is described as "explosive" with a "real battle" set to "ensue".. On 26 February 2026 it was announced that Middleton had quit his role as Froggy and would depart later in the year.

Middleton spoke about his new casting: "From Vicar to villain is quite a leap but that's why I love this part. Froggy has a very dark history and he could reveal everyone's murky past. He knows where all the bodies are buried; perhaps quite literally..." A source reported to The Mirror: "People usually think of Ashley when they see John but that won't be happening any more, Fraser is about as far away to the kindly vicar you can get." A Hollyoaks insider told them: "He's possibly the most evil character Hollyoaks has ever had - and for a village plagued by serial killers, that's saying something. Fraser will make his entrance very soon, and he's got more than one connection to the village with his twisted family already there."

Froggy was revealed to be the reason that Brookside character Mick Johnson (Louis Emerick) had to fake his death and change his identity to "Donny Clark". This reveal would lead to a crossover episode between Hollyoaks and Brookside during the shows 30th anniversary in October 2025.

== Gemma Johnson ==
Gemma Johnson, played by Tisha Merry, made her debut appearance on 13 October 2025 before starring in a one-off episode of Hollyoaks Later to coincide with the shows 30th Anniversary Celebrations, airing on 22 October 2025. Her casting was announced on 28 July 2025 and her character would have links to Warren Fox (Jamie Lomas), who has been confirmed to be returning to Hollyoaks permanently. Gemma was previously portrayed by Naomi Kamanga from 1990 until 1998 and Carla Jarrett from 1998 until 2000, in Brookside.

Merry expressed her excitement about joining the cast: "I'm absolutely over the moon to be joining the cast of Hollyoaks. It's a fabulous opportunity and an incredible time to join as they celebrate their 30th birthday week." She also discussed her character's personality, explaining, "Gemma is flirty, feisty, and the kind of woman you'd want as your best friend… but never your enemy. She's bold, unpredictable, and trust me when I say, she'll be entering with a bang. I can't wait for you all to meet her.".

== Sheila Grant ==
Sheila Corkhill (also Grant) is a character in Channel 4 soap opera Brookside who appeared between 1982 and 1990. She is played by Sue Johnston and is set to appear in a crossover episode of Hollyoaks with Brookside in celebrations of the former's 30th anniversary. Her appearance was announced on 23 August 2025. After receiving the news, Johnston said: "It'll be so lovely to go back and be Sheila for a day as it was such a big, enjoyable part of my life." Johnston was the first of a few Brookside stars to appear in the episode for "iconic, heritage Brookside characters as a treat for the audience and to mark the milestone of Hollyoaks' 30th anniversary." In this episode, special permission has been granted for Hollyoaks to film on Brookside Close, the Liverpool cul-de-sac which was the focal point of all the drama for 21 years. Previously used exclusively for soap filming until Brookside ended in 2003, it's now home to real-life residents who live in the famous houses.

== Tim O'Leary ==
Tim "Tinhead" O'Leary, portrayed by Philip Olivier, is a character in Channel 4 soap opera Brookside who appeared between 1996 and 2003. He is set to appear in the Hollyoaks crossover episode with Brookside, which is to celebrate the former's 30th anniversary. His appearance was announced on 2 September 2025, the same day as former co-star, Suzanne Collins, who would reprise her role as Nikki Shadwick. O'Leary spoke about his return: "When I was first cast in Brookside aged 15, I would never have thought that 30 years on, people would still be calling me 'Tinhead'! I remember my time on Brookside with great affection and will relish returning to 'the Close'."

== Nikki Shadwick ==
Nikki Shadwick, portrayed by Suzanne Collins, is a character in Channel 4 soap opera Brookside who appeared between 1998 and 2003. She is set to appear in the Hollyoaks crossover episode with Brookside, which is to celebrate the former's 30th anniversary. Her appearance was announced on 2 September 2025, the same day as her former co-star, Philip Olivier who would reprise his role as Tim O'Leary. Shadwick spoke about her return: "I'm honoured and privileged to be part of this special episode and to play Nikki again. I feel like I'm going home. It will be emotional without our darling Dean Sullivan [who played Brookie's longest-serving character, Jimmy Corkhill, and passed away in 2023], but I think he will be looking down on us and beaming with pride."

== Bobby Grant ==
Bobby Grant, portrayed by Ricky Tomlinson, is a character in Channel 4 soap opera Brookside who appeared between 1982 and 1988. He is set to appear in the Hollyoaks crossover episode with Brookside, which is to celebrate the former's 30th anniversary. His appearance was announced on 4 September 2025, the same day as former co-star, Michael Starke, who played Sinbad. Tomlinson spoke about his upcoming appearance: "It will be lovely to take part in Brookside again, especially to work alongside Sue Johnston. I'm looking forward to being on the close again after all these years." The announcement regarding Tomlinson's appearance followed his former on-screen wife, Sheila Grant, played by Sue Johnston who also played his on-screen wife in BBC comedy The Royle Family, and his former on-screen stepson Barry Grant, played by Paul Usher.

== Billy Corkhill ==
Billy Corkhill, portrayed by John McArdle, is a character in Channel 4 soap opera Brookside who appeared between 1985 and 1990. He is set to appear in the Hollyoaks crossover episode with Brookside, which is to celebrate the former's 30th anniversary. McArdle was announced to be reprising his role as Billy Corkhill on 28 August 2025, the same day as former co-star, Paul Usher who would reprise his role of Barry Grant for the crossover. McArdle spoke about his return: "It's going to be a nostalgic visit back to the famous close. Also I've got to try and find the character of Billy Corkhill again as I haven't played him for 35 years!" Their announcements followed Sue Johnston's return as his on-screen wife, Sheila Grant.

== Barry Grant ==
Barry Grant, portrayed by Paul Usher, is a character in Channel 4 soap opera Brookside who appeared between 1982 and 1995 and again from 1997 and 1998 and 2003. He is set to appear in the Hollyoaks crossover episode with Brookside, which is to celebrate the former's 30th anniversary. Usher's return as Barry Grant was announced on 28 August 2025, the same day as former co-star, John McArdle who would also be reprising his role as Billy Corkhill. Usher said he would be "looking forward to seeing all of the old faces". Their announcements followed Sue Johnston's return as his on-screen mother, Sheila Grant. Executive producer Hannah Cheers described the crossover episode to be a "love letter" to both soaps and said: "Brookside gave birth to Hollyoaks — it grew up on the same site and eventually took over its sets. This special feels like both a moving and fitting tribute to our origin story and a chance for fans to revisit much-loved Brookside characters in honour of that legacy. These iconic Brookside characters are soap archetypes that helped define British TV."

== Esme Dixon ==
Esme Dixon
- Hollyoaks character
- Portrayed by: Yasmin Davies
- Appears on: 22 October 2025 (Brookside crossover episode); 22 October 2025 (Hollyoaks Later)
- Introduced by: Hannah Cheers
- Spin-off appearances: Hollyoaks Later (2025); Brookside (2025)
In-universe information
- Mother: Jacqui Dixon
- Half-brothers: Harry Farnham
- Grandfathers: Ron Dixon
- Grandmothers: DD Dixon
- Uncles: Mike Dixon; Tony Dixon
- Aunts: Megan Brindley
- First cousins: Josh Dixon; Michael Dixon; Beth Dixon

Esme Dixon, portrayed by Yasmin Davies, appeared in the Brookside crossover characters in celebration of the 30th anniversary of Hollyoaks as well as the special Hollyoaks Later episode. Davies' casting was announced on 14 October 2025 and Laura Denby from Radio Times described her to be a "party girl". Esme is the daughter of former Brookside character, Jacqui Dixon, who was portrayed by her real-life mother, Alex Fletcher who has played Hollyoaks regular character Diane Hutchinson since 2010.

Davies' character is set to have some fun with some of the other teenagers, including Frankie Osborne (Isabelle Smith). It has also been confirmed that Davies has been filming with returning Brookside actors Sue Johnston and John McArdle, who play Sheila and Billy Corkhill respectively. Davies spoke about her role: "I've absolutely loved being a part of the Brookside and Laters episodes. There has been such a nostalgic energy on set, and I’m really looking forward to seeing it all come together to celebrate 30 years of Hollyoaks."

== Connor "Sully" Sullivan ==
Connor "Sully" Sullivan
- Hollyoaks character
- Portrayed by: Harry French
- Duration: 2025–2026
- First appearance: 22 October 2025
- Last appearance: 1 April 2026
- Introduced by: Hannah Cheers
- Spin-off appearances: Hollyoaks Later (2025)
- Crossover appearances: Brookside (2025)
In-universe information
- Occupation: Gangster; Undercover Police Officer
- Father: Froggy Black
- Half-brothers: Fraser Black
- Nephews: Rex Gallagher
- Nieces: Grace Black; Clare Devine; Dee Dee Hutchinson
- Other relatives: Rex Gallagher; Curtis Royle; Tori Devine-Banks (adoptive)

Connor "Sully" Sullivan, portrayed by Harry French was one of two gangsters who appear in the Brookside crossover episode and the Hollyoaks Later 30th anniversary special episode, which both aired on 22 October 2025. Their arrivals were announced on 13 October 2025 and a Hollyoaks insider told Digital Spy that "there are some other newcomers that should be feared…" Johnathon Hughes from Digital Spy described: "Gangsters Sully and Griff are about to wheedle their way into the community, posing a terrifying threat as they drag some of Hollyoaks' most beloved characters into a dangerous world". On 28 October, Sully made an unannounced return at the end of the episode, where it was revealed that he was the son of Froggy Black (John Middleton) and was working for him.

In the 30th anniversary edition of Hollyoaks Later, Griff physically attacked Dodger Savage (Danny Mac) and raped him as part of a criminal intimidation tactic. Hollyoaks is working alongside We Are Survivors to portray the storyline sensitively and accurately. The pair initially target Warren Fox (Jamie Lomas), but come after Mick Johnson (Louis Emerick) - also known as Donny Clark - and Dodger when they intervene. Sully attacks and rapes Donny whilst Griff does the same to Dodger.

Sully is revealed to be Froggy's son and an undercover police officer. Sully works for his family's criminal empire while pretending to be an upstanding citizen. Sully meets Frankie Osborne (Isabelle Smith) and is immediately smitten with her. When Frankie discloses her twins brother, JJ's (Ryan Mulvey), sexual abuse of her, Sully has JJ murdered in prison, but claims he only wanted to scare him.

== Griff Farnedge ==
Griff Farnedge, portrayed by Nathan Hubble was one of two gangsters who appear in the Brookside crossover episode and the Hollyoaks Later 30th anniversary special episode, which both aired on 22 October 2025. Their arrivals were announced on 13 October 2025 and a Hollyoaks insider told Digital Spy that "there are some other newcomers that should be feared…" Johnathon Hughes from Digital Spy described: "Gangsters Sully and Griff are about to wheedle their way into the community, posing a terrifying threat as they drag some of Hollyoaks' most beloved characters into a dangerous world".

In the 30th anniversary edition of Hollyoaks Later, Griff physically attacked Dodger Savage (Danny Mac) and raped him as part of a criminal intimidation tactic. Hollyoaks is working alongside We Are Survivors to portray the storyline sensitively and accurately. The pair initially target Warren Fox (Jamie Lomas), but come after Mick Johnson (Louis Emerick) - also known as Donny Clark - and Dodger when they intervene. Sully attacks and rapes Donny whilst Griff does the same to Dodger. CEO of We Are Survivors, Duncan Craig OBE spoke about the storyline: "I am so incredibly proud of what we have achieved with this new storyline, as proud as I am of all the stories we have told with Hollyoaks. It really is a long-term relationship which began with breaking new ground and continues today." He continued: "The team at Hollyoaks have always been so receptive to our input. From the writers to the directors, cast to producers, everyone has always been committed to not only tell the most realistic story we can, but understand the responsibility we have in how male survivors watching the show will feel. They also understand so well that we want survivors yet to break their silence feel less alone. Danny is an absolute joy to work with. The care and respect he has shown us at We Are Survivors, shown me as a survivor, and given to the story has resulted in an incredible and realistic portrayal of male victimhood and following survivorship. I know that viewers will feel so much for Dodger and survivors will want to stand by him in solidarity. Danny has given us that."

== Joseph McQueen ==
Joseph McQueen
- Hollyoaks character
- Portrayed by: Uncredited
- Duration: 2025–present
- First appearance: Episode 6,637; 29 October 2025
- Introduced by: Hannah Cheers
In-universe information
- Family: McQueen
- Father: Joel Dexter
- Mother: Cleo McQueen
- Half-brothers: Noah Dexter
- Half-sisters: Clara Dexter
- Grandfathers: Warren Fox
- Grandmothers: Marie Fielding; Reenie McQueen
- Uncles: Sebastian Blake
- Aunts: Porsche McQueen; Celine McQueen; Ella Richardson; Sophie Blake; Maria-Gabriella Fox-McQueen
- Other relatives: Mercedes McQueen; John Paul McQueen; Goldie McQueen; Prince McQueen; Hunter McQueen; Maria-Carmella McQueen

Joseph McQueen is the son of Joel Dexter (Rory Douglas-Speed) and Cleo McQueen (Nadine Mulkerrin) who was conceived after a one-night-stand. He first appeared on 29 October 2025 when he was born after Cleo went into early labour at 28 weeks pregnant and was rushed to hospital by Dodger Savage (Danny Mac). After she gave birth, Cleo suffered a haemorrhage and needed emergency medical attention. Due to being premature, Joseph needed to stay in the Neonatal Intensive Care Unit. On 30 October 2025, it was announced that Hollyoaks would work alongside the charity, Action on Postpartum Psychosis (APP) to portray a storyline focusing on Cleo suffering from Postpartum Psychosis (PP), which reports show affects 1,200 people a year. The storyline would see Cleo gain a support network in Dodger, his twin sister and Cleo's girlfriend, Sienna Blake (Anna Passey) and the rest of the remaining McQueen family. APP have consulted with the cast members involved and advised on the storytelling process.

Mulkerrin spoke about her role in the storyline: "It's been a new challenge taking on the role of motherhood and the difficulties that being a new mum can bring, especially the strain it can have on your mental health. We had a consultation with APP [Action on Postpartum Psychosis] whilst filming this storyline and it was helpful to hear other people's experiences - my heart breaks for poor Cleo." Dr Jess Heron, the CEO of Action on Postpartum Psychosis said: "Responsible portrayals of PP on popular TV shows such as Hollyoaks are invaluable." She continued: "With greater public awareness, partners, friends, family members and frontline health professionals will be more able to quickly spot the signs and seek specialist emergency help as soon as possible. We're grateful to Hollyoaks for playing a part in awareness raising and for their diligent approach to producing a sensitive and accurate storyline."

== Smithy ==
Smithy
- Hollyoaks character
- Portrayed by: Kurtis Stacey
- Duration: 2025–2026
- First appearance: 18 November 2025
- Last appearance: 18 February 2026
- Introduced by: Hannah Cheers
In-universe information
- Occupation: Police Officer

Smithy, played by Kurtis Stacey, made his first appearance on 18 November 2025. Smithy's role in Hollyoaks is a police officer working alongside Sully (Harry French). Writers quickly established him as a bent officer when he is blackmailed by Sully into letting him escape police custody. In 2026, it was revealed that Hollyoaks were developing Smithy into a more villainous role. He also became a potential love interest of John Paul McQueen (James Sutton). Smithy then uses Prince McQueen (Malique Thompson-Dwyer), who is arrested for dealing illegal steroids, to continue to run a drug dealing operation. Prince had only been purchasing steroids when he was arrested but is forced to accept Smithy's proposition to secure his freedom. Prince tries to warn John Paul about Smithy and his fears are confirmed when Smithy steals John Paul's keys to the school he works at. Smithy then gets Prince to set up a drug dealing base at the school.

Smithy is a police officer who works with Dodger Savage (Danny Mac), Donny Clark (Louis Emerick) and Sully (Harry French). Smithy begins to tease Dodger at work over his rape ordeal. He goes for drinks with Sully and Dodger, and is sexist towards Frankie Osborne (Isabelle Smith) in the pub. Smithy continues to humiliate Dodger at work but he later stands up to Smithy. Sully and Smithy later arrest Donny and a prostitute, Molly (Harriet James-Norbury) for attempting to have sex in exchange for money. Smithy attends a call out at the local high school to attend to student, Anthony Hutchinson's (Brook Debio) violent behaviour. Smithy threatens to arrest Anthony but John Paul tells Smithy he only wanted to scare Anthony. Smithy berates John Paul for wasting police time and his demeanour reminds John Paul of his abusive ex-boyfriend, George Kiss (Callum Kerr), who was also a police officer. Smithy goes to an alcoholics anonymous meeting and is surprised to see John Paul at the group. He later asks John Paul to keep his attendance a secret and he agrees.

== Other characters ==
Character	Portrayer(s)	Episode date(s)	Details	Ref(s)
DS Bolton	Sophie Mensah	7 January–25 August	A police officer who interviews Peri Lomax (Ruby O'Donnell) after she reports Abe Fielding (Tyler Conti) for raping her. DS Bolton continues appearing throughout the year whenever residents face legal troubles, and she develops an attraction to Sienna Blake (Anna Passey), handing her her number. Sienna calls DS Bolton when her father, Jeremy Blake (Jeremy Sheffield) prepares to confess to his murders, with Jeremy handing his diary over to DS Bolton. When Jeremy discovers that Sienna has no intention of keeping their relationship, he murders DS Bolton before she can report him.	
Prosecutor	Sophie Fletcher	13–15 January	The legal team at JJ Osborne's (Ryan Mulvey) trial following his sexual abuse against Frankie Osborne (Isabelle Smith). The legal team cross-examines JJ and Frankie and other people relevant to the trial. After JJ's confession, the judge sentences him for his crimes.	
JJ's Defence Barrister	Hopi Grace	13–15 January	The legal team at JJ Osborne's (Ryan Mulvey) trial following his sexual abuse against Frankie Osborne (Isabelle Smith). The legal team cross-examines JJ and Frankie and other people relevant to the trial. After JJ's confession, the judge sentences him for his crimes.	
Judge	Kerry Peers	13–15 January	The legal team at JJ Osborne's (Ryan Mulvey) trial following his sexual abuse against Frankie Osborne (Isabelle Smith). The legal team cross-examines JJ and Frankie and other people relevant to the trial. After JJ's confession, the judge sentences him for his crimes.	
Sonographer	Kate Threlfall	22 January	A sonographer who performs the scan of Vicky Grant (Anya Lawrence). She tells Vicky and her boyfriend Robbie Roscoe (Charlie Wernham) that the baby is healthy and has a strong heartbeat.	
Fernando (cat)	Uncredited	17–18 February	A stray cat that Ste Hay (Kieron Richardson) looks after and becomes close with. After he goes missing, Ste suspects that Jeremy Blake (Jeremy Sheffield) murdered him.	
Cooper	Chris Eastwood	4–19 March	Cooper is a man who attends a party thrown by Rex Gallagher (Jonny Labey). He pays Rex £200 in order to sleep with Dillon Ray (Nathaniel Dass), with Dillon unaware of the money changing hands. At a separate party, Dillon is shocked when Cooper tells him that he paid money for the pair to sleep together.	
Billy Odenkirk	Marcus Christophersen	2 April–20 May	Billy is the older brother of Tommy Odenkirk (Brandon Fellows), and is incredibly abusive towards his younger brother. During the time skip, Joel Dexter (Rory Douglas-Speed) witnesses Billy bullying Tommy and throws a punch, knocking Billy out and placing him in a coma. Tommy lied to Joel that while in a coma, Billy had died, but Peri Lomax (Ruby O'Donnell) later revealed that Billy had woken up from the coma.	
Keith	Brennan Reece	8 April	Keith is a man who pays to have sex with Dillon Ray (Nathaniel Dass), however, Dillon refuses to sleep with him. Their argument is witnessed by Frankie Osborne (Isabelle Smith) who punches Keith in response.	
Ray	Daniel Crossley	14 April–13 May	Ray is a man at a party thrown by Grace Black (Tamara Wall), where he is introduced to Frankie Osborne (Isabelle Smith), with Grace telling Frankie that Ray has connections to the ballet world. When Ray brings a friend around to sleep with Frankie, she slaps him across the face before locking herself in a bedroom. Frankie later invites Ray back around, faking an apology, before getting Ray to pass out and emptying his wallet.	
PC Guy	Tim Preston	23 April–9 June	PC Guy is a corrupt police officer working for DI Alistair Banks (Drew Cain). DI Banks orders PC Guy to stop Donny Clark (Louis Emerick) from investigating them, leading to the officer faking a callout for Donny to attend with him, however, before he can attack him, Donny tases him. PC Guy later sees DI Banks with Diane Hutchinson (Alex Fletcher), and mistaking her for Banks' wife, he hands her a duffel bag filled with money. When Robbie Roscoe (Charlie Wernham) prepares to give Donny a statement about what Grace Black (Tamara Wall) did to him, PC Guy arrives to scare Robbie into silence.	
Andy	John Delaney	26–28 May	A group of lackeys hired by DI Alistair Banks (Drew Cain) to keep his sex trafficking ring moving. When Darren Osborne (Ashley Taylor Dawson) attempts to rescue the teens held at Fernmere Hill, a fight erupts in which the group badly beat Darren. After tying up Darren, Robbie Roscoe (Charlie Wernham) and the teens, however, when they see Curtis Royle (Reuben Shepherd) they kidnap him, thinking he's involved in the ring.	
Colin	Kru Lundy	26–28 May	A group of lackeys hired by DI Alistair Banks (Drew Cain) to keep his sex trafficking ring moving. When Darren Osborne (Ashley Taylor Dawson) attempts to rescue the teens held at Fernmere Hill, a fight erupts in which the group badly beat Darren. After tying up Darren, Robbie Roscoe (Charlie Wernham) and the teens, however, when they see Curtis Royle (Reuben Shepherd) they kidnap him, thinking he's involved in the ring.	
Eddie	Gino Nicholson	26–28 May	A group of lackeys hired by DI Alistair Banks (Drew Cain) to keep his sex trafficking ring moving. When Darren Osborne (Ashley Taylor Dawson) attempts to rescue the teens held at Fernmere Hill, a fight erupts in which the group badly beat Darren. After tying up Darren, Robbie Roscoe (Charlie Wernham) and the teens, however, when they see Curtis Royle (Reuben Shepherd) they kidnap him, thinking he's involved in the ring.	
Neil	Andrew Purcell	26–28 May	A group of lackeys hired by DI Alistair Banks (Drew Cain) to keep his sex trafficking ring moving. When Darren Osborne (Ashley Taylor Dawson) attempts to rescue the teens held at Fernmere Hill, a fight erupts in which the group badly beat Darren. After tying up Darren, Robbie Roscoe (Charlie Wernham) and the teens, however, when they see Curtis Royle (Reuben Shepherd) they kidnap him, thinking he's involved in the ring.	
Ian Stone	Seán Carrington	23 June	Ian Stone is a social worker who arrives in the village after being called by Dodger Savage (Danny Mac), although when he arrives in the village, he's unaware that Bobby Costello (Zak Sutcliffe) has stowed away in his boot. Ian talks to Dodger about Dennis Savage's (Joe Tracini) fears before his death, but becomes unnerved when he sees Jeremy Blake (Jeremy Sheffield) watching them. As Ian attempts to leave the village, Jeremy confronts him in an alleyway and murders him.	
Honey	Chloe Anais Hunt	1–2 July	Honey is a girl who sleeps with Dillon Ray (Nathaniel Dass) with the pair getting high on drugs together. The pair are caught by Lucas Hay (Oscar Curtis), who throws Honey out.	
Dr Greaves	Chris Jack	7 July	Dr Greaves is a doctor confronted by Ste Hay (Kieron Richardson) who becomes concerned over Lucas Hay's (Oscar Curtis) behaviour. Although Dr Greaves confirms to Ste that Lucas's CT scans showed no issue, but advises Lucas to meet with a mental health professional, prompting Lucas to lose his temper.	
Waitress	Rhiannon Jones	14 July	A waitress at a roadside cafe that Clare Devine (Gemma Bissix) brings Bobby Costello (Zak Sutcliffe) and Jacob Omari (Ethaniel Davy) to. As Clare waits for a client to pick up Bobby and Jacob, Jacob convinces the waitress to call Frankie Osborne (Isabelle Smith) who arrives to rescue the pair, with the waitress blocking Clare from intervening.	
Undercover Police Officer	Nathan Jonathan	4 August	An undercover police officer stationed outside Grace Black (Tamara Wall) and Clare Devine's (Gemma Bissix) apartment listening in on their conversations. When Grace and Clare discover they've been compromised, they manage to escape while the undercover police officer joins a raid on their property.	
Janine	Elsie Bennett	6 August	Janine is a therapist visited by Grace Black (Tamara Wall) who attempts to bring back her memories about who the father of her first child is.	
Father Patrick	Dale Edwards	18–19 August	Father Patrick is a priest who oversees the funeral of Bobby Costello (Zak Sutcliffe).	
Annie	Charlie Young	3 September	Annie is a family liaison officer who meets with the Osborne family after Morgan Osborne (Lottie-Rose Mulhall) is kidnapped.	
Connor	Matt Concannon	17 September	Connor is a prisoner who works in the kitchen alongside Tony Hutchinson (Nick Pickard). Connor threatens Tony when Joel Dexter (Rory Douglas-Speed) confronts him over the death of Bobby Costello (Zak Sutcliffe). Connor is present when Joel later attacks Tony.	
Judge	Christine Mackie	30 September	A judge at the plea hearing of Tony Hutchinson (Nick Pickard) for the murder of Bobby Costello (Zak Sutcliffe). During the trial, it is revealed that Jeremy Blake (Jeremy Sheffield) killed Bobby and many other victims.	
Police Officer	Lewis Kilgour	1 October	A police officer who rides with Jeremy Blake (Jeremy Sheffield) in an ambulance after he is knocked unconscious by Mercedes McQueen (Jennifer Metcalfe). During the ride, Jeremy regains consciousness and he strangles the police officer to death.	
Celebrant	Paula Wolfenden	20 October	A celebrant who marries Tony Hutchinson (Nick Pickard) and Diane Hutchinson (Alex Fletcher).	
Phil Redmond	Himself	23 October	A man who takes a taxi from Brookside to Chester.	
DS Harris	Natasha Patel	29 October	A police officer who Dodger Savage (Danny Mac) arranges a meeting with in order to report being raped by Griff Farnedge (Nathan Hubble).	
Melanie Athill	Rebecca Root	29 October	A midwife who helps Cleo McQueen (Nadine Mulkerrin) deliver Joseph McQueen.	
Superintendent Singh	Narinder Samra	3 November 2025 –	A Superintendent working at Dee Valley Police station. He introduces to Dodger Savage (Danny Mac) and Donny Clark (Louis Emerick) to their new colleague, Connor "Sully" Sullivan (Harry French). Singh is annoyed with Donny and Dodger for messing up Sully's undercover operation. Dodger tells Singh he was raped by Sully's friend, Griff Farnedge (Nathan Hubble) but Singh tells Dodger to forget about it so they do not have to report the fumbled investigation into Griff. Singh continues to reprimand his staff when they continue to mess up. He later congratulates Donny for managing to arrest a gang of armed robbers, unaware that Sully helped and has managed to compromise Donny.	
Deborah Fernsby	Jackie Knowles	18 November	Deborah is a social worker who visits Ste Hay (Kieron Richardson) after he falsely admits to abusing Lucas Hay (Oscar Curtis). With Ste looking after his grandson, James Barnes, Deborah visits to remove James from his care due to the allegations of abuse.	
Physiotherapist	Matt Mainwaring	19 November	A physiotherapist who works with Tony Hutchinson (Nick Pickard) after he suffers from a stroke after being shot by Mercedes McQueen (Jennifer Metcalfe).	
Dr Phillips	Catherine Kinsella	9 December 2025–2 February 2026	A psychiatrist who treats Cleo McQueen (Nadine Mulkerrin) after she suffers from postpartum psychosis. Although Cleo recovers and is discharged, Dr Phillips recommends Cleo getting sectioned after she believes that she caused injuries to her son Joseph McQueen.	
Trina	Sadie Williams	15 December –	Trina is friends with Dee Dee Hutchinson (Chloe Atkinson) and meets her and her brother, Anthony Hutchinson (Brook Debio) for breakfast. At school, Trina asks Anthony out on a date. Trina is impressed with Anthony when she spots him boxing and Diane Hutchinson (Alex Fletcher) is happy when she thinks Trina is dating Anthony. She goes to Anthony's room and they kiss, but he pulls Trina's hair and she recoils from him. Anthony asks her if she likes him being rough and she leaves. Anthony chases after her calling her a slag. Trina later forgives Anthony and continues her friendship with Dee Dee, supporting her following her mother's death. Trina convinces Dee Dee to take drugs and they get high together. Trina attends the Hutchinson siblings birthday party and incorrectly presumes Dee Dee has romantic feelings for Kathleen-Angel McQueen (Naledi Rapotu). Trina kisses Dee Dee's ex-boyfriend, Maddox Keane (Sam Meyer) which causes an argument. Trina accuses Dee Dee of being in love with Kathleen-Angel in front of her family and friends, Dee Dee lashes out and causes a fire which sets Maddox's clothing on fire and leaves him with burns.	
Alan	Michael J Hill	15 December	A man who recognises Gemma Johnson (Tisha Merry) during a robbery, his hesitation allows Warren Fox (Jamie Lomas) to ambush him and steal his gun to getaway.	
Molly	Harriet James-Norbury	16 December –	Molly is a prostitute who Donny Clark (Louis Emerick) pays for to try and have sex with. Molly recognises Donny but he assures her he is off duty. His colleague, Connor "Sully" Sullivan (Harry French) arrives to arrest them both and Donny insists he has not set Molly up.	
