= Yasmin Davies =

British actress (born 2005)

- Born: 2005 (age 21)
- Education: Royal Academy of Dramatic Art
- Occupation: Actress
- Years active: 2023–
- Mother: Alex Fletcher

Yasmin Davies (born 2005) is a British actress. She is the daughter of actors Alex Fletcher and Neil Davies. She has had roles in the television series The Tower, Maryland and The Gathering. In 2025, she appeared in Hollyoaks and Hollyoaks Later as Esme Dixon, the daughter of Jacqui Dixon, who Davies' mother had portrayed on Brookside. Davies has also filmed roles for upcoming episodes of Silent Witness and G'wed.

== Early life ==
Yasmin Davies was born in 2005. She is the daughter of actress Alex Fletcher, who portrayed Jacqui Dixon in Brookside between 1990 and 2003 and Diane Hutchinson in Hollyoaks since 2010, and Fletcher's husband Neil Davies, who was also an actor. After Fletcher gave birth to Davies, she did not work for a few years. Davies' parents met whilst working on Brookside, with their daughter explaining, "I heard so much about Brookside when I was growing up... Brookside is a big part of my family and who I am". Davies has a younger brother who was born in June 2016. Davies credited her parents as being a big influence on her decision to pursue acting, explaining, "My mum never forced me into doing it; I think she kind of persuaded me to try and do something other than act at times, to be honest! I've always wanted to do it since I can remember and I've got a really good mentor at home".

== Career ==
Davies portrayed Molly in the television series Maryland, which aired in May 2023. Davies has also appeared in The Tower and The Gathering.

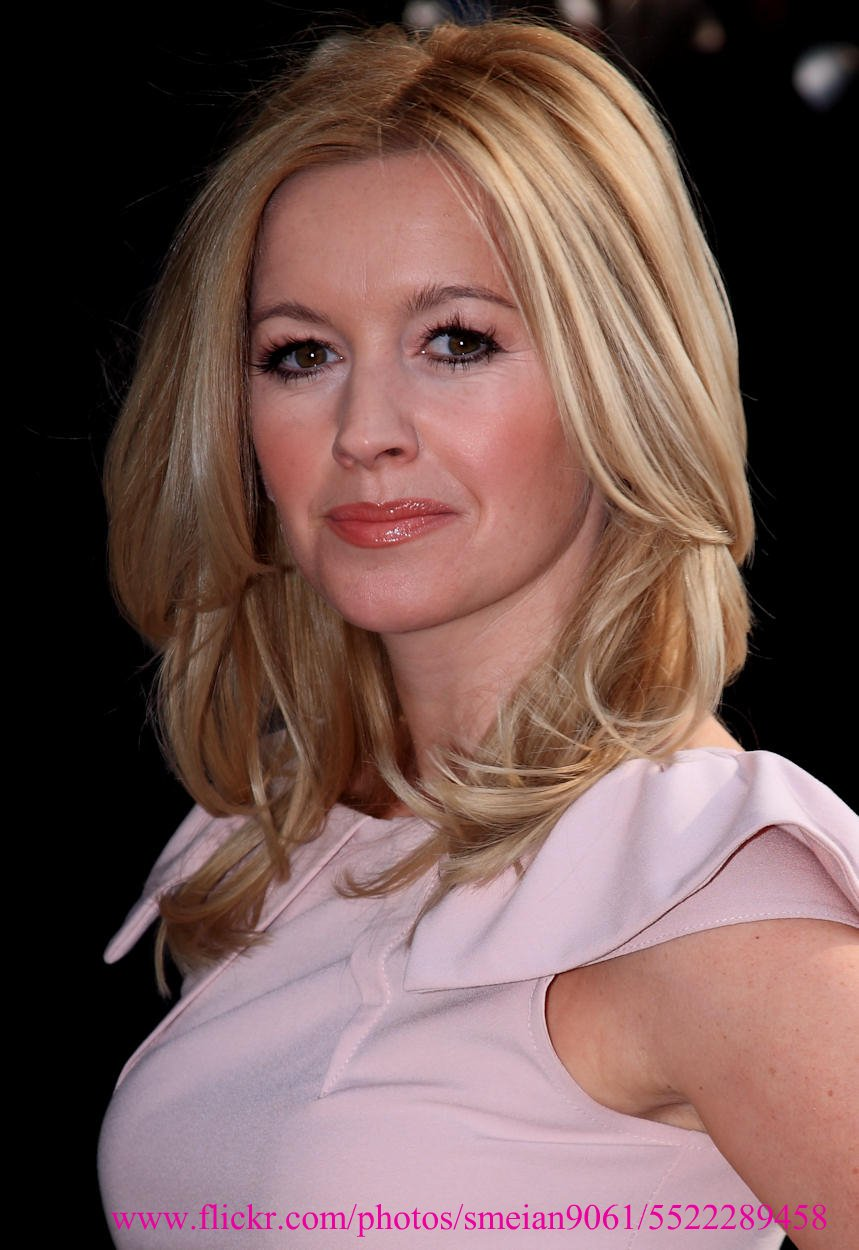
Yasmin's mother is actress Alex Fletcher (pictured)

In October 2025, it was announced that Davies would portray Esme Dixon, the daughter of Fletcher's Brookside character Jacqui Dixon, in the special one-off crossover episode between Brookside and Hollyoaks as part of the latter's 30th anniversary. For that episode, Davies filmed with John McArdle and Sue Johnston, who portrayed Billy Corkhill and Sheila Grant, respectively. It was also reported that she would also play the role in the late-night spinoff Hollyoaks Later, where it was teased that she would have an impact on and provide "escapism" for established character Frankie Osborne (Isabelle Smith). Both episodes aired on 22 October 2025. Davies "absolutely loved" being part of the episodes, adding, "There has been such a nostalgic energy on set, and I'm really looking forward to seeing it all come together to celebrate 30 years of Hollyoaks". Davies described Esme as confident, witty and slightly "mysterious". Davies believed that Esme had similar traits to her mother and said it was possible that the character could appear again on Hollyoaks despite there currently being no plans for it. Laura Denby from Radio Times called Davies' casting a "perfect twist" due to Esme being Jacqui's daughter. Discussing her first time on the Brookside set, Davies explained,

"It felt nostalgic for me, even though I’d never been before. The first time I went was with my mum the week before filming. It was really great; Mum was smiling from ear to ear. It was nice to see her be somewhere she dedicated so much of her life to and where her career started to take off. It felt really full circle. She took loads of pictures and was excited for me. I get to have a nod to her character in my scenes."

In October 2025, it was reported that Davies was about to begin a Bachelor of Arts course at Royal Academy of Dramatic Art. It was also reported that Davies was filming for the third season of the television sitcom G'wed. Davies is also set to appear in a two-part story in Silent Witness. Director Martin Smith praised Davies, saying, "Yasmin is such an exciting actor and a joy to have on set. I directed her in the upcoming series of Silent Witness in a challenging role that she embraced and shone in. A delight to work with, she is a real livewire and a talent to keep an eye out for. Not only a resourceful actor, she is a natural on the film set, and a real team player whose enthusiasm was infectious."

== Filmography ==
Year	Title	Role	Notes	Ref(s).
Unknown	The Tower	—N/a	Television series	
2023	Maryland	Molly	Television series	
2024	The Gathering	—N/a	Police procedural television show	
2025	Hollyoaks	Esme Dixon	Guest role (1 episode)	
2025	Hollyoaks Later	Esme Dixon	2025 special	
Unknown	G'wed	—N/a	Season 3; to be released	
Unknown	Silent Witness	—N/a	To be released	
