= Hollyoaks Later (Hollyoaks Later episode) =

- Hollyoaks Later episode
- Directed by: Neil J. Wilkinson
- Written by: Heather Robson
- Original air date: 6 January 2020
- Running time: 46 minutes

Episode chronology
← Previous "Series 6"	Next → —

"Hollyoaks Later" is a late night episode of the television series Hollyoaks Later, a spinoff of the Channel 4 soap opera Hollyoaks, which was aired on 6 January 2020.

It is the night of reckoning for Breda McQueen (Moya Brady) as all of her vicious deeds catch up with her in a final showdown at Stone Mount Farm, as well as the introduction of Tony Hutchinson's (Nick Pickard) sister Verity Hutchinson (Eva O'Hara).

== Plot ==
Breda McQueen's (Moya Brady) murderous past has finally caught up with her, after being found out by her family that she is a serial killer. She arrives at her pig farm to find Mercedes McQueen (Jennifer Metcalfe) trying to free Tony Hutchinson (Nick Pickard) from the pig pen, whom she has kept prisoner since August. Verity Hutchinson (Eva O'Hara) meets Diane Hutchinson (Alex Fletcher) for the first time after she and Sami Maalik (Rishi Nair) walked in on Diane kissing Edward Hutchinson (Joe McGann). Breda punches Mercedes and stabs Tony in the stomach with a pitchfork and locks them back up in the pig pen. Verity tells Diane that Edward always gets what he wants and claims she takes after him. Sylver McQueen (David Tag) and his sister Goldie McQueen (Chelsee Healey) argue over how dangerous Breda is, with Sylver being dismissive of Goldie's claims. Lisa Loveday (Rachel Adedeji) bursts in, still believing Mercedes is the serial killer after Breda tried to frame her, and asks them if she knew if Mercedes killed her father Louis Loveday (Karl Collins), and finds his ring in Liberty Savage's (Jessamy Stoddart) jumble shop. Mercedes finds out that Breda has harmed her brother, John Paul McQueen (James Sutton). Breda calls her a whore and says she will be the first "bad mum" that she is going to kill. Goldie finds two dolls in Liberty's shop window which match similar ones Breda gave to children after murdering their fathers, thus realising that Breda is the serial killer.

Nana McQueen (Diane Langton) and Grace Black (Tamara Wall) tell Martine Deveraux (Kéllé Bryan) and her father Walter Deveraux (Trevor A. Tossaint) that Mercedes has been released without charge. Lisa shows them Louis' ring and threatens to kill Mercedes. Walter decides to host a vigil in Mercedes' pub. Sylver and Goldie search Mercedes' flat for Breda, not noticing John Paul unconscious on the floor behind the sofa after Breda poisoned him. Sylver does not believe Goldie's claims that Breda is the serial killer and realise she's at the pig farm. Edward, Verity, Sami and Diane attend a fundraising night out at The Loft. Edward starts to act frosty with Diane. Mercedes tries braking the pig pen door down but it does not work. She comforts Tony whilst he tries to stop the bleeding from his stab wounds. Sami and Verity kiss in passionately and leave the night out. Breda packs her passport and a bible into her bags to go on the run with. Sylver and Goldie arrive to question Breda, where she confesses to her murders. At Walter's vigil, he talks about forgiveness; but Leela Lomax (Kirsty-Leigh Porter), Jesse Donovan (Luke Jerdy) and Liam Donovan (Jude Monk McGown) cannot forgive the serial killer. Breda relives the trauma of her childhood at the hands of her abusive father, confessing she killed him by shooting him in the head and fed him to the pigs and tells Sylver his biological father is buried in a field on the pig farm. The village pay tribute to the victims at Walter's vigil. Breda tells Goldie why she killed Russ Owen (Stuart Manning) was because he forced her to terminate her pregnancy. Sylver asks her if he really killed Goldie's father, but Breda says she did.

Diane confronts Edward about why he is ignoring her, claiming he is nobody's affair. Sylver starts to get angry after he was sentenced to 18 years imprisonment for a murder he did not commit, and tries to strangle Breda. Goldie intervenes and realises that Breda has harmed Mercedes. Breda picks up a gun and shoots Sylver in the stomach, before disappearing. Diane seduces Edward by walking into his office naked. Sami and Verity arrive back at his house and have sex on the sofa. Mercedes holds Tony in her arms but he suddenly falls unconscious, believing he has died. Breda suddenly reappears with a petrol can and starts pouring petrol around the pig farm. Goldie runs off to find Mercedes. Breda lights a match and throws into the petrol.

Diane tells Edward she's ready to leave Tony for him. Lisa and Martine sing "Amazing Grace" in remembrance to the victims. Goldie frees Mercedes and Tony from the pig pen. Breda lets the flames grow around her and Sylver, wanting him to die with her. Grace finds John Paul as he regains consciousness from when Breda poisoned him. The fire spreads quickly around the pig farm. Mercedes finds Sylver and Breda unconscious on the floor. Breda regains consciousness, telling Mercedes she will never come between him and her son again, but Mercedes punches her. Breda picks up a piece of broken glass and attempts to stab Mercedes, but they end up fighting. Goldie leaves Tony to find Mercedes. Sylver suddenly stands up and stabs Breda in the head with two knitting needles, killing her instantly. John Paul arrives with the police arrive at the pig farm. Mercedes and Goldie rescue Sylver just as the pig farm explodes.

== Cast ==
- Rachel Adedeji as Lisa Loveday
- Marie Borg as Felecité
- Moya Brady as Breda McQueen
- Kéllé Bryan as Martine Deveraux
- Ashley Taylor Dawson as Darren Osborne
- Alex Fletcher as Diane Hutchinson
- Jessica Fox as Nancy Osborne
- Chelsee Healey as Goldie McQueen
- Luke Jerdy as Jesse Donovan
- Diane Langton as Nana McQueen
- Joe McGann as Edward Hutchinson
- Jude Monk McGowan as Liam Donovan
- Jimmy McKenna as Jack Osborne
- Jennifer Metcalfe as Mercedes McQueen
- Rishi Nair as Sami Maalik
- Eva O'Hara as Verity Hutchinson
- Nick Pickard as Tony Hutchinson
- Kirsty-Leigh Porter as Leela Lomax
- Adam Rickitt as Kyle Kelly
- Jessamy Stoddart as Liberty Savage
- James Sutton as John Paul McQueen
- David Tag as Sylver McQueen
- Trevor A. Toussaint as Walter Deveraux
- Tamara Wall as Grace Black
- Stephanie Waring as Cindy Cunningham

== Production ==
On 20 September 2019, it was announced that Hollyoaks Later would be making a one-off return in January 2020, which will focus on the conclusion of Breda McQueen's (Brady) serial killer storyline. Joining Breda, characters such as Mercedes McQueen (Metcalfe), Sylver McQueen (Tag), and Diane Hutchinson (Fletcher) will be involved. Other likely characters to appear are Breda's daughter Goldie McQueen (Healey), and Breda's current pig farm hostage, Tony Hutchinson (Pickard). Tony's half-sister, Verity Hutchinson (O'Hara), will also be making her first appearance in the late-night episode. It has been promised that the special one-off edition will feature much "blood and gore" and "a lot of violence", with the episode revolving "around the McQueens a lot".

It was revealed on 5 November via Hollyoaks' social media that a huge fire will break out at Breda's pig farm, leaving several characters in danger. It was then confirmed that the episode will debut at 21:00 on E4, on 6 January 2020, with a repeat on Channel 4 the following evening at 23:00. The episode is written by Heather Robson and directed by Neil J. Wilkinson.

Several scenes teasing the episode where teased during Hollyoaks' three-minute-long winter which was released onto YouTube on 25 November 2019. More scenes were teased during the show's New Year trailer, which was released onto Facebook on 2 January 2020.
