= Ava Webster =

British actress (born 2009 or 2010)

- Born: Ava Lily Webster; 5 May 2010 (age 15)
- Occupation: Actress
- Years active: 2023–present
- Television: Hollyoaks

Ava Lily Webster (born 5 May 2010) is a British actress who portrayed Ro Hutchinson in the British soap opera Hollyoaks from 2023 to 2025. For her role as Ro, she has been nominated for two Inside Soap awards.

== Life and career ==
Ava Lily Webster was born on 5 May 2010. She is from Atherton, Greater Manchester. Webster is a pupil of Fred Longworth High School and has also attended "A Will and A Way", a drama school at Leigh, Greater Manchester, where she developed a "passion" for performing. She has appeared in various plays.

In October 2023, it was announced that Webster would be taking over the role of Ro Hutchinson (then known as "Rose") in the British soap opera Hollyoaks, replacing Isla Pritchard. The character been in Hollyoaks since 2013. Webster had auditioned for the soap but had not been aware of which role it was for. Webster's debut aired later that month in a storyline which saw Ro go missing on his 12th birthday. Alex Fletcher, who portrays Ro's mother Diane Hutchinson, explained that the recast would allow "a little bit more scope as to what we can do" and praised Webster, calling her a "gorgeous little actress", and also teased that Ro would be central to storylines. In 2024, a storyline began on the soap which involved Ro questioning their gender identity and coming out as a trans boy. Ro's transition was a long-running storyline which ran into 2025, and the character also faced transphobic bullying and was central to a special Mental Health Awareness Week episode reflecting the struggles of young transgender people; Hollyoaks worked with the charities LGBT Foundation and the Samaritans for the episode, which sees Ro call an LGBTQ+ emergency helpline when he almost takes his own life. The episode praised by viewers. Whilst on the soap, Webster sometimes had private tuition. For her role as Ro, Webster was longlisted for "Best Young Performer" at the 2024 Inside Soap Awards. She was longlisted for the same award the following year. She ended up reaching the viewer-voted shortlist. In October 2025, it was reported that Webster had left the soap and that the role had been recast to transgender actor Leo Cole.

== Filmography ==
Year	Title	Role	Notes	Ref(s).
2023–25	Hollyoaks	Ro Hutchinson	Regular role	

== Awards and nominations ==
List of acting awards and nominations
Year	Award	Category	Title	Result	Ref.
2024	Inside Soap Awards	Best Young Performer	Hollyoaks	Longlisted	
2025	Inside Soap Awards	Best Young Performer	Hollyoaks	Shortlisted	
