= Brandon Fellows =

British actor (born 1994 or 1995)

- Born: 1994 or 1995 (age 31–32)
- Occupation: Actor
- Years active: 2015–present
- Television: Raised by Wolves; The Stranger; Hollyoaks

Brandon Fellows (born 1994 or 1995) is a British actor. Having trained at the National Youth Theatre, Fellows later had roles in the British sitcom Raised by Wolves (2015–16), the mystery thriller miniseries The Stranger (2020) and the comedy thriller television series Dead Hot (2024). Between March and May 2025, Fellows portrayed Tommy Odenkirk in the British soap opera Hollyoaks, which resulted in Fellows being longlisted for "Best Newcomer" at the 2025 Inside Soap Awards. He has also had guest appearances in Doctors (2017), Upstart Crow (2018), Casualty (2021) and Beyond Paradise (2025), in addition to acting in theatre productions of The Skills Show and Pigeon English.

== Life and career ==
Brandon Fellows is English and was born in 1994 or 1995. He trained at the National Youth Theatre.

Fellows portrayed Callum in the first two series of the British sitcom Raised by Wolves, which aired in 2015 and 2016. He then appeared in two episodes (Parts 1 and 2 of "I Don't Do Animals") of the BBC soap opera Doctors, which were originally broadcast on 12 and 13 April 2017. He also guest-starred in a 2018 episode of the third series of the British sitcom Upstart Crow. He also portrayed Mike Tripp in the 2020 mystery thriller eight-part miniseries The Stranger. Megan Bull from Hello! praised Fellows's "brilliant performance", noting that the actor had "particularly impressed" viewers and became a "rising star with a loyal fanbase". Fellows also guest-starred in an episode of the 35th series of Casualty, which was initially broadcast on 17 July 2021. Fellows played the recurring role of Charlie in the 2024 comedy thriller television series Dead Hot. The following year, Fellows guest-starred as Kenny Pluckley in the third episode of the third series of Beyond Paradise, which was originally broadcast in April 2025. Additionally, Fellows has acted in theatre productions of The Skills Show and Pigeon English.

On 4 March 2025, it was announced that Fellows had joined the cast of Hollyoaks as new character Tommy Odenkirk, with his first appearance in the role occurring in the episode originally released on 11 March 2025. Tommy was introduced as the therapist of established character Leela Lomax (Kirsty-Leigh Porter), but spoilers for the character teased that Tommy may be lying about his identity. Fellows was excited to join the cast of Hollyoaks and was "looking forward to the fans seeing [Tommy's] secrets unravel". It was later revealed that Tommy was pretending to be a licensed therapist and had been attempting to get closer to Leela's husband, Joel Dexter (Rory Douglas-Speed). Fellows enjoyed working with the "veterans" of the soap, including Douglas-Speed, Porter and Jeremy Sheffield, saying that it had been "so much fun to play with actors who have so much experience". Fellows also praised the character, calling him "interesting", "quirky and unique", and believed that the audience would "love to hate" him; he also believed that the character debuted with "such a bang". Tommy was later killed off, and Fellow's final appearance in the role aired in the episode originally released on 21 May 2025, after Tommy was found murdered. For his role as Tommy, Fellows was longlisted for "Best Newcomer" at the 2025 Inside Soap Awards.

== Personal life ==
Fellows is good friends with actress Farrel Hegarty, who appeared in the soap opera Coronation Street; the pair used to live together, and a video of the pair going to a Pride event together received attention from soap opera fans. Fellows's favourite food is sushi and his favourite holiday destination is Ibiza. In 2020, Fellows said on social media that he had lost 4.5 stone (63 pounds; 29 kilograms) since filming on The Stranger.

== Acting credits ==
=== Filmography ===
Year	Title	Role	Notes	Ref(s).
2015–16	Raised by Wolves	Callum	Series 1 and 2	
2017	Doctors	Tim 'TC' Crouch	2 episodes ("I Don't Do Animals" - Parts 1 and 2)	
2018	Upstart Crow	Claude	1 episode ("Sigh No More")	
2020	The Stranger	Mike Tripp	Main cast	
2021	Casualty	Connor 'Con' Elsworth	1 episode (Series 35, episode 27)	
2024	Dead Hot	Charlie	Recurring role	
2025	Hollyoaks	Tommy Odenkirk	Recurring role	
2025	Beyond Paradise	Kenny Pluckley	1 episode (Series 3, episode 3)	

=== Theatre ===
Year	Production	Role	Company	Ref.
Unknown	Pigeon English	Dean	National Youth Theatre	
Unknown	The Skills Show	Pantalone	Fresh	

== Awards and nominations ==
List of acting awards and nominations
Year	Award	Category	Title	Result	Ref.
2025	Inside Soap Awards	Best Newcomer	Hollyoaks	Longlisted	
