= Maryland (TV series) =

British drama series

- Genre: Drama
- Created by: Suranne Jones; Anne-Marie O'Connor
- Directed by: Susan Tully
- Country of origin: United Kingdom
- Original language: English
- No. of episodes: 3

Production
- Running time: 46–50 minutes

Original release
- Network: ITVX (United Kingdom); PBS (United States)
- Release: 22 May 2023

Maryland (also called MaryLand) is a British television drama series. The series premiered on 22 May 2023, on ITV and the new streaming platform ITVX. The series aired in Australia on BritBox on 25 January 2024. The series aired on PBS in the US in May 2024.

== Synopsis ==
The series follows two estranged sisters who regain contact following the sudden death of their mother on the Isle of Man.

== Cast ==
- Suranne Jones as Becca
- Eve Best as Rosaline
- Hugh Quarshie as Pete
- George Costigan as Richard
- Dean Lennox Kelly as Jacob
- Andrew Knott as Jim
- Rhiannon Clements as Lauren
- Yasmin Davies as Molly
- Stockard Channing as Cathy
- Judy Clifton as Mary
- Ben Addis as DT Ian Quayle
- Steph Lacey as Solicitor
- Geraldine McAlinden as Mallory
- Ed White as Nick

== Development ==
The series was filmed in Ireland.

== Reception ==
Nick Hilton in The Independent called the series "a chill-inducing, moving portrait of sisterhood". Lucy Mangan in The Guardian gave the series 4 out of 5 stars.
