= The Stranger (Coben novel) =

2015 American mystery novel

- First edition (US)
- Author: Harlan Coben
- Language: English
- Genre: Mystery, thriller
- Published: 2015
- Publisher: E. P. Dutton (US); Orion Books (UK)
- Publication place: United States
- Media type: Print (hardback, paperback)
- Pages: 386 (Dutton hardcover)

The Stranger is the 14th stand-alone novel by American crime writer Harlan Coben. The novel was first published in March 2015.

The novel was made into a British television limited series of the same title that was released on Netflix in January 2020.

== Plot summary ==
The Stranger can appear anywhere and speak to anyone. While his identity and motives are unknown, his information is undeniably accurate. Adam Price, living the American dream with a beautiful wife, two sons, and a well-paying job, encounters The Stranger, who tells him a devastating secret about his wife, Corinne. But that is only the beginning of Adam's problems. Corinne explains that there is more to her deception than appears on the surface, and wants to meet Adam alone to discuss it. She never shows up for the meeting and seems to have disappeared. More secrets are discovered to have been revealed or leveraged by The Stranger, threatening to not only ruin lives, but end them.
