= Kurtis Stacey =

English actor

- Born: Liverpool, England
- Occupation: Actor
- Years active: 2009–present

Kurtis Stacey is an English actor. He gained professional training at college and began securing theatre roles and extra work in television series. From 2011 until 2012, he played the regular role of Alex Moss in the British soap opera, Emmerdale. He continued his stage career with the 2018 production of The Ruby Slippers, playing Ryan/Rachel and became a regular in the British pantomime scene. In 2024, Stacey took the role of Smithy in the soap opera, Hollyoaks.

== Career ==
Stacey was born and grew-up in the city of Liverpool in the suburb of Wavertree. Stacey is the cousin of the actress, Tina Malone. He studied performing arts at Hugh Baird College and gained triple distinctions in his national diploma. He credited his college giving him the lead role of Reverend John Hale in their production of The Crucible as helping him gain a good work ethic in the industry. He also attributed his early success to the support of his tutor, Nathan Marsh. While studying, Stacey signed with the theatrical agency The Narrow Road Company and gained extra work in Crimewatch and Waterloo Road. He also gained jobbing work in television commercials between roles.

In 2011, Stacey secured his first prominent television role, playing Alex Moss in the British soap opera, Emmerdale. Stacey described his character as "a regular lad with a 'work hard/play hard' attitude." Stacey recalled feeling "terrified" on his first day filming as Alex. Stacey left the series in 2012 after twenty months in the role. His character was killed-off in a murder storyline by serial killer, Cameron Murray (Dominic Power). Stacey claimed he was happy with his departure storyline and noted its grit was a reason he became an actor. Stacey appeared as a contestant in the 2012–2013 season of Celebrity Mastermind.

In 2018, Stacey played the role of Ryan/Rachel in the stage production of The Ruby Slippers. Stacey's character is a bartender who prepares their gender transition. In 2024, Stacey played a hotel manager character in the series, Sexy Beast. He later took on the role of police officer, Smithy in the soap opera, Hollyoaks and debuted during the episode broadcast on 18 November 2025.

Stacey also secured pantomime roles such as The Prince and later The Henchman in Snow White in Northampton (2012) and Billingham (2013) respectively, and the 2014 titular role in Aladdin at the Epstein Theatre. In 2015, Stacey took the lead role in Peter Pan He then secured the lead role in Dick Whittington at Liverpool Empire Theatre (2015), and Fleshcreep in Jack and the Beanstalk at the Billingham Forum (2016). In 2017, he took the role of Dandini in Cinderella also at Billingham. In 2019, Stacey completed a third season at the Billingham Forum playing Captain Hook in Peter Pan.

Aside from acting, Stacey became interested in fitness and gained a toned physique. He became a columnist for BestFit Magazine. Stacey also became a qualified fitness instructor, personal trainer and nutritionist and does modelling work. Stacey works in property development and became an accredited Elmhurst Energy Assessor.

== Filmography ==
Year	Title	Role	Notes
2009	Crimewatch	Gang member	Guest role
2009	Waterloo Road	Student	Guest role
2011–2012	Emmerdale	Alex Moss	Regular role
2017	The Thirteenth	Christopher Lucas	Film role
2024	Sexy Beast	Hotel manager	Guest role
2025–2026	Hollyoaks	Smithy	Guest role
