= The Stranger (British TV series) =

2020 British mystery thriller miniseries

- Promotional poster
- Also known as: Harlan Coben's The Stranger
- Created by: Harlan Coben
- Based on: The Stranger by Harlan Coben
- Written by: Danny Brocklehurst; Mick Ford; Karla Crome; Charlotte Coben
- Directed by: Daniel O'Hara; Hannah Quinn
- Starring: Richard Armitage; Siobhan Finneran; Jacob Dudman; Hannah John-Kamen; Anthony Head; Dervla Kirwan; Jennifer Saunders; Shaun Dooley; Kadiff Kirwan; Paul Kaye; Ella-Rae Smith; Brandon Fellows; Misha Handley; Stephen Rea
- Opening theme: "Monster" by Walking on Cars
- Composer: David Buckley
- Country of origin: United Kingdom
- Original language: English
- No. of episodes: 8

Production
- Executive producers: Danny Brocklehurst; Harlan Coben; Richard Fee; Nicola Shindler
- Producer: Madonna Baptiste
- Running time: 42–51 minutes
- Production company: Red Production Company

Original release
- Network: Netflix
- Release: 30 January 2020

The Stranger (also known as Harlan Coben's The Stranger) is an eight-part British mystery thriller television series written primarily by Danny Brocklehurst and based on the 2015 Harlan Coben novel of the same title. The miniseries premiered on Netflix on 30 January 2020. It stars Richard Armitage, Siobhan Finneran, Jacob Dudman, Hannah John-Kamen, and Anthony Head. It was filmed in and around Manchester, Stockport, Bolton and Bury.

== Premise ==
A mysterious stranger (Hannah John-Kamen), a woman in her 20s wearing a baseball cap, approaches Adam Price (Richard Armitage) and tells him a secret. His wife, Corrine (Dervla Kirwan) goes missing as a result of the disclosure. As the story progresses, the stranger is revealed to be connected with more secrets.

== Cast and characters ==
=== Main ===
- Richard Armitage as Adam Price, the husband of Corinne Price, and the father to Thomas and Ryan. Adam is the first person in the series to be approached by a mysterious woman with a baseball cap. She tells Adam a story about a pregnancy which his wife had faked, which turned out to be true. Corinne finds out what Adam has learned, and disappears mysteriously after she texts him that she needs some time for herself. As her mysterious disappearance is one of the central mysteries of the series, Adam's involvement with the stranger and his wife's disappearance becomes more prominent.
- Siobhán Finneran as Detective Sergeant (DS) Johanna Griffin, who was originally assigned to a case involving the beheading of an alpaca. As the series progresses, she learns about the connection between the stranger and other cases that have involved her. As she later investigates, she takes on the case involving Corinne's mysterious disappearance as well as Heidi Doyle's murder.
- Jacob Dudman as Thomas Price, the elder son of Adam and Corrine Price, and older brother of Ryan Price. Thomas has a secret that he keeps throughout the course of the series. It involved his friends Daisy Hoy and Mike Tripp. All three of them try to cover up their involvement as the police further investigate.
- Hannah John-Kamen as The Stranger, a woman in her 20s who wears a baseball cap. She finds out other people's secrets, and threatens their family or close friends by revealing them in demand for money. As the series progresses, the woman takes a prominent part of the series. She is first seen talking to Adam in a football club and then goes around telling the characters in the series about what she knows. Adam attempts to learn more about the Stranger, along with DS Johanna Griffin. While looking for his wife, Adam searches for the Stranger to find out more about what she knows. More comes to light about the Stranger as the series progresses.
- Anthony Head as Edgar Price, Adam's father, a womanizing property developer whose relationship with his son is fractured on both a personal and professional level.
- Dervla Kirwan as Corinne Price, wife of Adam Price, mother of Ryan and Thomas Price. Corinne had a secret that the Stranger told her husband. She had faked a pregnancy, which Adam had investigated further. This secret causes a devastating impact on the family and Corinne goes missing as a result. Corinne's disappearance becomes the central conflict of the series as Adam becomes more and more involved. It is later revealed that many other people's secrets were exposed by the Stranger.
- Jennifer Saunders as Heidi Doyle, a woman who owns a cake shop. She finds out from the Stranger that her daughter was involved in prostitution. The Stranger threatens Heidi by demanding money or her daughter's secret will be exposed. Heidi is later approached by Patrick Katz who claims to be investigating her daughter's case but turns out to be chasing the Stranger. Heidi's confrontation with Patrick results in her murder. Johanna Griffin takes on her case, and is emotionally distraught as Heidi was her friend. Heidi's murder becomes a secondary conflict in the series.
- Shaun Dooley as Doug Tripp, Adam's longtime friend and neighbour, who has helped Corinne run the local boys' football club. Adam discovers Corinne called Doug shortly after Adam confronted her with the Stranger's accusations.
- Kadiff Kirwan as Detective Constable (DC) Wesley Ross, who assists Johanna Griffin with the investigation of the beheading of the alpaca and a nude teenage boy who is found near a lake.
- Paul Kaye as Patrick Katz, a policeman who attempts to pursue the Stranger, even going as far as murdering Heidi Doyle, who had information about the Stranger. Patrick goes to great lengths to keep the investigators from discovering his involvement in Heidi's murder, as he collaborates with the police.
- Ella-Rae Smith as Daisy Hoy, Thomas' love interest who goes to school with him. Daisy had kept a secret after Thomas' friend, Mike had allegedly sent inappropriate pictures of Daisy's sister Ella causing Daisy to take matters into her own hands.
- Brandon Fellows as Mike Tripp, Thomas' friend who had done something wrong after a drug spike in his system, causing the police to investigate. He, along with Thomas and Daisy, try to cover up their involvement.
- Misha Handley as Ryan Price, younger son of Adam and Corinne Price, and the younger brother of Thomas Price. Thomas plays football and it is at the clubhouse where his father, Adam, is approached by the Stranger. Ryan isn't aware of his mother's secret but becomes involved with his brother and father after she goes missing. He tries to help his family find her but at the same time, he is distraught and traumatized by his mother's disappearance.
- Stephen Rea as Martin Killane, a retired police officer who Adam Price is representing in a case to protect his house from demolition by a rapacious property developer.

=== Recurring ===
- Lily Loveless as Ingrid Prisby, partner of the stranger.
- Callie Cooke as Kimberley Doyle, Heidi and Ian's daughter who is a university student.
- Jade Harrison as Vicky Hoy, Daisy and Ella's mom who is a teacher.
- Robert Ewens as Max Bonner, Thomas and Daisy's friend.
- Humera Syed as Olivia Katz, Patrick and Leila's daughter.
- Kim Vithana as Leila Katz, Patrick's ex wife.
- Guy Oliver-Watts as Ian Doyle, Heidi's husband.
- Kai Alexander as Dante Gunnarsson
- Clinton Blake as Bob Baime
- Don Gilet as Phillip Griffin
- Jemma Powell as Becca Tripp
- Chike Chan as Jason Yeong
- Sam Redford as Erik Gunnarsson
- India Brown as Ella Hoy, Daisy's younger sister. Daisy tries to seek revenge after inappropriate pictures of her sister were sent from her phone. The pictures were assumed to have been placed by Thomas' friend, Mike.
- Matthew Douglas as Larry Powers
- Aretha Ayeh as Suzanne Hope
- Joey Ansah as Stuart Hope
- Tamica Greenaway as DC Marisa Desford
- Ace Bhatti as Parth Kuhalam
- Yinka Awoni as Peter Ince

=== Guest ===
- Camilla Arfwedson as Sally Prentice
- Ritu Arya as Michaela
- Pasha Bocarie as Dan Molino

== Episodes ==
| No. | Title | Directed by | Written by | Original release date |
|---|---|---|---|---|
| 1 | "Episode 1" | Daniel O'Hara | Danny Brocklehurst | 30 January 2020 |
Family man Adam Price is approached at his son’s football match by a woman who tells him that his wife Corinne faked her most recent pregnancy and subsequent miscarriage, and suggests that Adam get his children's DNA tested. At night, his son Thomas goes out to a party with his friends Mike and Daisy. After a decapitated alpaca is found in the morning, the police (Johanna Griffin and her partner Wesley Ross) drive out to a nearby farm and talk to the farmer about her missing animal. It is revealed that Detective Griffin asked her husband for a divorce on the previous night. On the way back to the station, they see something suspicious in the woods and investigate, finding Dante, a classmate of Thomas, lying unconscious and naked on the ground. After some investigating, Adam confronts his wife about his new-found information. She tells him she wants to address it later that evening, but she never shows up, sending a text stating she needs some time.
| 2 | "Episode 2" | Daniel O'Hara | Mick Ford | 30 January 2020 |
Johanna’s best friend Heidi (Jennifer Saunders) is approached by The Stranger and her friend (Lily Loveless) who reveal that her daughter Kimberley (Callie Cooke) has been involved with an escort website called FindYourSugarBaby.com. They blackmail her to avoid releasing the information that would ruin her daughter's professional future. Adam is handling the legal case of a former policeman named Martin Killane who does not wish to be evicted from his home, he learns that his own father Ed is on the board of the adversarial land development company. Meanwhile, Adam still has no word from Corinne. Adam learns from Daisy's mother Vicky (a teacher at the school, like Corinne) that nude photos purportedly of her young daughter Ella have been released to the entire school. It is revealed that Mike decapitated the alpaca while under the influence of drugs, so he, Thomas, and Daisy plot to dispose of the animal's severed head. However, their movements are tracked by the police through Dante's phone. Mike is arrested, but Thomas and Daisy flee. Heidi is later confronted by a man (Katz) claiming to be a police officer looking into the blackmail scheme. After she hands him the evidence that The Stranger left with her, he turns violent and shoots her, eventually leaving her for dead.
| 3 | "Episode 3" | Daniel O'Hara | Karla Crome | 30 January 2020 |
A woman named Michaela is cornered by The Stranger, who reveals that a revenge porn tape was actually posted by her current fiancé and not her ex-boyfriend. Adam's son's youth football coach and another player's father (who is a policeman) arrive at Adam’s home looking to speak with Corinne about money stolen from the football team. But there is still no word from Corinne. The police question Mike concerning the alpaca head and the gathering the night Dante was injured. The police visit Dante’s house to look for clues and find photos of Daisy stuck to his wall. On his computer, they find homemade videos of Corinne. Daisy confesses to Thomas that she was the one who spiked Mike’s marijuana as revenge for putting the nude photos of her little sister online. With the help of Killane, Adam continues to look into leads surrounding Corinne’s whereabouts. Using a phone tracking app, Thomas and Ryan can track their mother's phone. After repeated failures to get in touch with her friend, Johanna discovers Heidi's body.
| 4 | "Episode 4" | Hannah Quinn | Danny Brocklehurst | 30 January 2020 |
The Stranger confronts Ed about his past affairs, telling him that he has a child he is unaware of. After he demands more proof than she provided him, she runs off. At Heidi's café, the police begin their investigation into her murder. Johanna asks Wes to hide the fact that she knew Heidi so that she can be assigned to the investigation. Adam confronts Mike's dad, Doug, after learning that the secretive phone call that Corinne made on the day of her disappearance was to him. Doug tells Adam that the phone call concerned the money stolen from the football club and that Corinne wanted more time to sort the situation out and to show her innocence. At the murder investigation, Katz attempts to throw suspicion on Heidi's husband or a burglar and volunteers to check the security videotape. Thomas and Ryan tell Adam that they have tracked Corinne's phone, and the three of them, with Killane, drive toward it, but eventually they find the phone abandoned on a bridge. Adam finally reports Corinne as a missing person to the police. Kimberley tells Johanna about the blackmail attempt on Heidi without disclosing the reason. Olivia, a schoolmate of Mike, Daisy and Thomas, collapses at a football game. We now learn that Katz is Olivia's father. He rushes to her side at the hospital. Wes and Johanna, unaware of Corinne's having gone missing, go to the Prices' house to speak with her after evidence at the café indicates that Corinne had been at the scene of Heidi's murder.
| 5 | "Episode 5" | Hannah Quinn | Charlotte Coben | 30 January 2020 |
The Stranger and her friend visit a sports stadium, where she hands an envelope to the father of an athlete who took steroids, demanding 10,000 pounds blackmail from him. He attacks her and her friend rescues her using a taser. Johanna interviews Adam, telling him that Corinne's key fob was found at the café where Heidi was murdered. As Katz looks on, Adam tells Johanna of the visit from The Stranger that sparked Corinne's disappearance, and about the other victims he is aware of. Thomas and Mike go to see Daisy, and Mike confronts her over her belief that he had proliferated the nude photos of Ella. She believes his protestations of innocence, and admits to having drugged him with PCP during the rave, confessing that Olivia was the person who had accused Mike to her. They go to see Olivia, but her mother lies, saying that Olivia is still in the hospital. The Stranger and her friend wonder why they had not heard from Heidi and learn online that she has been murdered, thereupon deciding to immediately shut down their operation. Phillip (Johanna's estranged husband) visits her at work. Katz admits to never commencing a missing person's investigation for Corinne; after seeing the file, Wes and Johanna realize that Corinne is the woman whom Dante had filmed. Killane phones Adam about the demolition equipment in his neighbourhood and tells him that he has located The Stranger's accomplice, Ingrid, and that she is connected to a detective agency. Adam and Doug arrive at Ingrid's office address while she is destroying evidence, but they are not allowed in. Later they follow her in their car but lose her. Thomas, Mike, and Daisy witness Olivia's mother disposing of syringes and rat poison boxes in a neighbour's bin. Ed visits Killane appealing to him once more to accept eviction and move, then telling him that the demolition order has gone through. Adam and Killane witness the demolition of Killane's flat, which unearths a body.
| 6 | "Episode 6" | Hannah Quinn | Mick Ford | 30 January 2020 |
Killane is jailed, and confesses to Adam that he had murdered his wife many years earlier for threatening to leave him and take their child. Katz visits the Powers', a couple who own the company Ethical Share, which aims to open investment to the masses by handling trades through churches. Mr Powers says that Katz is the head of security for the venture, Katz replies that the evidence packet he got from Heidi shows that Powers was deeply involved with Kimberley. Adam tells Johanna of Killane's confession. Johanna tells him that Corinne's car was located, and together they go to it and discover one of Corinne's earrings in the rear seat. Thomas, Mike, and Daisy decide to try again to confront Olivia; she admits to Thomas that it was her, not Mike, who sent the photos from Ella's phone out of jealousy for Mike's attention. Adam tells Johanna about Ingrid. Wes finds Ingrid's office cleaned out. Interviewing café workers about Heidi's last days, Johanna learns of Heidi's meeting with The Stranger and Ingrid in a car park; she telephones the station to ask Wes to pull security video. Johanna shows the videotape to Kimberley, who confesses to her work with the Sugar Baby website and to being made aware by her mother of the blackmail. Mike tells Daisy that his memory of the rave night is returning through flashbacks, and he remembers killing the alpaca with a shovel, but nothing concerning Dante other than that Dante was going into the woods with Daisy. Adam tells Ed of Corinne's disappearance. Thomas speaks with Olivia about her constant illnesses, telling her about the rat poison.
| 7 | "Episode 7" | Daniel O'Hara | Danny Brocklehurst | 30 January 2020 |
Thomas admits to Katz his suspicions about Olivia being poisoned by her mother, so he gets to Olivia and removes her from the reach of his wife. Dante, recovering in hospital, is interviewed by Johanna; he tells her that Daisy absconded with his clothes after an invitation to skinny-dip. He said he then was discovered by Max Bonner (Robert Ewens), the sports club caretaker, who chased him with an axe, but that he remembers nothing more. Johanna and Wes interview Max, who claims he was only harvesting firewood and did no harm to Dante, who simply tripped and fell. Ed brings Peter Ince, a private investigator, to Adam to assist in the search for Corinne. Adam tells Ed and Peter about Corinne's fake pregnancy, his own affair, and The Stranger, prompting Ed to relate that The Stranger had visited him as well. The Stranger had been in the hospital while Killane was there. Ed surmises that the two are connected and Ed, Peter, and Adam begin to go through Killane's possessions, which Ed's company holds in storage. Johanna eulogizes Heidi at her memorial, while Wes reviews the case evidence. Johanna goes to Katz's house, and he tells her about his daughter's poisoning. Wes telephones Johanna and, on speakerphone, says that he found a videotape showing Katz arriving at the murder scene. Katz attacks Johanna, who locks herself in a bathroom whilst Wes and other police race to the scene. Katz retrieves a gun and then confesses murdering Heidi to Johanna. Adam finds a photo of Killane with The Stranger, who returns to the hospital and enters Killane's room, calling him dad.
| 8 | "Episode 8" | Daniel O'Hara | Danny Brocklehurst | 30 January 2020 |
Katz's ex-wife, Leila, goes to his home, demanding to know where to find Olivia. Katz assaults Leila, who cries for help, and Johanna escapes to a neighbour. Katz takes Leila's car, in possession of Johanna's phone, and drives away. Peter tracks The Stranger (Christine Killane's) home address. Adam phones Johanna, reaching Katz, saying that The Stranger has been identified, and promising to text the location to Johanna's phone later, which he does on arrival at Christine's home address. Adam enters the apartment building, then is attacked and knocked unconscious by Ingrid. He wakes in The Stranger's apartment, chained to an anchored table. She tells of finding out later that her father had killed her mother. She also discloses that she learned that Killane (unbeknownst to him) is not her biological father, and that she is Adam's half-sister through an affair Ed Price had with her mother. Katz bursts in brandishing a gun and holding Ingrid hostage; he tosses Ingrid to the ground and then shoots her in the stomach. Adam escapes from his chains and attacks Katz but is overpowered. When Katz shoots at Adam, Christine jumps in front to take the bullet in her back. Police enter to take control of the situation. Johanna arrests Katz for Heidi's murder. Christine is hospitalized; Ingrid dies of her wounds. Christine admits to Adam that Bob, the football coach, had hired her to dig dirt on Corinne. Adam confronts Bob, and Bob tells Adam that Doug claimed Corinne stole the money from the football club and intended to pin the theft on him. Adam drives to Doug's house and confronts him about stealing the money and sending texts from Corinne's phone after her disappearance, pulling a gun that Christine passed to him in the ambulance. In fear, Doug offers to take Adam to Corinne, who is in the countryside. Johanna visits the school to have Thomas use the phone tracker to locate Adam. On reaching the site, Doug admits to killing Corinne with a blow to the head with a hammer and burying her after Adam locates her body in a shallow grave. Adam shoots and kills Doug as Johanna arrives. In an epilogue set six months later, Johanna has reunited with Phillip after her retirement, and she attends one of Ryan's football matches; Ed also attends. Bob coaches, Dante films the match, Thomas and Daisy are an item, Christine has "absconded," and a flashback reveals that Johanna covered up the evidence of Adam's killing Doug and that, apparently despite Katz being under arrest at the time, she had successfully pinned Doug's death (by Katz's gun) on Katz, who is due for sentencing. In the final scene, Christine is shown observing the football match from afar.

== Production ==
It was announced in January 2019 that Netflix had begun development of a miniseries based on the 2015 Harlan Coben novel, with the adaptation being written by Danny Brocklehurst and with Richard Armitage set to star. By March, the cast was rounded out, with the additions including Siobhan Finneran, Hannah John-Kamen, Jennifer Saunders, Anthony Head and Stephen Rea.

=== Filming ===
Filming began in March 2019, taking place in Manchester. Scenes were shot in Bury and Bolton in April, and in Stockport in June.

== Reception ==
The review aggregator website Rotten Tomatoes reported an 87% approval rating for the miniseries with an average rating of 6.6/10, based on 23 reviews. The website's critical consensus states, "If not quite as addicting as its source material, The Stranger has a strong cast and enough tension to keep viewers on the edge of their seats." On Metacritic, it has a weighted average score of 62 out of 100, based on 5 critics, indicating "generally favorable reviews".
