= Raised by Wolves (British TV series) =

- Genre: Sitcom
- Created by: Caitlin Moran; Caroline Moran
- Written by: Caitlin Moran; Caroline Moran
- Starring: Rebekah Staton; Helen Monks; Alexa Davies; Molly Risker; Philip Jackson; Caden Ellis Wall; Erin Freeman; Kaine Zajaz; Erin Kellyman; Brandon Fellows
- Country of origin: United Kingdom
- Original language: English
- No. of series: 2
- No. of episodes: 13

Production
- Executive producers: Kenton Allen; Caroline Leddy
- Producer: Caroline Norris
- Running time: 30 minutes
- Production company: Big Talk Productions

Original release
- Network: Channel 4
- Release: 23 December 2013 – 6 April 2016

Raised by Wolves is a British television sitcom written by Caitlin Moran and her sister Caroline Moran, first broadcast between 2013 and 2016. It follows a loose account of the siblings' youth in Wolverhampton, transposed to the modern day. Helen Monks and Alexa Davies star as the oldest sisters in a large family raised by an unconventional single mother.

== Broadcast history ==
A pilot episode was developed by the BBC and broadcast on Channel 4 on 23 December 2013, and the show was subsequently ordered to series. A six-part series began broadcasting on Channel 4 on 16 March 2015. The first series attracted an average of 1.3 million viewers and 6.3% share of audience per episode, making it Channel 4's second highest-rating comedy of 2015. A second six-part series was filmed in late 2015, which began broadcasting on 2 March 2016. The show was cancelled on 9 August 2016 due to Channel 4's "commitments to new programmes" for the following year.

On 18 October 2016, the Moran sisters launched a Kickstarter campaign to raise money to make a third series of the show. The plan was to make a special one-off episode if the campaign received £320,000 by 20 November 2016; or to make a third series (to be premiered in late 2017) if more than £320,000 was donated. The campaign was unsuccessful and plans for a third series were cancelled.

== Cast ==
- Rebekah Staton as Della Garry
- Philip Jackson as Grampy
- Helen Monks as Germaine Garry
- Alexa Davies as Aretha Garry
- Molly Risker as Yoko Garry
- Caden Ellis Wall as Wyatt Garry
- Kaine Zajaz as Lee Rhind
- Erin Freeman as Mariah Garry
- Brandon Fellows as Callum
- Erin Kellyman as Cathy
- Paul Higgins as Sean (Series 2)

== Episodes ==
=== Pilot (2013) ===
No. overall	No. in series	Title	Directed by	Written by	Original release date
1	Pilot	"Pilot"	Ian Fitzgibbon	Caitlin Moran, Caroline Moran	23 December 2013
Della Garry lives in Wolverhampton with her five daughters and one son. Eldest daughter Germaine is smitten by local bad boy Lee Rhind, even though he is meant to have shot a snail with an air rifle, and has built a shrine to him.

=== Series 1 (2015) ===
No. overall	No. in series	Title	Directed by	Written by	Original release date
2	1	"Hand Jam"	Ian Fitzgibbon	Caitlin Moran, Caroline Moran	16 March 2015
Della takes the girls foraging for free food on the common. On the way Germaine is thrilled to see Lee Rhind's house is next to the common. The girls find foraging boring and the onset of Yoko's period halts the exercise.
3	2	"Yoko's Got Talent"	Ian Fitzgibbon	Caitlin Moran, Caroline Moran	23 March 2015
Germaine interrupts her sisters' Britain's Got Talent session to announce that she needs new knickers and, since Yoko also needs a new bra, Della grudgingly takes her daughters to town, shopping.
4	3	"Mehmesis"	Ian Fitzgibbon	Caitlin Moran, Caroline Moran	30 March 2015
Cousin Cathy calls by unannounced and everybody is pleased to see her - except Germaine, and to make matters worse Cathy attracts the desirable Lee Rhind.
5	4	"The iPhone, the Bitch and the Wardrobe"	Ian Fitzgibbon	Caitlin Moran, Caroline Moran	6 April 2015
Della believes that the girls should socialize more and makes them attend the birthday party for depressive Uncle Natie, whose wife has left him. Yoko is very nervous but is declared a champion due to her unexpected skill at computer games whilst Germaine is annoyed to find that Cathy has invited Lee Rhind as her guest.
6	5	"Little Orphan Mannie"	Ian Fitzgibbon	Caitlin Moran, Caroline Moran	13 April 2015
After Grampy's mother dies and his wife dumps him - literally, in a layby - Della decides he should move in with the family and takes Aretha to collect his mourning clothes, narrowly avoiding a meeting with her hated mother.
7	6	"The Dorch"	Ian Fitzgibbon	Caitlin Moran, Caroline Moran	20 April 2015
Germaine is thrilled to hear that Lee Rhind is on the market again after a split from Cathy and discovers that he is going to the Dorchester night club. Della consents to her going - provided she takes Yoko, whose dancing is a hit, and Aretha. However, having been mistaken for a prostitute and realizing that she is attractive to men, Germaine ditches Lee to explore other options.

=== Series 2 (2016) ===
No. overall	No. in series	Title	Directed by	Written by	Original release date
8	1	"The Monroe Technique"	Ian Fitzgibbon	Caitlin Moran, Caroline Moran	2 March 2016
To save money Della cancels the Internet, forcing the girls to go to the library where bookish Yoko and Aretha are quite at home though Germaine finds it boring and quiet. However a chance encounter with Callum allows her to use the Monroe Technique and secure a date with him.
9	2	"Hairy Poppins"	Ian Fitzgibbon	Caitlin Moran, Caroline Moran	9 March 2016
With landlady Laura coming to inspect the house Della not only organizes a clean-up but sends the children for a day with their unemployed, former left wing campaigner father Sean. He takes them for a picnic in the country in woodlands, now claimed by a private company where their exercise in civil disobedience ends in arrest.
10	3	"Old School"	Ian Fitzgibbon	Caitlin Moran, Caroline Moran	16 March 2016
Having home educated the children Della is shocked when Aretha declares that she wants to go to school and coerces Callum into being her guardian whilst Sean also turns up to promise that he will get even with any bullies. Unfortunately the school is chaotic and badly run and Aretha's rant against it gets her excluded.
11	4	"Working Girl"	Ian Fitzgibbon	Caitlin Moran, Caroline Moran	23 March 2016
As Aretha enjoys college life with radical Economics lecturer Ruby, Della takes Germaine, who claims to be pregnant, to work with her at Pound Lord to show her what real life is like. The pregnancy is a false scare but Della does meet up with old flame Michael and ends the day with a proposition for Callum.
12	5	"The Car Boot"	Ian Fitzgibbon	Caitlin Moran, Caroline Moran	30 March 2016
To raise money to pay the gas bill Della drags the family off to a car boot sale where the little ones do well by playing the sympathy card, but Yoko and Aretha's environmentally friendly method of organizing car parking causes chaos.
13	6	"Dead Man's Caravan"	Ian Fitzgibbon	Caitlin Moran, Caroline Moran	6 April 2016
Della and the family head off for Wales to stay in a caravan that was owned by Grampy's late friend Deano, but with Aretha and Germaine both feeling dumped by objects of their affections.

== Reception ==
Raised by Wolves was generally well received by critics: The Daily Telegraph called it "terrific" and "refreshingly honest", as "every one-liner was a zinger"; while The Independent described it as "great fun" and with "joie de vivre to spare"; and The Guardian described it as a "loving and funny sitcom".

Amidst this acclaim, the Glasgow Herald complained about the focus on a character's first period in the pilot episode, labelling the comedy "a bloody mess".

With the arrival of the second series in 2016, the Radio Times declared that "the comedy gets even better. And filthier."

== American series ==
It was announced in January 2017 that ABC would be remaking the series with Aaron Guzikowski and Diablo Cody as writers and Greg Berlanti producing. In February it was announced that Georgia King would play the lead.
