= Eva O'Hara =

British actress

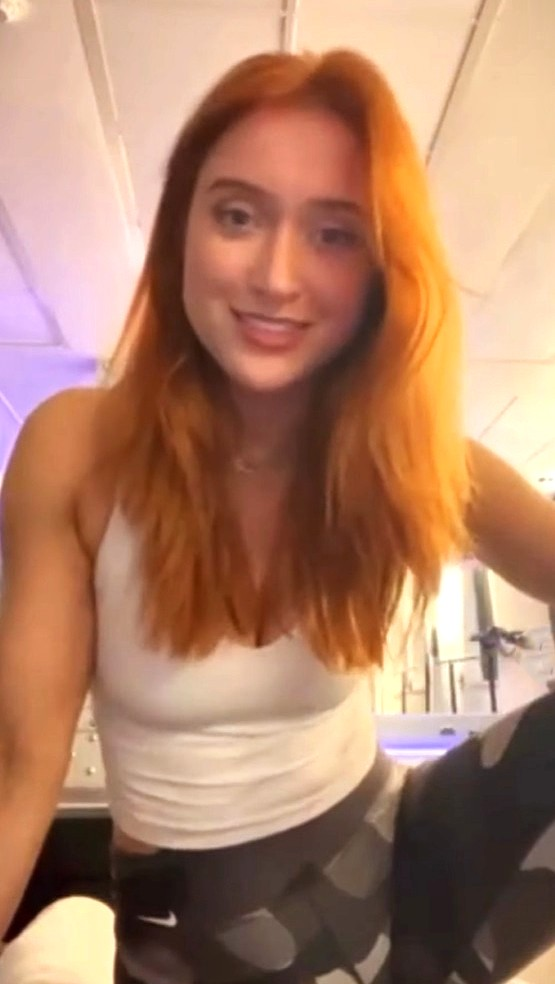
- O'Hara in 2024
- Education: Bristol Old Vic Theatre School
- Occupation: Actress
- Years active: 2016–present
- Television: Hollyoaks

Eva O'Hara is a British actress. O'Hara studied at the Bristol Old Vic Theatre School, where she performed in various productions at the Bristol Old Vic. She also appeared in other stage productions and short films, and made her film debut as Rosalind in Stark Shakespeare in 2018. After graduating from the school in 2019, O'Hara was cast as Verity Hutchinson in the British soap opera Hollyoaks, with the character first appearing in January 2020. O'Hara later chose to leave the role and the character was killed off in December 2022. In 2024, O'Hara returned to stage and performed in Windsor Theatre Royal's adaptation of The Great Gatsby.

== Career ==
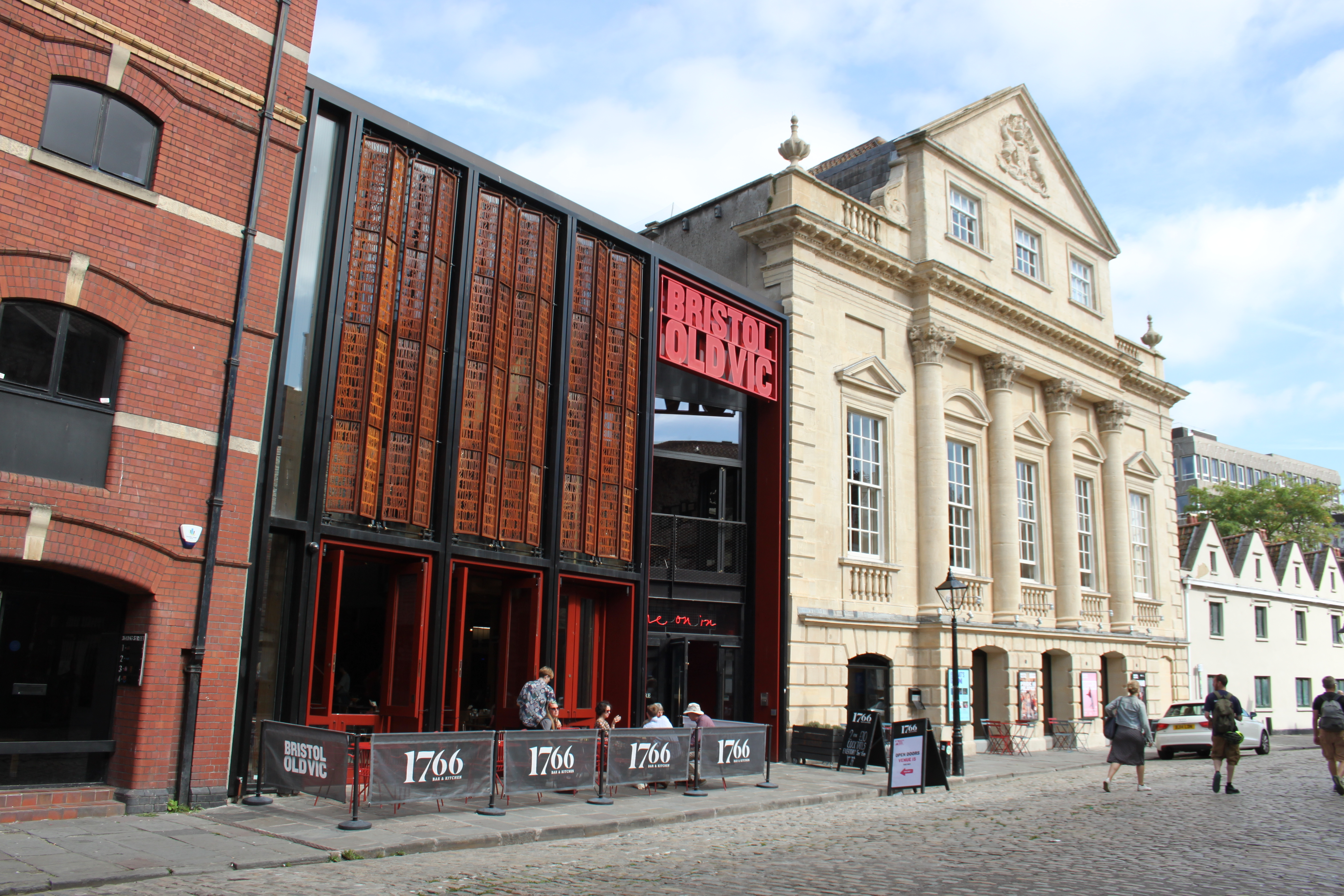
O'Hara performed in various plays at the Bristol Old Vic.

O'Hara studied at the Bristol Old Vic Theatre School, where she graduated with a BA in Acting in 2019. Whilst studying there, she performed in several plays at the Bristol Old Vic, including their adaptations of A View from the Bridge (2018), How My Light Is Spent (2019), Lungs (2017) and The Comedy of Errors (2018), the latter of which was performed at the Edinburgh Festival Fringe. She also starred in the student short film Honesty (2019), in addition to the short films Digging (2017) and Your Move (2019). Outside of the Bristol Old Vic, O'Hara portrayed Mary Magdalene in The Mysteries at the Playbox Theatre in 2016 and Eva in Where We Come From at the Actors Centre in 2019, the latter of which she co-directed. In 2016, O'Hara played Rosalind in the stage production of Shakespeare's Forests, and she made her film debut as Rosalind in Stark Shakespeare in 2018. In 2019, O'Hara portrayed Mrs Robin in the musical Mr. Maglump at the Bristol Old Vic, which was watched by composer Andrew Lloyd Webber. That June, O'Hara appeared as Kate Nickleby in the Bristol Old Vic's adaptation of The Life and Adventures of Nicholas Nickleby. O'Hara has won the Andy Frazer Stage Combat award, in addition to being a finalist of the Alan Bates and BBC Radio Carlton Hobbs awards.

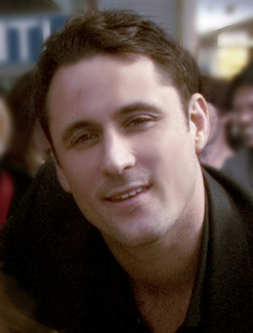
O'Hara's Hollyoaks character Verity was introduced as the half-sister of long-running character Tony Hutchinson, played by Nick Pickard (pictured).

In December 2019, it was announced that O'Hara had been cast as Verity Hutchinson on the British soap opera Hollyoaks for its 25th anniversary year in a regular role. The character had previously been announced that September prior to the news of O'Hara's casting. Verity was introduced as the daughter of Edward Hutchinson (Joe McGann) and the half-sister of Hollyoaks' longest-running character, Tony Hutchinson (Nick Pickard). Verity was described as "ruthless and cunning" and a character who can "hold her own in any situation and really doesn't take no for an answer", with O'Hara revealing that she sometimes is jealous of the character's "fearlessness". O'Hara had watched the soap when she was a child. Speaking of her casting, O'Hara said, "I have been totally bowled over by the wonderful team at Hollyoaks. I have fallen in love with the warmth and passion of everyone involved, and feel utterly blessed to be involved in such a creative environment." O'Hara debuted as Verity in the 2020 revival episode of the Hollyoaks late night spinoff Hollyoaks Later, which aired on 6 January 2020. When O'Hara was filming her debut scenes, she fell over and hit the floor, which she recalled as being humorous and "a nice way to break the ice" with her colleague.

Verity's storylines on the soap have included setting up her own law firm in the village, a love triangle involving Kurt Benson (Jeremy Edwards) and Sami Maalik (Rishi Nair), lying about being pregnant, a romance with Shaq Qureshi (Omar Malik) and finding out about her brother Eric Foster's (Angus Castle-Doughty) radical misogyny. In March 2022, O'Hara played a pivotal role in a special Hollyoaks International Women's Day episode, portraying both Verity and a woman from the 1950s in a flashback, with the actress feeling "immensely proud" of the episode and hoping that it would help spark conversation among viewers and highlight the "everyday prejudices" that women face.

In 2022, O'Hara chose to leave the soap and she made her last appearance as Verity in December 2022, when the character was killed off. The departure had not been announced prior to the broadcast of Verity's death, which saw her be murdered by an unknown assailant, who was later revealed to be Bobby Costello (Jayden Fox). O'Hara had been hoping for a "dramatic end" for Verity and was delighted but also saddened when she learnt that the character would be killed-off. O'Hara explained that she had had a meeting with executive producer Lucy Allan, where there was initially an idea that the character would have a happy ending, but O'Hara revealed that she pushed for "something more meaty". The actress revealed that she became good friends with co-star Castle-Doughty during their time on the soap and that he gave her a painting of the pair of them as her leaving gift. Following her exit, O'Hara thanked her fans for supporting her and revealed that she planned to rest and return to theatre, which she had missed during her time on Hollyoaks. Stephen Patterson from Metro called O'Hara's performance as Verity "nothing short of spectacular".

In 2024, O'Hara returned to theatre and portrayed Jordan Baker in Windsor Theatre Royal's adaptation of The Great Gatsby, directed by Roy Marsden. That same year, she appeared in the short film White Knight and in 2025, voiced the role of Mrs Schumacher in the audiobook The Rat Catcher.

== Personal life ==
O'Hara identifies as part of the LGBTQ+ community. In 2022, she took part in a LGBTQ+ Hollyoaks photoshoot for LGBTQ+ History Month, where she said that "the attention and the conversation needs to be had with the queer community" until the "history of inequality" could be rectified in the industry. O'Hara has experience in several sports, including kickboxing, swimming and yoga. She also gained a Level 3 certificate in Personal Training, and is an ambassador for Future Fit. She enjoys climbing, singing and playing instruments. The actress felt that Verity's fashion style on Hollyoaks had impacted her to wear more colourful clothing.

== Acting credits ==
=== Filmography ===
Year	Title	Role	Notes	Ref.
2017	Digging	Ellie	Short film	
2018	Stark Shakespeare	Film	Rosalind	
2019	Honesty	Louise	Short film	
2019	Your Move	Player Two	Short film	
2020	Hollyoaks Later	Verity Hutchinson	1 episode	
2020–22	Hollyoaks	Verity Hutchinson	Regular role	
2024	White Knight	Head Hostess	Short film	

=== Theatre ===
Year	Production	Venue	Role
2016	The Mysteries	Playbox Theatre	Mary Magdalene
2016	Shakespeare's Forests	Shakespeare Young Company	Rosalind
2017	Lungs	Bristol Old Vic	W
2018	The Comedy of Errors	Bristol Old Vic and Edinburgh Fringe Festival	Emilia
2018	A View from the Bridge	Bristol Old Vic	Catherine
2019	How My Light Is Spent	Bristol Old Vic	Kitty
2019	Where We Come From	The Actors Centre	Eva
2019	The Life and Adventures of Nicholas Nickleby	Bristol Old Vic	Kate Nickleby
2019	Mr. Maglump	Bristol Old Vic	Mrs Robin
2024	The Great Gatsby	Theatre Royal, Windsor	Jordan Baker
