= Isabelle Smith =

English actress (born 2000s)

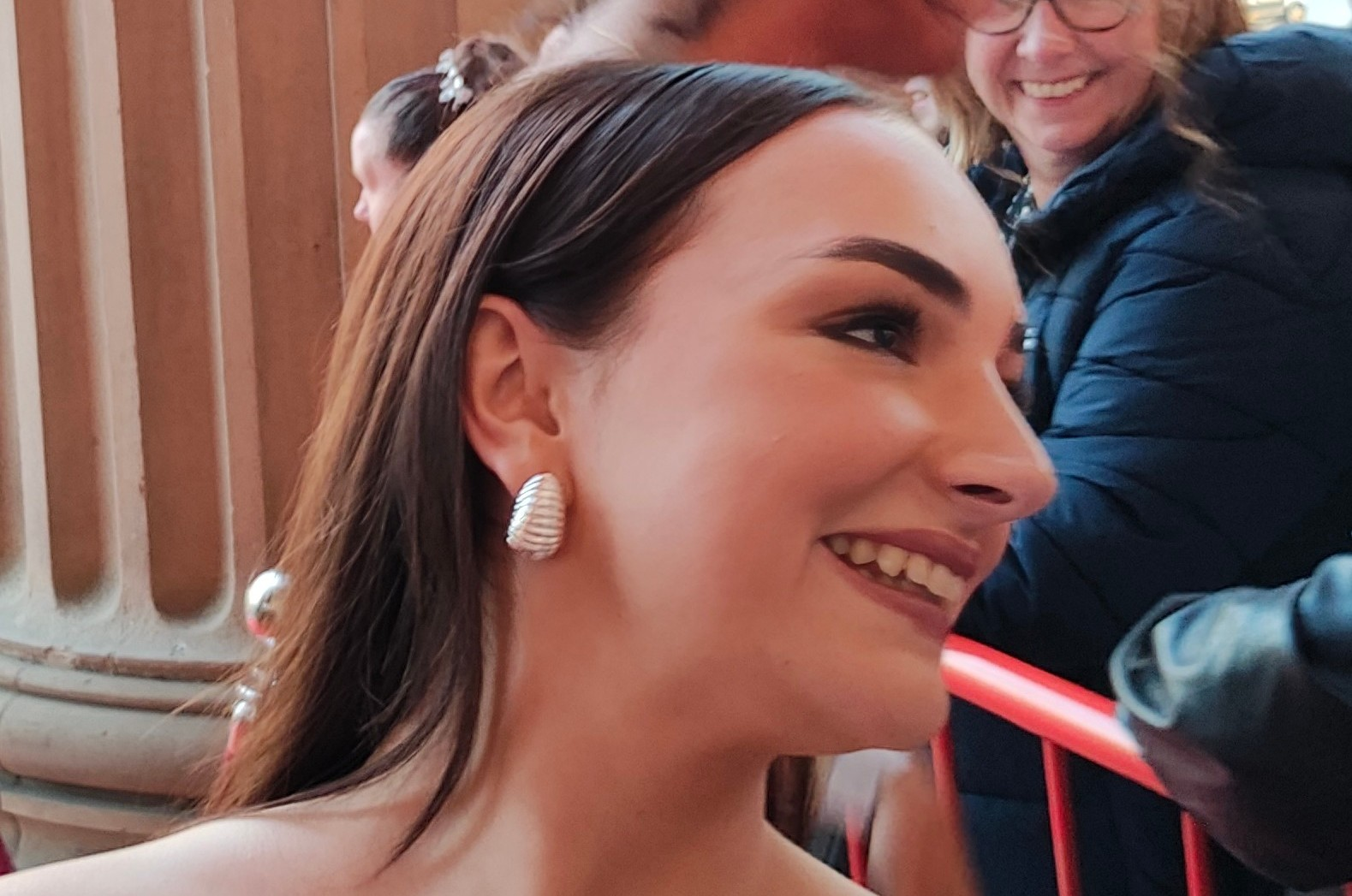
- Smith in 2025
- Education: Arden School of Theatre (BA)
- Occupation: Actress
- Years active: 2014–present
- Television: Hollyoaks

Isabelle Smith is an English actress. She made her acting debut in a stage production of Gypsy, before going on to make minor appearances in British television series including Coronation Street and Maternal. Then, in 2024, she appeared in the BBC soap opera Doctors, as well as being cast in the regular role of Frankie Osborne on the Channel 4 soap opera Hollyoaks. For her role as Frankie, she has received nominations for various accolades, as well as winning Best Newcomer at the Inside Soap Awards.

== Early and personal life ==
Smith attended Fairfield High School for Girls in Droylsden, before going on to attend Ashton Sixth Form College from 2018 to 2020. At the latter, she studied drama, photography and history for her A-levels. Then, from 2020 to 2023, she studied at the Arden School of Theatre, where she attained a BA degree. She has since been vocal on her thoughts of the acting industry being "elitist" and holding working-class women back from acting. She stated: "people have paid to go to private school, or to RADA or whatever, you're constantly having to prove yourself into every room that you’re going into, because you've maybe not had the same education as other people that you (are) sat next to."

Since 2023, she has been in a relationship with accountant Adam Seel.

== Career ==
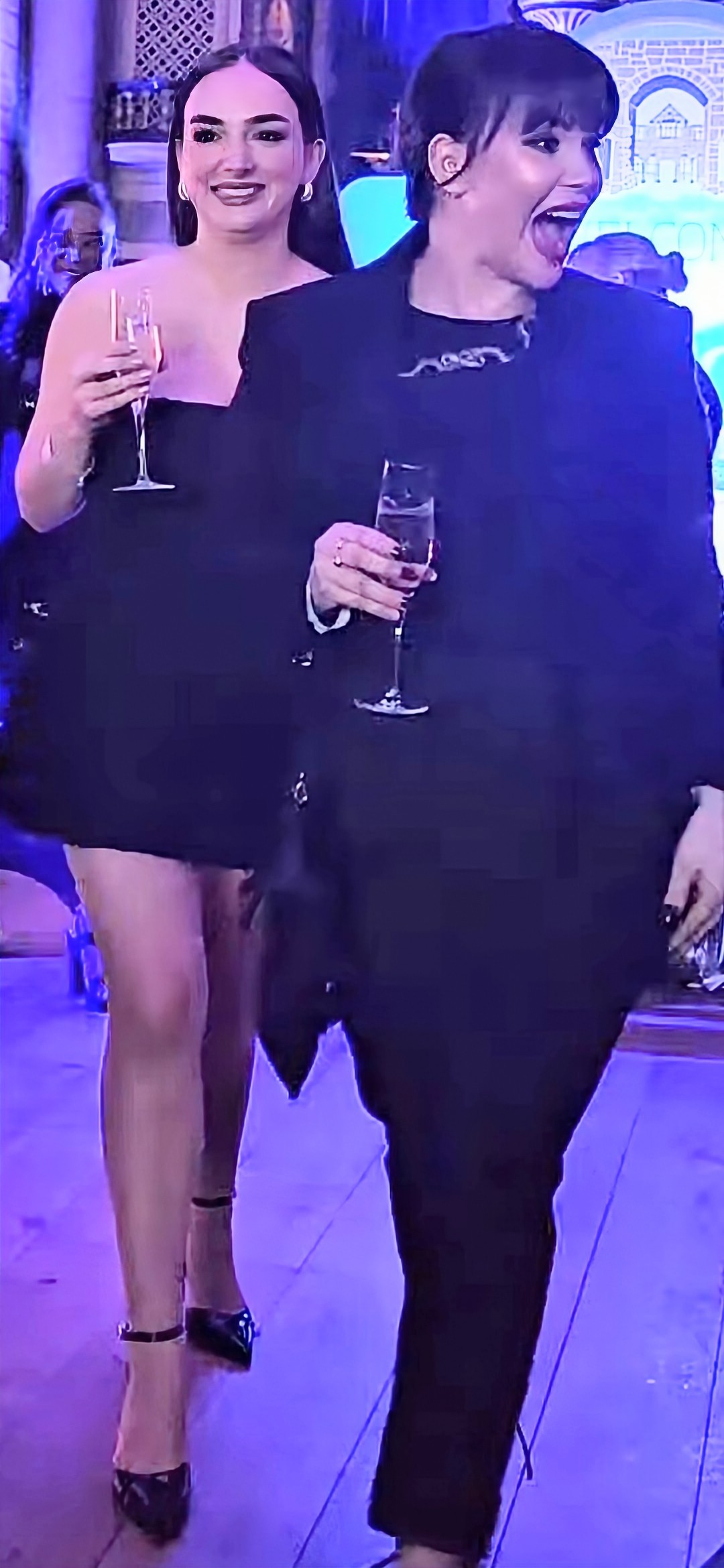
Smith and Jessica Fox at the Hollyoaks 30th Anniversary Party in 2025

Smith made her acting debut in a production of Gypsy at the Garrick Theatre in 2014. Two years later, she sang at A Night at the Musicals on West End theatre. In 2022, she made her television debut as Sonya on the ITV1 soap opera Coronation Street. She appeared in three episodes as a love interest for Max Turner (Paddy Bever). A year later, she appeared in an episode of ITV1's Maternal.

In January 2024, Smith began appearing in the regular role of Frankie Osborne on the Channel 4 soap opera. Smith filmed for an episode of the BBC soap opera Doctors that aired in October 2024, marking her third soap role. She portrayed Bea Reynolds, a teenager who killed her sister. Shortly into Smith's tenure on Hollyoaks, she was featured at the centre of a storyline about sibling sexual abuse, with JJ Osborne (Ryan Mulvey) abusing Smith's character. For her portrayal of Frankie, she was nominated for numerous accolades, including winning the Best Newcomer award at the Inside Soap Awards and being nominated for Best Leading Performer at the upcoming 2025 British Soap Awards. In July 2025, it was reported that Smith would also portray Frankie in the Hollyoaks late-night special Hollyoaks Later for the soap's 30th anniversary, which was broadcast on 22 October of that year.

== Filmography ==
Year	Title	Role	Notes
2020	Real Voices	Sacha	Short film
2021	The Eighteenth Silence	Bailey	Film
2021	Indecision	Paige Shuman	Short film
2022	Coronation Street	Sonya	Recurring role
2023	Maternal	Jenny Thompson	1 episode
2023	Kiss	Carley	Short film
2024	Ridley	Donna Burnside	1 episode
2024–present	Hollyoaks	Frankie Osborne	Regular role
2024	Doctors	Bea Reynolds	Episode: "Little Triggers"
2025	Hollyoaks Later	Frankie Osborne	Late night special

== Stage ==
Year	Title	Role	Venue
2014	Gypsy	Baby Louise	Garrick Theatre
2016	A Night at the Musicals	Singer	West End
2020	Real Voices	Sacha	Act4TV

== Awards and nominations ==
Year	Ceremony	Category	Nominated work	Result	Ref.
2024	I Talk Telly Awards	Best Soap Newcomer	Hollyoaks	Nominated	
2024	I Talk Telly Awards	Best Soap Performance	Hollyoaks	Nominated	
2024	Inside Soap Awards	Best Newcomer	Hollyoaks	Won	
2024	TVTimes Awards	Favourite Soap Actor	Hollyoaks	Nominated	
2025	TV Choice Awards	Best Soap Newcomer	Hollyoaks	Nominated	
2025	British Soap Awards	Best Dramatic Performance	Hollyoaks	Nominated	
2025	British Soap Awards	Best Leading Performer	Hollyoaks	Longlisted	
2025	British Soap Awards	Best Newcomer	Hollyoaks	Won	
2025	Digital Spy Reader Awards	Best Soap Actor	Hollyoaks	Nominated	
