= Alex Fletcher (actress) =

English actress (born 1976)

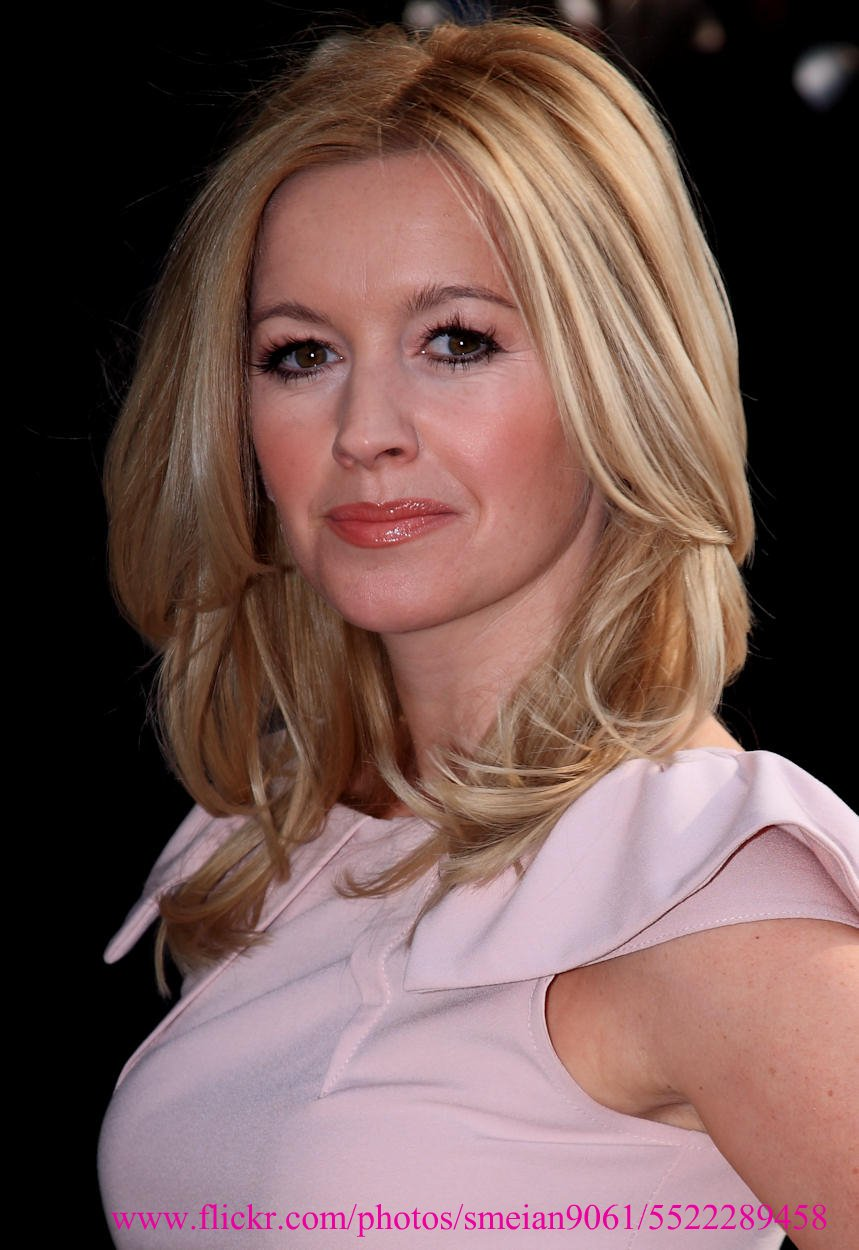
- Fletcher in March 2011
- Born: Alexandra Fletcher; 8 July 1976 (age 50); Childwall, Liverpool, England
- Other name: Alex Fletcher
- Occupation: Actress
- Years active: 1990–present
- Spouse: Neil Davies (m. 2003)
- Children: 2, including Yasmin Davies

Alexandra Fletcher (born 8 July 1976) is an English actress, known for her roles as Jacqui Dixon in Brookside and Diane Hutchinson in Hollyoaks.

== Career ==
Fletcher joined Brookside in 1990, and played the role of Jacqui Dixon until the series ended in 2003. In addition to her role in Brookside, she has made a number of other television appearances, both in acting and presenting roles. These include parts in Doctors and Murder Investigation Team, and a guest presenting role on the chat show Loose Women.

Fletcher took some time away from acting in the late 2000s and trained as a fitness instructor. She qualified in 2009, and taught at a number of locations. Fletcher joined Hollyoaks in August 2010 as Diane O'Connor. She also appeared as a contestant on the BBC cookery programme Celebrity MasterChef, on 21 July 2010. Fletcher remained on Hollyoaks for 16 years until her decision to leave the show.

== Personal life ==
Fletcher married actor Neil Davies in 2003; Davies previously appeared in Brookside as Robbie Moffatt, an on-screen boyfriend of Fletcher's character. The pair have a son and a daughter, Yasmin Davies, together.

== Filmography ==
Year	Title	Role	Notes
1990–2003	Brookside	Jacqui Dixon	Series regular
1991	Why Don't You...?	Herself	Presenter
2005	Murder Investigation Team	Lola Biartoulis	1 episode
2006	Suburban Mayhem	Salon Receptionist	Film
2006	Doctors	Zoe Fischer	Episode: "Dying for Love"
2007	Wake	Billy	Short film
2010	Celebrity MasterChef	Herself	Contestant
2010–2026	Hollyoaks	Diane Hutchinson	Series regular
2013, 2020	Hollyoaks Later	Diane O'Connor	

== Awards and nominations ==
Year	Award	Category	Work	Result	Ref.
2002	The British Soap Awards	Best Actress	Brookside	Nominated	
2002	The British Soap Awards	Sexiest Female	Brookside	Nominated	
2003	9th National Television Awards	Most Popular Actress	Brookside	Nominated	
2015	The British Soap Awards	Best Actress	Hollyoaks	Nominated	
2018	Inside Soap Awards	Best Partnership (shared with Nick Pickard)	Hollyoaks	Nominated	
2018	Digital Spy Reader Awards	Best Soap Actor (Female)	Hollyoaks	Tenth	
2019	The British Soap Awards	Best On-Screen Partnership (shared with Pickard)	Hollyoaks	Nominated	
2021	Inside Soap Awards	Best Actress	Hollyoaks	Nominated	
