= Diane Hutchinson =

Fictional character from Hollyoaks

- Hollyoaks character
- Portrayed by: Alex Fletcher
- Duration: 2010–2026
- First appearance: 1 September 2010
- Last appearance: 13 May 2026
- Introduced by: Paul Marquess
- Spin-off appearances: Hollyoaks Later (2013, 2020)
- Crossover appearances: Brookside (2025)
In-universe information
- Other names: Diane O'Connor; Diane Drinkwell
- Occupation: Marketer; School counsellor Waitress; Restaurant owner Pub landlady
- Sisters: Lynette Drinkwell; Babs Drinkwell
- Husband: Rob O'Connor (until 2011); Tony Hutchinson (2014–2024, 2025–2026)
- Sons: Anthony Hutchinson; Ro Hutchinson
- Daughters: Eva Hutchinson
- Adoptive daughters: Dee Dee Hutchinson
- Stepsons: Finn O'Connor; Harry Thompson; Beau Ramsey
- Stepdaughters: Sinead O'Connor; Morgan Osborne
- Aunts: Wendy
- Nephews: Scott Drinkwell (adoptive)
- Nieces: Lily Drinkwell

Diane Hutchinson (also O'Connor) is a fictional character from the British Channel 4 soap opera Hollyoaks, played by Alex Fletcher. The character made her first appearance on 1 September 2010. Diane was introduced into the series by Hollyoaks' executive producer Paul Marquess during his rejuvenation of the show, where he axed numerous characters and replaced them with new families. Fletcher began filming in June 2010, the same month her casting was publicised. Diane was introduced with her husband, Rob (Gary Cargill) and stepchildren, Sinead (Stephanie Davis) and Finn O'Connor (Connor Wilkinson). The O'Connors are one of three families that were introduced in 2010. Diane is characterised as a "loving wife" and a "devoted stepmum". Fletcher initially hoped that Diane would be likeable despite her over the top demeanour. Fletcher believed Diane has a good relationship with her stepchildren and was loath to portray her as "the wicked stepmother".

Diane's storylines originally focused on her fertility issues and subsequent In vitro fertilisation (IVF) treatment. Fletcher wanted to portray the storyline accurately because many women are affected by the issue. Diane's IVF treatment fails and she subsequently steals a baby from a hospital. Additional storylines include her divorce from Rob, dealing with Sinead and Finn's erratic behaviour, marrying Tony Hutchinson (Nick Pickard), giving birth to twins and the discovery that her and Tegan Lomax's (Jessica Ellis) babies were swapped at birth. Diane later develops obsessive–compulsive disorder. Diane was killed-off on 13 May 2026 after featuring in a high-profile ovarian cancer storyline, which eventually claimed her life. Diane made temporary departures in 2015 and 2016. In 2018, Fletcher and Pickard were nominated for "Best Partnership" at the Inside Soap Awards.

== Casting ==
In 2010, Hollyoaks acquired a new series producer, Paul Marquess. He embarked on the show's rejuvenation and axed a number of cast members. Marquess revealed that new characters had been created to compensate for the departures. Following the announcement of the new Sharpe and Costello families, Marquess told an Inside Soap reporter that a third new family would be introduced. The O'Connor family, described as a "four-member Liverpudlian tribe", were announced on 16 June 2010. It was announced that Fletcher had been cast in the role of step-mother of two, Diane. Gary Cargill was cast as Diane's husband, Rob, and Stephanie Davis and Connor Wilkinson were cast as her stepchildren, Sinead and Finn respectively. Of her role, Fletcher said, "I am delighted to be back filming at Lime Pictures where I started my career on Brookside – then Mersey TV. I worked with Paul on Brookside and I'm thrilled and honoured to be working with him again, especially as this is such an exciting time for Hollyoaks." Marquess commented, "We're very excited about the arrival of the O'Connors who burst onto screens in August with a very dramatic story-line. And I'm personally very excited to work with the fantastic Alex Fletcher again." Fletcher began filming her scenes in mid-June. She said working on the show is practical as she does not have to relocate.

== Development ==
=== Characterisation ===
Diane is described as a "loving wife" and a "devoted stepmum". Fletcher told Daniel Kilkelly from Digital Spy that Diane is a good person because she has looked after two children who are not biologically hers. In comparison to Jacqui Dixon, a character Fletcher played in Brookside, Fletcher assessed that Diane "hasn't got so much of a sting in her tail". She added that Diane does not value her career as highly as Jacqui did and Diane is "a lot more sensitive and grown-up". Fletcher described Diane as "a little bit over the top" in her initial stories, but hoped she would become "quite likeable" and relatable. Diane is a marketing worker and is training to work for the local council. Fletcher explained to an OK! magazine reporter that Diane is the "rock of the family", adding that the O'Connor's are not a "dysfunctional family, they're quite normal". Fletcher also told Kilkelly of a great relationship between Diane, Sinead and Finn and loathed Diane becoming "the wicked stepmother". She acknowledged that scenes often become "erring towards" Diane being annoyed with them, but ultimately writers portray her as a good step-parent. In 2012, Fletcher told a reporter from K9 magazine that her own experiences of motherhood helped her to better play the motherly role of Diane. She revealed that Diane is "a really caring person but a bit nosey with it" because she is always keeping "a beady eye on" Sinead.

A writer from the official Hollyoaks website likened Diane to a "professional racing horse" because "she never gets an easy ride" in storylines. They detailed how being tasked with helping Sinead through young adulthood leaves her "worn out". They added that her need to support Sinead and Finn at times "made her unpopular".

=== In vitro fertilisation treatment (2010) ===
Diane becomes desperate to have her own child and undergoes a second round of In vitro fertilisation (IVF) treatment. Fletcher told the Liverpool Echo that she really wanted to get the storyline right because it affects so many people. Fletcher added that she felt she had a "huge responsibility" to do the storyline justice. The actress later explained that Rob is not that keen on having any more children, because he already has children. Rob will do anything for Diane as she "pretty much stepped in and saved his life" with Sinead and Finn. The storyline looks at how Sinead and Finn cope with the pressure and disappointment of IVF and the potential arrival of a new baby brother or sister. Davis stated that Sinead is upset that Diane is desperate for a baby of her own. She said "I think she and her little brother are thinking, 'Well, aren't we good enough for you?' in a way." Davis added that Sinead is against Diane's IVF treatment. Fletcher called the storyline great because "there's just loads of avenues that they could take it down".

Diane's second round of IVF fails and she breaks down. Sinead comforts Diane, but Finn is glad as he "feels if Diane wants a baby it means she doesn't want him". Diane is "desperate" for a baby, and steals a baby boy from the hospital. She goes to the hospital to see a nurse and when she gets there, she finds the baby. Fletcher told a reporter from What's on TV that "the baby has been abandoned outside the hospital. Diane thinks it's an animal at first when she hears something crying – and when she looks it's a baby boy." There is no information left with the baby, so Diane reasons that his mother does not deserve him and takes him home. Fletcher explained that Diane takes the baby home rather than into the hospital because she believes that "she's doing the right thing and that she'll get in touch with social services." But, Diane "goes past the point of no return" and feels a bond with the baby and falls in love with him. Fletcher rationalised Diane's behaviour, stating "she's not a nut job. She's pumped full of hormones and the IVF hasn't worked. She's having a breakdown and she isn't thinking properly." Fletcher recalled of her shock upon discovering Diane would take the baby. She envisioned Diane being "a good woman" and stealing a child out of character until she gained more context within the story. Fletcher defended her character, noting Diane does not "steal a baby, she finds a baby, and that's kind of different."

=== Temporary departure (2016) ===
In March 2016, Fletcher announced that she was pregnant and would be taking maternity leave from the show. This meant that the character had to be written out temporarily and she filmed the exit in May 2016. Diane's exit storyline saw herself and Tony forced to sell their restaurant to Marnie Nightingale (Lysette Anthony) following months of her scheming to ruin the business. Diane and Tony return to working there but are treated unfairly by Marnie. Diane discovers that Marnie is having an affair with her daughter's boyfriend, Freddie Roscoe (Charlie Clapham) and blackmails her. Marnie decides she needs to get rid of Diane and calls an old friend who offers her a job in France, which Diane accepts.

=== Obsessive–compulsive disorder (2021) ===
In 2021, writers explored the mental and behavioural disorder, obsessive–compulsive disorder (OCD) via the character. Announced on 8 April 2021 and promoted as an issue-based storyline, it was confirmed that Diane would develop the common mental health condition. Fletcher described being entrusted with the story "an honour". She explained her intrigue and need to learn more about OCD. She noted that OCD is a widely known issue, but the severity of "how much it can inhibit people's lives" was lesser known. Fletcher believed it was important to make the story factual and publicise the symptoms, especially as the COVID-19 pandemic made OCD more widespread. The pandemic and constant government advice regarding hygiene and precautions made Fletcher unsure whether viewers needed to see such a story. But she noted Hollyoaks never "shy away" from playing current affairs despite their difficulties. Fletcher told Sarah Ellis from Inside Soap that Diane suffered minor OCD symptoms when she was young and that this was added into the character's backstory. Diane had learned to suppress her symptoms until a series of personal traumas trigger her illness.

Hollyoaks production partnered with the mental health charity, OCD-UK to ensure the story was portrayed accurately. Their aim was to get Diane "truly reflect an individual's experience of OCD". OCD-UK worker Kirstie McBryan took an advisory role in the development of Diane's story, in which she liaised with Fletcher and story writers. McBryan distinguished that no televised drama can "fully explore all aspects" of OCD but Diane's story "captures the nuances of OCD as accurately as possible and shows the individual's suffering." Ashley Fulwood from the charity added that OCD is more than cleaning rituals. He explained that untreated OCD rituals can have "devastating consequences". He added that pregnant women's worries "can exacerbate OCD to the point of crisis, to the point of despair, to the point of desperation." He concluded that this was Hollyoaks would explore with Diane and her pregnancy. Hollyoaks decided to portray Diane's obsessive thoughts via voice overs, which was rare in televised OCD stories. These detailed what Diane was thinking, rather than just showing her compulsive behaviours.

Writers used the aftermath of Diane's abusive relationship with Edward Hutchinson (Joe McGann) and her pregnancy to bring on her initial symptoms. Fletcher assessed that Diane loves her family and blames herself for allowing Edward into their lives. She added that Diane "now feels an overwhelming need to protect them all and this comes out as obsessive behaviour, which is so consuming for Diane." Diane's initial symptoms began surfacing the in her behaviour during episodes broadcast in February 2021. These included Diane checking windows and counting to 3, with the addition of reassuring herself nothing bad would happen via a voice over. Stephen Patterson from Metro reported on Diane's behaviour and speculated the show was gearing up towards an OCD storyline. Diane's scenes featured in May 2021 episodes explored her worsening symptoms. Diane covers all of her household furniture in protective sheets and asks Tony if they can go into a COVID style lockdown. Her behaviour worries Tony and her sister-in-law Verity Hutchinson (Eva O'Hara), who then seeks medical advice from doctor Misbah Maalik (Harvey Virdi). Fletcher explained that Tony originally believed Diane's behaviour was caused by hormones. Writers showed Diane using the covid pandemic and her pregnancy to mask her symptoms. Fletcher added "she's really frightened. She's reassuring herself and everyone else that once the baby comes, it's going to be fine. And she's desperate to believe that." Tony realises Diane's condition is worse when following a marriage vow renewal proposal. Diane wraps her furniture in plastic to stop guests contaminating her home, but Verity recognises her symptoms as OCD. Fletcher described her behaviour as "extreme" but "Diane just can't help herself, it makes her feel better and makes the bad thoughts go away."

By August 2021's episodes, writers displayed Diane's symptoms as severe. She becomes convinced a virus is spreading through the village and pours her businesses' alcohol stock away over contamination fears. Diane's extreme compulsions upset Tony, who informs her he cannot cope or help her overcome her illness alone. In addition, Diane contends with her friend, Becky Quentin's (Katie McGlynn) downplaying of her illness. Writers used the development to urge Diane to seeks professional help for the first time and she arranges a hospital consultation. Diane fails to make progress but during the October 2021 episodes, Diane finally begins treatment for her condition after giving birth to her daughter, Eva. She is portrayed as leaving the village temporarily to seek medical treatment, vowing to her family to return with better mental health. Fletcher told Ellis that she hoped Diane's OCD storyline helped viewers struggling with the condition. She added "I hope this storyline can help shake off any stigma" and "will show that it is possible to recover with the right support."

=== Ovarian cancer and departure (2026) ===
On 2 February 2026, it was reported that Fletcher would be leaving the role of Diane after 16 years. Of her departure, a source from Hollyoaks said: "Alex is one of the show's most popular characters both on and off screen – everyone just adores her. She has been at the heart of Hollyoaks alongside Nick for more than a decade and bosses are gutted she's leaving, but they are doing everything they came to come up with a memorable and fitting exit for her much-loved character."

On 2 March 2026, it was announced that Diane would be killed-off after being diagnosed with ovarian cancer. The storyline has been developed in collaboration with Ovarian Cancer Action, with the charity having advised during the writing process. In the press release, the charity states that 75% of affected women are diagnosed with ovarian cancer at an advanced stage: "This storyline has been a completely new challenge for me and something I've never explored before," said Fletcher in a statement. "Unfortunately, in some way or another many of us have been touched by cancer - I know my family certainly has this past year. The storyline can be very relatable. At times it's been difficult to film but I'm glad that Hollyoaks are telling this story and raising awareness about ovarian cancer, with the hope that it encourages people to prioritise their health", Fletcher concluded. In the storyline, Diane's cancer will have metastasised to her lymph nodes, liver, and lungs.

== Storylines ==
Diane completes a round of In vitro fertilisation treatment and takes a pregnancy test, which reveals she is not pregnant. She goes to the hospital to discuss other options for conceiving children and returns with a baby boy. Diane tells her stepdaughter, Sinead, that the baby was abandoned at the hospital. Diane intends to raise the baby, however he becomes ill and Sinead tells nurse, Lynsey Nolan (Karen Hassan). Lynsey discovers the truth but Diane refuses to hand him over. Lynsey threatens to report Diane to the police, but Anita Roy (Saira Choudhry) forces Lynsey to hand the baby over to Diane. Diane learns that teenager, Amber Sharpe (Lydia Lloyd-Henry), is pregnant and planning to terminate her pregnancy. Amber agrees to have the baby and let Diane raise it as her own. Diane discovers that her stepson, Finn, is the father of Amber's baby and tells Amber that she cannot raise the baby.

Eva Strong (Sheree Murphy) wrongly reports Rob to the police for a suspected inappropriate relationship with her daughter, Anita. After Rob is arrested, Diane admits that he was her teacher at school when they began a relationship. When they began a relationship, Rob was married to Sinead and Finn's mother, Morag (Lisa Coleman), who later died. Diane reveals to Sinead that Morag is actually alive. Diane explains that learning of the revelation made her steal the baby from the hospital months earlier. Diane and Rob end their marriage, leaving Diane and Sinead's relationship strained. Diane tries to stop Sinead from seeing her boyfriend, Bart McQueen (Jonny Clarke), after she becomes intoxicated the night before an exam. Diane is angry that Sinead and Bart continue their relationship in secret. Diane finds a note left by Sinead telling her that she and Bart have run away. Diane finds Sinead, but after she insults Bart, Sinead slaps her and refuses to return home. Diane and Sinead reconcile and she agrees to accept her relationship.

Sinead is involved in a bus crash which kills her friends, Diane is left shocked when the nurse reveals that Sinead is pregnant. Diane begins teaching at Hollyoaks College and is completely unaware that Sinead and Ruby Button (Anna Shaffer) are bullying Esther Bloom (Jazmine Franks) following the bus crash. Diane asks Sinead whether she was involved in the bullying and she denies it and blames Ruby. New headteacher Patrick Blake (Jeremy Sheffield) promotes Diane to head of the Anti-Bullying scheme, but she is left shocked when Ruby reveals to Diane that Sinead was also involved in the bullying. Diane and Sinead agree to keep her involvement in the bullying secret but they are exposed via a video taken by Dylan Shaw's (Mikey Riddington-Smith).

Diane has drunken sex with Tony Hutchinson (Nick Pickard) and becomes pregnant. Sinead gives birth to a baby girl, who she calls Katy O'Connor. Diane and Tony begins a relationship and begins restaurant business together, along with Ste Hay (Kieron Richardson), called The Hutch. Diane and Tony visit Brighton and discover that they met when they were children there, before giving birth to twins named Anthony and Dee Dee Hutchinson. Diane is shocked to discover that Sinead has turned to prostitution and forces her to move in with her to recover. Sinead begins a relationship with Freddie Roscoe (Charlie Clapham), and takes baby Katy with her to live with him. Katy becomes ill but a hospital visit confirms nothing wrong with Katy, with nurses believing Sinead is attention seeking. Sinead cuts her own finger and places her blood inside baby Katy's nappy to secure an additional hospital check-up, but Sinead later confesses this to Diane. Diane contacts social services, they place Katy into Diane's care and she bans Sinead from visiting. Diane and Tony prepare to marry, but during the wedding, she is arrested for drug possession, which belong to Trevor Royle (Greg Wood). Diane returns from the police station to find Katy convulsing in her cot, and is attacked by Sinead in the street for not believing her. Sinead is arrested for assault and Diane rushes Katy to the hospital. Diane is then informed that Katy died and Finn reveals that he allowed Sinead to see Katy whilst Diane was in police custody, before Katy was found convulsing. Diane accuses Sinead of poisoning Katy.

Diane bans Sinead from Katy's funeral. Sinead receives Katy's postmortem, which reveals she had an underlying heart condition and was not poisoned. Sinead attends the funeral, slaps Diane and forces everyone to leave the funeral. Diane tries to make amends with Sinead and she eventually forgives Diane. However, Sinead plots revenge on Diane. Diane and Sinead discover Finn has filmed himself attacking Blessing Chambers (Modupe Adeyeye) because she is transgender. Diane refuses to report Finn to the police and deletes the video and implicates Robbie Roscoe (Charlie Wernham) instead. Sinead seduces Tony in her revenge plot against Diane, but she develops genuine feelings for Tony and they begin an affair. Diane is shocked when John Paul McQueen (James Sutton) reveals that Finn raped him and attempted to rape Nancy Hayton (Jessica Fox). Diane supports Finn and her family are subjected to a hate campaign from the McQueen family. During Finn's trial, Diane continues to support Finn. He is eventually found guilty of John Paul's rape. Finn refuses to see Diane and later apologises to John Paul. Ste attempts to steal from The Hutch and injures Diane.

Diane nearly catches Sinead and Tony kissing so they plan a hotel breakaway together. Diane locates Tony at the hotel. A receptionist tells Diane that Tony had checked in with another woman. Tony admits that he is having an affair and Sinead pretends to be at the hotel to confront him. Diane forgives Tony and resumes their wedding plans. Diane discovers Sinead is pregnant and confronts her about the father. Sinead pretends that Daryl (Rhys Howells) is the father, so Diane invites him to her wedding. Diane discovers Daryl and Sinead never had sex and realises that Tony and Sinead are having an affair. Diane embarrasses them both and changes the locks on the flat and The Hutch, seeking support from Lockie Campbell (Nick Rhys). She finds Sinead and Tony kissing and so retaliates by having sex with Lockie. Diane regrets using Lockie and apologises. Lockie's wife Porsche McQueen (Twinnie-Lee Moore) discovers the affair whilst decorating Diane's room. The pair fight and Diane slips and falls out of a window. Diane is taken to hospital and told she had broken her ribs. Tegan Lomax (Jessica Ellis) gives her pain relief and tells she saw a video in which Tegan informs Dee Dee that she is her biological mother. The Gloved Hand Killer (who is Lindsey Butterfield) injects Diane with potassium chloride, the same chemical used to murder others, but Diane is resuscitated and recovers.

Diane discovers that Tegan is Dee Dee's biological mother, and refuses to help Tegan when she needs a bone marrow transplant to cure her leukaemia when Dee Dee is identified as a match. Tony takes Dee Dee to the hospital and gives his consent to allow her bone marrow to be transplanted into Tegan. Tegan recovers and Diane is furious with both Tony and Tegan for their lies. She sees a solicitor and attempts to keep custody of Dee Dee while taking Rose Lomax away from Tegan. However, Tegan persuades Diane to let her continue mothering Rose while Diane and Tony keep Dee Dee. Rose goes missing which results in an extensive police investigation. The local media are convinced Tony is the culprit and Diane is arrested. Scott and Tegan are revealed to be the culprits and continue with their hoax abduction plot. Tegan's sister, Leela does not support her actions and gives Rose to Diane and Tony. Scott begins to poison Diane and she takes vitamins to counteract her symptoms, but they worsen her condition. Tegan takes advantage of Diane's ill health and takes Rose to the dentist. Diane accuses Tegan of abducting Rose again. Diane begins to suspect she is being poisoned and accuses both Tony and Tegan. She attacks Tegan and discovers pills in Tegan's bag and stolen items belonging to Rose. Diane installs a hidden camera in her kitchen which exposes Scott as the mystery poisoner. Diane falls unconscious but Scott saves her life. Sinead leaves the village and Diane eventually forgives Tony, agreeing to marry him again. Diane also agrees to let Rose return to Tegan's care, realising she is destroying her enemy's life.

Diane discovers Scott unconscious after drinking poisoned tea meant for Diane. She accuses Tony again, but Tony is suspicious of Scott and discovers pills in his bedroom. Scott reveals that he poisoned Diane because he felt abandoned by her as a child. Scott reveals his father also had an affair which led to the breakdown of his parents' marriage. Diane convinces Scott to come home with her. Diane's secretly acknowledges she is the woman who had an affair Scott's father. Diane feels responsible for ruining Scott's life. Diane and Tony are later offered a job in France and sell the Hutch to Marnie (Lysette Anthony) and James Nightingale (Gregory Finnegan). Diane and Tony prepare to leave but her stays behind to help his son, Harry deal with his drug addict boyfriend, Ste. Diane returns in the New Year, along with her niece Lily. She suspects Diane is having an affair, not realising Diane has resumed contact with Finn and is helping him secure parole from prison. Tony is furious and confronts her. Diane enlists legal help from James, but as he is John Paul's partner, he works against them. Finn attacks James and is denied parole. Lily discovers that Diane was the one who broke up Scott's family. Scott is rushed to hospital after attempting to commit suicide. Diane confronts Scott, branding him selfish and he discharges himself from the hospital. Scott admits to Diane how unhappy he is and with Diane's support, Scott returns to the hospital.

Diane is furious when Tony confesses to kissing his ex Mandy Richardson (Sarah Jayne Dunn) and furiously slaps her, warning her to stay away from her family. Head teacher Sally St. Claire (Annie Wallace) is suspicious that one of three girls Lily, Peri Lomax (Ruby O Donnell) and Yasmine Maalik (Haeisha Mistry) are self-harming. She calls Diane, Leela Lomax (Kirsty Leigh Porter) and Misbah Maalik (Harvey Virdi) to the school to discuss the situation. They refuse to believe that their daughters might be self harming. Peri tells Sally that the article is fictional, unaware that all three girls are self-harming. Diane is relieved that Lily is okay after an explosion at the school occurs. Peri reveals that her, Yasmine and Lily have been self harming and Tony and Diane confront Lily over this and tell her that she needs help but she denies it. Lily later opens up to them and agrees to stop but secretly self harms behind closed doors.

Diane is shocked that Lily is still self-harming. Lily develops Sepsis and is taken to hospital. Diane comforts Lily, who explains her reasons for self harm and Diane promises to help her. Tony later tells Diane that Harry killed Amy Barnes (Ashley Slanina-Davies). Diane struggles with this secret and tells Amy's husband Ryan Knight (Duncan James) that Harry killed Amy, unaware that Ryan is the actual culprit. Ryan manipulates Diane into telling the police but James blackmails him into letting Harry off. Diane is angry when Tony wants Harry to move back in and gives him an ultimatum. Diane goes to stay with her sister and Tony offers to take her unaware that he is smuggling Harry out of the village. While driving through a tunnel, Diane makes Tony stop after hearing noises in the boot. She opens it and finds Harry inside. Diane tries to call the police whilst standing in the road and is run over by Misbah. Diane allows Harry to run, she recovers but Harry is arrested by the police. Diane has a fight with Leela when she discovers that Lily's boyfriend Prince McQueen (Malique Thompson-Dwyer) has had sex with her daughter, Peri. She mistakenly believed she was pregnant and Diane convinces Peri to lie about a pregnancy to prevent Lily and Prince from reconciling. Lily discovers the truth and decides to marry Prince. Diane becomes determined to ruin their wedding but does not succeed.

Diane is confused when Dee Dee's behaviour changes and takes her to the hospital where it is revealed that she may have autoimmune encephalitis. Dee Dee undergoes treatment, which does not work. Diane reluctantly tells Tegan about Dee Dee's condition and allows her to be involved in her treatment. Tegan suggests taking Dee Dee to Disneyland, but Diane refuses, so Tegan creates a Disney themed party for Dee Dee. Diane cancels the party and Dee Dee tells her she wishes Tegan was her mum. Diane bans Tegan from seeing Dee Dee, who then vows to tell Dee Dee that she is her real mum. The three parents deliberate telling Dee Dee the truth about her parentage, but Tegan ultimately decides against it. When Dee Dee needs dangerous treatment, Diane is reluctant to consent but Tony and Tegan persuade her otherwise. After visiting Dee Dee in the hospital, Tony leaves the village, unable to deal with the heartache. Diane is worried when Tony doesn't return home and decides to report him missing. The police arrive and tell her that they found his phone discarded and all funds have been withdrawn from his account. Diane realises that Tony has abandoned their family and vows to carry on without him.

Diane is conflicted when faced with an optional treatment for Dee Dee that could make her illness worse. Tegan is opposed and seeks legal advice from James. Tony returns and Diane lambasts him for abandoning her but forgives him. James forces Diane and Tegan to tell Dee Dee and Rose the truth about their parentage. Dee Dee is placed into a coma to stop her seizures. When Dee Dee begins to improve, Diane is willing to reconcile with Tony. Hollyoaks village is affected by a storm and Diane and Tony find Rose at the Hutch. Tegan is hit be a falling tree and is rushed to hospital where Diane and Tony tell her that they want to co parent Dee Dee and Rose and Tegan agrees but she dies.

== Reception ==
For her portrayal of Diane, Fletcher was nominated for "Best Soap Actor (Female)" at the 2018 Digital Spy Reader Awards; she came in tenth place with 3.4% of the total votes. Daniel Kilkelly of Digital Spy said he was "pleased" about Fletcher's signing. A writer from Holy Soap recalled Diane's most memorable moment as "getting her step-daughter Sinead to administer her IVF injection when husband Rob was tied up at work." The official Hollyoaks website ran a poll asking viewers which member of the O'Connor family was their favourite. Diane received the most votes, with 1,597 (34.13%) people voting for her. In another poll run by the website, readers were tasked with deciding who was the best mum out of Diane, Myra McQueen (Nicole Barber-Lane) and Martha Kane (Carli Norris). Diane came first with over 3920 votes, totalling over 51% of the vote. In 2018, Fletcher and Pickard were nominated for "Best Partnership" at the Inside Soap Awards. In 2025, Diane and Tony received a "Best Soap Couple" nomination at the Digital Spy Reader Awards. Fletcher was longlisted for "Best Actress" at the 2026 Inside Soap Awards, whilst Diane's death was also longlisted for "Best Exit" and her ovarian cancer was longlisted for "Best Storyline".

A reporter from OK! magazine branded Diane a "confused character", "mixed-up mum" and "headline-grabbing role". They assessed that Diane taking an abandoned baby from the hospital was a "compelling baby-snatch storyline". Anthony D. Langford, writing for AfterElton, opined that Diane is an "atrocious mother" because of her behaviour during Esther's bullying storyline. Langford reasoned that Diane's behaviour resulted from parents always protecting their children. However, he believed Diane needed "to pay the price for her actions". In 2021, prior to Diane's pregnancy being confirmed, Chris Edwards from Digital Spy reported on how fans had speculated that the character was pregnant due to her "strange behaviour".

Sarah Wall from Digital Spy praised Diane's OCD storyline for showing "the reality of the condition and for thinking outside the box." She noted that the use of voice overs was a "powerful tool", that allowed "viewers access to a character's most private thoughts". She called it successful and portrayed the obsessive thoughts of OCD patients better than other shows had done prior. Wall added that the story took viewers "full cycle in her OCD world". Wall also praised the decision to have Diane, a "strong female character" portray the illness, adding "Hollyoaks has demonstrated how mental health disorders can affect anyone at any time in their lives."
