= List of Hollyoaks characters introduced in 2022 =

British television programme character list

Hollyoaks is a British television soap opera that was first broadcast on Channel 4 on 23 October 1995. The following is a list of characters that first appear in the show in 2022, by order of first appearance. All characters are introduced by the programme's executive producer Lucy Allan. Zain Rizwaan (Jonas Khan) and Zoe Anderson (Garcia Brown) made their debut appearances in February. They were followed by Eric Foster (Angus Castle-Doughty), the brother of Tony (Nick Pickard) and Verity Hutchinson (Eva O'Hara). Nadira Valli (Ashling O'Shea), a love interest for Shaq Qureshi (Omar Maalik), began appearing in March, and in April, Glynis Barber joined the cast as gangster Norma Crow. May marked the first appearance of Vicky Grant (Anya Lawrence), a foster child for Scott Drinkwell (Ross Adams), and she was followed by her boyfriend, Joseph Holmes (Olly Rhodes), in June. Matt Lapinskas also made a guest appearance in June as Alex Ramsdan. October saw Jon-Paul Bell cast as Beau Ramsey, the long-lost son of Tony Hutchinson (Nick Pickard). Shing Lin Leong (Izzie Yip) then debuted in December as Honour Chen-Williams' (Vera Chok) niece. Additionally, multiple other characters appeared throughout the year.

== Zain Rizwaan ==
Zain Rizwaan
- Hollyoaks character
- Portrayed by: Jonas Khan
- Duration: 2022–2024
- First appearance: Episode 5791; 21 February 2022
- Last appearance: Episode 6409; 2 July 2024
- Introduced by: Lucy Allan
In-universe information
- Other names: Zain Randeri
- Occupation: Iman
- Wife: Jamila (widowed); Misbah Maalik (2022–present)
- Stepsons: Shaq Qureshi; Imran Maalik; Sami Maalik (adoptive)
- Stepdaughters: Farrah Maalik; Yasmine Cunningham

Zain Rizwaan (also Randeri), played by Jonas Khan, made his first appearance on 21 February 2022. The character and casting was announced on 15 February 2022. Zain is an iman and was introduced to serve as a love interest for Misbah Maalik (Harvey Virdi) when he arrives in the village. Zain was billed as an "agony aunt" for the character and others in the village. On his casting, Khan said that he was excited to join Hollyoaks due to its progressiveness, feeling that the soap "always looks to push boundaries". Of his character, the actor said that he "will look to bring some spirituality and guidance to the Maalik family and rest of the village".

On 8 May 2024, it was announced that Khan would be exiting the role after 2 years. Zain's final scenes aired on 2 July 2024.

== Zoe Anderson ==
Zoe Anderson, played by Garcia Brown, made her first appearance on the episode broadcast on 21 February. Brown auditioned for the role after feeling very low about her career. Zoe was introduced as the granddaughter of Pearl Anderson (Dawn Hope) and the new detective of the Hollyoaks village. Zoe is described as being dedicated to her job and not putting anything above it whilst also loving to party and have fun when not working, with Brown stating that there are two sides to the character. In addition to her work as a detective, Zoe's storylines have included developing a relationship with Sam Chen-Williams (Matthew McGivern), her fractured relationship with her mother Sharon Bailey (Jamelia), discovering she is pregnant, breaking up with Sam and dealing with Sam's obsessive behaviour following their breakup. Zoe was also involved in a knife crime storyline. Brown has said that she enjoys playing the character. For her role as Zoe, Brown was longlisted for "Best Newcomer" at the 2022 Inside Soap Awards.

== Wendy Blissett ==
Wendy Blissett
- Hollyoaks character
- Portrayed by: Jennifer Armour
- First appearance: Episode 5800; 4 March 2022
- Last appearance: Episode 5877; 21 June 2022
- Introduced by: Lucy Allan
In-universe information
- Father: Silas Blissett
- Sisters: Heidi Costello
- Grandmothers: Nancy Blissett
- Aunts: Trish Minniver
- Nephews: Riley Costello; Seth Costello; Jason Costello
- First cousins: Mitzeee Minniver; Maxine Minniver
- Other relatives: Bobby Costello; Phoenix Costello; Minnie Minniver

Wendy Blissett, played by Jennifer Armour, made her first appearance on 4 March 2022. She was introduced as the daughter of Silas Blissett (Jeff Rawle) and the great-aunt of Bobby Costello (Jayden Fox). She is invited to the village by Mercedes McQueen (Jennifer Metcalfe) when she believes that Bobby has been speaking to her through an app. Although at first appearing wanting to help Mercedes with Bobby, even stopping her from taking cocaine, it is eventually revealed she is actually working with Silas to take Bobby away from the McQueen family. Wendy departs on 21 June 2022. She is then killed off-screen in a suspicious road traffic accident, with it being heavily implied that Silas had something to do with it.

Speaking to Inside Soap, Armour teased: "Her motives and willingness to please Silas will be explained, as there is an emotional element to the relationship with her father yet to come to light. Things will get scary!" Jennifer also explained her rivalry with Mercedes: "Every time she feels any sympathy, Mercedes proves her wrong by showing what Wendy believes to be her true colours... Mercedes wants to demonstrate she's devoted to her son, but with Wendy subtly manipulating her, she gets stressed and it comes to a head. Mercedes loses it and Wendy knows she can use that against her. She has convinced Bobby that Mercedes isn't happy with him and they'd be better off living separately. It's horrible!"

== Eric Foster ==
Eric Foster
- Hollyoaks character
- Portrayed by: Angus Castle-Doughty
- Duration: 2022–2023
- First appearance: Episode 5802; 8 March 2022
- Last appearance: Episode 6108; 10 May 2023
- Introduced by: Lucy Allan
In-universe information
- Father: Edward Hutchinson
- Mother: Charlotte Hutchinson
- Sisters: Verity Hutchinson
- Half-brothers: Tony Hutchinson; Dom Reilly
- Half-sisters: Eva Hutchinson
- Nephews: Harry Thompson; Beau Ramsey; Anthony Hutchinson
- Nieces: Grace Hutchinson; Rose Lomax; Morgan Osborne; Dee Dee Hutchinson (adoptive)

Eric Foster, played by Angus Castle-Doughty, made his first appearance on 8 March 2022. Eric is the estranged brother of established characters Tony (Nick Pickard) and Verity Hutchinson (Eva O'Hara), and Verity welcomes the socially awkward Eric into the village. It was confirmed that Eric's arrival would kick off a new storyline for the family, with their dynamic set to be examined. Speaking about joining the show, Castle-Doughty said: "From the moment I started, I've felt really welcomed into the fold. Eva and I clicked straight away – we've had many discussions about our characters' relationship. Eric's upcoming storyline is topical, important, and one which hasn't been covered in soap before, and we are working really hard to do it justice."

On 9 May 2023, it was confirmed that Castle-Doughty would be exiting Hollyoaks. Eric's final scenes aired on 10 May 2023.

In 2024, Daniel Kilkelly from Digital Spy opined that Eric's incel plot was one of the "occasional highlights" of the soap's "stale and boring" recent years.

== Freya Calder ==
Freya Calder, played by Ellie Henry, is the daughter of Carter Shepherd (David Ames) and Lexi Calder (Natalie Anderson) and is a student at Hollyoaks High. Freya made her initial first appearance in episode 5813 first originally broadcast on 23 March 2022. On 3 July 2024, it was announced that Henry would be leaving Hollyoaks. Freya's final scenes aired on 15 July 2024.

== Nadira Valli ==
Nadira Valli
- Hollyoaks character
- Portrayed by: Ashling O'Shea
- Duration: 2022–2024
- First appearance: Episode 5815; 25 March 2022
- Last appearance: Episode 6285; 10 January 2024
- Introduced by: Lucy Allan
In-universe information
- Occupation: Matchmaker
- Father: Kamal Valli
- Grandmothers: Aleeza Valli

Nadira Valli, played by Ashling O'Shea, made her first appearance on 25 March 2022. She was introduced as a love interest for Shaq Qureshi (Omar Maalik), his old childhood friend and classmate. The pair rekindle their connection at a matchmaking event led by Nadira. Digital Spy's Jess Bacon wrote that Nadira is a feisty, fun and assertive character and hinted that she would be able to "hold her own" against Shaq. Speaking more about Nadira, O'Shea said: "She has a huge heart, a sarcastic mouth and a lot going on in her mind right now... I can't wait for people to get to know her." Of her casting, she said: "Joining Hollyoaks has been such a surreal experience. I've grown up watching the show, and their hard-hitting storylines, so it's a privilege as an actor to be able to be a part of that legacy." O'Shea said that the majority of her scenes had been with Maalik, whom she had formed a close friendship with during her time on set. She said that they clicked from the moment they had met, which she felt was beneficial for their scenes since the characters have known each other for years.

It was later confirmed that Nadira would have a sexuality arc, with her realising that she is attracted to women after kissing Juliet Nightingale (Niamh Blackshaw), a client of hers. O'Shea said that Nadira feels awful about kissing Juliet since she wants to help fix Juliet's relationship with her fiancée, Peri Lomax (Ruby O'Donnell). On her character telling her family about her sexuality, O'Shea explained: "For all she knows they might embrace her. Nadira is scared of bringing shame and knows it can be hard to live authentically as a queer person in today's society." Nadira is further stressed after Shaq proposes to her, which Nadira feels is "completely out of the blue – though once she rationalises it she realises it could make a lot of sense." The situation becomes more confusing for Nadira when Shaq's ex-girlfriend, Verity Hutchinson (Eva O'Hara), becomes involved.

== Norma Crow ==
Norma Crow
- Hollyoaks character
- Portrayed by: Glynis Barber
- Duration: 2022–2024
- First appearance: Episode 5840; 29 April 2022
- Last appearance: Episode 6427; 26 July 2024
- Introduced by: Lucy Allan
In-universe information
- Other names: The Undertaker
- Sons: Warren Fox
- Daughters: Katy Fox
- Grandsons: Joel Dexter; Sebastian Blake
- Granddaughters: Ella Richardson; Sophie Blake; Maria-Gabriella Fox-McQueen
- Other relatives: Noah Dexter

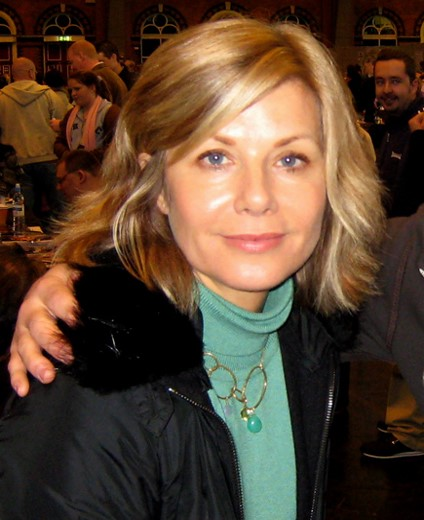
Glynis Barber portrays Norma.

Norma Crow, played by Glynis Barber, made her first appearance on 29 April 2022. Norma is a gangster who makes her first appearance in a hearse looking for someone who has been stealing her money. Speaking about joining the show, Barber said: "I'm really excited to be playing Norma as she's an amazing character. Formidable, complex and taking on the men and leaving them quaking in their boots. The team and cast at Hollyoaks have been incredibly welcoming and I can't wait to get my teeth into the character."

Talking to the Radio Times about her role, Barber said that Norma is her most evil character yet and that everyone is scared of her. She admitted that she did not expect to appear on Hollyoaks and that she had turned down roles on the soap in the past due to the roles "not grabbing [her] enough that [she would] want to commit". However, she felt that Norma would be a captivating role and was glad to have taken it, and joked that driving around in a hearse is an unusual mode of transport. Barber said that despite Hollyoaks having numerous villains, they are "small fry" in comparison to Norma since she has a large criminal empire with contacts and informers situated everywhere. She added: "Nothing gets past her and she will spot a weakness and exploit it. Norma is very smart and never wings it. Something she says early on is: 'Always do your research,' if you cross her, she'll find out everything there is to know about you and use it to her advantage. I've yet to see a soft side and I'm not sure there is one. In her business she can't afford to drop her guard for a second or she'll be killed. The reasons she chose this path will become apparent and people will be shocked at the decisions she's made."

On 6 June 2024 it was announced that Norma would be leaving Hollyoaks. Norma's final scenes aired on 26 July 2024, where she was murdered by the Gangster Blue.

== Vicky Grant ==
Vicky Grant
- Hollyoaks character
- Portrayed by: Anya Lawrence
- Duration: 2022–present
- First appearance: Episode 5841; 2 May 2022
- Introduced by: Lucy Allan
- Spin-off appearances: Hollyoaks Later (2025)
In-universe information
- Occupation: Student; Barmaid
- Father: Mick Johnson
- Mother: Caitlin Grant
- Adoptive father: Scott Drinkwell (foster)
- Half-brothers: Andre Clark; Leo Johnson
- Half-sisters: Gemma Johnson
- Uncles: Ellis Johnson
- Other relatives: Frank Johnson; Jerome Johnson

Vicky Grant, played by Anya Lawrence, made her first appearance on 2 May 2022. Vicky is the foster daughter of Scott Drinkwell (Ross Adams), but the pair struggle to bond with Scott having expected a younger child. Vicky has been billed as "headstrong and forthright" by show bosses, but they teased that a softer side may emerge after she takes a liking to one villager.

Speaking about joining the show, Lawrence said: "Vicky is a whirlwind! She has had a really difficult start in life and is trying to find a place where she can fit in. I have come to love her, she is fierce and vulnerable, and those two contrasting characteristics make her fun to play. I am so excited to watch her develop and grow. Who knows what she will be up to next!"

On 8 February 2023, it was announced that Lawrence had departed Hollyoaks and her final scenes aired on 9 February 2023. Lawrence made two further appearances on 23 and 24 February 2023, and on 20 March 2023, it was confirmed that Vicky would be returning to the series on a full-time basis. It was announced on 24 November 2023, that her on-screen half-brother Andre Clark (David Joshua-Anthony) was set to make his first appearance in late 2023 for her own respective storyline.

== Joseph Holmes ==
Joseph Holmes
- Hollyoaks character
- Portrayed by: Olly Rhodes
- First appearance: Episode 5864; 2 June 2022
- Last appearance: Episode 5957; 11 October 2022
- Introduced by: Lucy Allan
In-universe information
- Occupation: Student
- Mother: Gill Holmes

Joseph Holmes, played by Olly Rhodes, made his first appearance on 2 June 2022. Joseph is the boyfriend of Vicky Grant (Anya Lawrence), and his arrival started a new issues-based storyline, with show bosses teasing that his "explosive nature" will lead to consequences around the village. Joseph arrives in the village hoping to reconcile with Vicky after not hearing from her following her becomes the foster daughter of Scott Drinkwell (Ross Adams).

Speaking about his character, Rhodes said: "I'm so excited about joining Hollyoaks, it's been a great experience. Everyone is so welcoming and friendly. My character Joseph has a lot in store for the village, he's a very interesting character to be playing, and will keep you guessing his next move at every turn."

== Alex Ramsden ==
Alex Ramsden
- Hollyoaks character
- Portrayed by: Matt Lapinskas
- Appears in: Episode 5868; 8 June 2022
- Introduced by: Lucy Allan

Alex Ramsden, played by Matt Lapinskas, appeared on 8 June 2022. Alex appeared in an episode that was specially filmed in Mallorca. On his casting, Lapinskas told the Hollyoaks TikTok page, "I am really looking forward to joining the cast of Hollyoaks in the beautiful weather! The cast have been amazing, and it is a privilege to come out to Mallorca and be a part of Hollyoaks. It has been a dream to come and work for Hollyoaks, it has been an amazing experience so far. Just being on the beaches and looking out and thinking 'wow, this is our work environment' is something special". On his character, Lapinskas added, "Alex is a bit of a wheeler dealer, who has come over here [Mallorca] to find his fortune, which he has done. He meets the boys down here and runs a tour guide, so he takes them on their experience after they get scammed by someone, so he pulls them in, but there's a lot more than meets the eye... and he's very charming, very approachable, and that's what the boys see in him, but things take a little turn for the worse, but you'll have to wait and see what happens...".

Following his one-episode appearance, Lapinskas spoke with producers about his character's potential future on the series. He said that the meeting went "really well" and that there was potential of him returning. However, he confirmed that nothing was set, with Lapinskas continuing to audition for and book roles in other projects.

== Morgan Osborne ==
Morgan Osborne
- Hollyoaks character
- Portrayed by: Penelope (2022–2023); Lottie-Rose Mulhall (2025–)
- Duration: 2022–present
- First appearance: Episode 5658; 8 June 2022
- Introduced by: Lucy Allan
In-universe information
- Family: Osborne
- Father: Tony Hutchinson
- Mother: Nancy Hayton
- Adoptive father: Darren Osborne
- Stepmother: Diane Hutchinson
- Siblings: Phoenix Hathaway (adoptive)
- Half-brothers: Beau Ramsey; Harry Thompson; Anthony Hutchinson; Ro Hutchinson; Oscar Osborne; Charlie Dean (adoptive)
- Half-sisters: Grace Hutchinson; Dee Dee Hutchinson (adoptive); Eva Hutchinson (adoptive)
- Grandfathers: Edward Hutchinson; Charles Hayton
- Grandmothers: Margaret Hayton; Victoria Hutchinson
- Uncles: Dominic Reilly; Eric Foster
- Aunts: Becca Hayton; Verity Hutchinson; Eva Hutchinson
- Nephews: Isaac Thompson
- First cousins: Charlie Dean

Morgan Osborne is the daughter of Tony Hutchinson (Nick Pickard) and Nancy Osborne (Jessica Fox) and was born in episode 5658, originally transmitted and broadcast on 8 June 2022. The character temporarily departed the serial alongside Nancy in episode 6075, originally broadcast on 24 March 2023 before returning again on in episode 6288, originally broadcast on 15 January 2024. In a shocking twist on the episode aired on 8 September 2025 it was revealed that Darren was not the father of Morgan as she was Blood Type A and Darren was Blood Type B and Nancy was Blood Type O, it was revealed in the same episode that Tony Hutchinson was the father.

It was initially reported on 16 March 2023 by Digital Spy that Darren and Nancy would receive "devastating" news about baby Morgan, who is set to be diagnosed with circulatory problems. She needs a surgery that requires Nancy to travel to America for. This prompts Nancy's departure (Fox was set to go on maternity leave). Unbeknownst to the family, Frankie Osborne (Isabelle Smith) is being sexually abused by her twin brother JJ Osborne (Ryan Mulvey). At a desperate attempt to retain Nancy to her bedroom at night, she overdoses Morgan on antihistamines to keep her sedated so she would not wake up to interrupt Nancy, however Morgan is discovered by Darren severely ill and choking on her vomit, an incident that was initially reported on 7 May 2024. Later, Nancy asks Frankie if she knows anything about the incident, to which JJ tells her it was Oscar Osborne (Noah Holdsworth).

== Aleeza Valli ==
Aleeza Valli, portrayed by former EastEnders actress Indira Joshi, is the grandmother of Nadira Valli (Ashling O'Shea). Joshi's casting was announced on 17 August 2022 and she appeared in two episodes airing on 24 and 25 August 2022 as a guest at her wedding to Shaq Qureshi (Omar Malik). Upon casting, Aleeza's exact relation to Nadira wasn't revealed, but she appeared in photos sat among other wedding guests. Stephen Patterson reported: "Indira, 80, is perhaps best known to soap fans as EastEnders Mariam Ahmed, a role she played for almost two years."

== Gill Holmes ==
Gill Holmes
- Hollyoaks character
- Portrayed by: Angela Lonsdale
- First appearance: Episode 5928; 31 August 2022
- Last appearance: Episode 5969; 27 October 2022
- Introduced by: Lucy Allan
In-universe information
- Sons: Joseph Holmes
- Adoptive daughters: Vicky Grant (foster)

Gill Holmes, portrayed by Angela Lonsdale, is mother of Joseph Holmes (Olly Rhodes) and former foster mother of Vicky Grant (Anya Lawrence). Lonsdale's casting was announced on 29 August 2022 and she made her first appearance on 31 August 2022. Joseph recently murdered Saul Reeves (Chris Charles) and Felix's son, DeMarcus Westwood (Tomi Ade) had been arrested for it so he and Scott Drinkwell (Ross Adams) pose as a married couple looking to buy her home. Scott keeps Gill distracted while Felix searches the home for evidence against Joseph, and Gill ends up buying into their ploy.

Stephen Patterson from the Metro newspaper reported: "Angela will play an important part in the storyline, as Gill goes to extreme lengths to defend her child." Lonsdale spoke about being part of the storyline: "I can't wait for the viewers to see this important storyline unfold over the next few months."

== Beau Ramsey ==
Beau Ramsey, played by Jon-Paul Bell, made his first appearance on 20 October 2022. The character and casting was announced on 6 September 2022. Further details about the character haven't been shared, but speaking about his casting, Bell said: "Working on Hollyoaks has been an incredible experience and I'm so honoured to be a part of the passionate, creative, hard-working team here. I can't wait for viewers to meet Beau and follow him on his exciting new journey into the village, where he is sure to cause a stir for various well-known characters along the way." In June 2024, it was announced that Bell would be leaving the serial.

== Shing Lin Leong ==
Shing Lin Leong
- Hollyoaks character
- Portrayed by: Izzie Yip
- Duration: 2022–2024
- First appearance: Episode 6001; 12 December 2022
- Last appearance: Episode 6300; 31 January 2024
- Introduced by: Lucy Allan
In-universe information
- Father: Meng Chye Leong
- Mother: Mei Lian Chen
- Aunts: Honour Chen-Williams
- First cousins: Mason Chen-Williams; Serena Chen-Williams; Lizzie Chen-Williams (adoptive)

Shing Lin Leong, played by Izzie Yip, made her first appearance on 12 December 2022. The character and casting was announced on 25 November 2022. Shing is the niece of Honour Chen-Williams (Vera Chok) and she arrives in the village alongside her parents, Mei Lian (Stacy Liu) and Meng Chye Leong (Nicholas Goh) after Mason Chen-Williams (Frank Kauer) starts facing difficulties. However, it has been teased that a family secret will be revealed, completely changing Shing's life. It was revealed to be that Shing's mother had lost their life savings, meaning that Shing could no longer afford to attend boarding school and instead live with the Chen-Williams. The character was billed as "confident, excitable and care-free" and it was said that she is "sure to be a handful as she becomes the life of the party amongst the Hollyoaks teens."

The role is Yip's first professional acting credit, and speaking about the role, she said: "I'm really grateful to be joining the Chen-Williams family. The teens and I have been working on some pretty fun scenes; we're so excited for you to see our characters grow and watch the dynamics of a certain relationship shift around Shing Lin's intrusion. She's going to bring a touch of East Asian familiarity to your screens."

== Other characters ==
Character	Original broadcast date(s)	Actor	Details
Cassie	3–4 January, 7 July	Lizzie Lomas	A patient treated by Misbah Maalik (Harvey Virdi) who claims she fell at a nightclub. However, when Misbah notices some bruising on her thighs, Cassie admits that she was sexually assaulted. Cassie later approaches Misbah and thanks her for the support she gave her, telling her that she brought charges against her attacker.
Keith	5 January–4 May	Geraint Rhys Edwards	A social worker sent to assess whether Scott Drinkwell (Ross Adams) would be an appropriate foster parent. Although Scott impresses Keith, Scott worries about the effect a child might have on his aunt, Diane Hutchinson's (Alex Fletcher) OCD, so he tells Keith he does not believe he would be a good fit. Scott lies to Diane and says he wasn't allowed because of his history with depression, leading Diane to confront Keith where he tells her what happened. Keith later introduces Scott to Vicky Grant (Anya Lawrence) and gives Scott advice when he struggles with bonding with her.
Hannah	18 January, 16 February	Susan Jayne-Robinson	A social worker for Henry Quentin, who is called by James Nightingale (Gregory Finnegan) after Becky Quentin (Katie McGlynn) is arrested under suspicion of causing the fire at the cafe. The social worker doesn't take Henry away from Becky after finding out she was released without charge but urges her to co-operate with the system. Hannah is later called again by Oliver Morgan (Gabriel Clark) after he falls ill from some medicine Becky gave him.
Mike	7-28 February	Kieran Hall	A social worker who visits Mercedes McQueen (Jennifer Metcalfe) after concerns are raised about Bobby Costello (Jayden Fox). Although the social worker is satisfied that Bobby's ankle injury was an accident, he tells Mercedes he believes the family would benefit from regular visits, however she orders him away. When Mike arrives for the visit, he is impressed by Mercedes, but after she has arguments with Theresa McQueen (Jorgie Porter) and Goldie McQueen (Chelsee Healey) he becomes concerned about Bobby's home environment.
DJ Bez	10 February	Himself	A DJ booked by Tony Hutchinson (Nick Pickard) to perform at The Dog in the Pond public house, however when he is instead poached by Damon Kinsella (Jacob Roberts), who poses as Tony.
Luis	22 February–3 March	Ben Wiggins	A sex worker who flirts with John Paul McQueen (James Sutton) after watching him exercise with Olivia Bradshaw (Emily Burnett). When Olivia pulls out of drinks with John Paul, Luis approaches him, and they spend the night together. Luis leaves the next morning but gives John Paul his number. John Paul calls him when he believes Luis has stolen from him, but James Nightingale (Gregory Finnegan) vouches for him. John Paul and Olivia apologise to Luis, and he spends the night with John Paul again, but John Paul is surprised when he learns that Luis is a sex worker and that he would have to pay for their time together. John Paul kicks him out following the revelation, leading Luis to confront him the day after where he demands double payment. James later brings Luis out as a plus one for a night out, but when Luis expresses concern about how James is acting, he's ordered away.
Paramedic	25 February	Millen Brown	A paramedic who treats DeMarcus Westwood (Tomi Ade) after he collapses due to alcohol poisoning.
Jeremy	3 March–9 June	Joseph Beattie	A man that meets James Nightingale (Gregory Finnegan) on a night out when he is celebrating. Jeremy and his boyfriend Raphael (Matt Mella) encourage his reckless activities and after he wins big, they drug and rob him. Jeremy later meets with Juliet Nightingale (Niamh Blackshaw) and kidnaps her, holding her to ransom unless James pays. When James learns it is Jeremy who has kidnapped her, he informs the police of his location. In a flashback, Jeremy is seen gambling with James with again, and off-screen kills Raphael when he learns that he and James have slept together. James is later revealed to be working with Jeremy and visits him in prison.
Raphael	3 March, 4 April	Matt Mella	A man that meets James Nightingale (Gregory Finnegan) on a night out when he is celebrating. Raphael and his boyfriend Jeremy (Joseph Beattie) encourage his reckless activities and after he wins big, they drug and rob him. In a flashback, Raphael and Jeremy gamble with James again, which leads to Raphael and James sleeping together. When Jeremy finds out about this, he murders Raphael off-screen and attempts to frame James.
Sonographer	4 March	Amy Searles	A sonographer for Ella Richardson (Erin Palmer) who conducts a scan on her. During the scan, the sonographer is unable to find a heartbeat for Ella's baby and informs her that the baby has died.
Derek	8 March	Mark Gillis	A man that Misbah Maalik (Harvey Virdi) meets on a dating app and agrees to go on a date with. Before she arrives, Derek is sexist towards Theresa McQueen (Jorgie Porter) and Misbah becomes uneasy during their date, prompting him to berate her before she storms out.
Clara	11–15 March	Eleanor Kirby	A runner who is friends with Serena Chen-Williams (Emma Lau) who approaches Sid Sumner (Billy Price) to ask for drugs, recognising him as her former dealer. Sid refuses to deal to her, but Clara threatens to tell his girlfriend Lizzie Chen-Williams (Lily Best) about his past. Sid later meets with Clara, but tries getting her help instead. Clara later manages to source some drugs, but then has to call for help after Serena drinks from her bottle which contained them. She is scared away by the person who supplied her with the drugs, Ethan Williams (Matthew James-Bailey) after he learns that Serena will no longer be able to compete at the Commonwealth Games because of the drugs. Serena later meets with Clara to get some drugs, hoping to use them to impress her trainer.
Dylan Barker	16–17 March	Max Rinehart	The boyfriend of Lisa Hunter (Gemma Atkinson) who confronts Zara Morgan (Kelly Condron) for abandoning him and Lisa during an illegal protest in Thailand. During a debate, he feeds Tony Hutchinson (Nick Pickard) this information, derailing Zara's campaign. After Lisa encourages Zara to accompany her to a protest against blood diamonds, Dylan unleashes a smoke bomb and frames Zara, leaving her to be arrested.
Gang Leader	18 March	Daniel Campbell	A gang leader who steals prescription drugs from Ethan Williams (Matthew James-Bailey) after he pulls off a heist against them. Warren Fox (Jamie Lomas) witnesses the robbery and offers to help Ethan get the load back. Warren and Ethan track down the gang, and when they're confronted, Warren scares the leader off by firing a gun in the air.
Anna	23 March	Suzanne Collins	A client for Verity Hutchinson (Eva O'Hara) after she opens a divorce forum.
PC Leonard	25 March	Simon Naylor	A police officer who performs a breathalyser test on John Paul McQueen (James Sutton) after he crashes a school minibus.
Benji Jones	11 April	Adam Scotland	A drug dealer who meets with Ethan Williams (Matthew James-Bailey) and Sienna Blake (Anna Passey), where Sienna recognises him as one of her old students. When Benji attempts to ask for a price higher than what Ethan wanted to pay, Sienna intimidates him into giving them the stock for half the price.
Keenan	15–18 April	Benjamin Chandler	An electrician that Joel Dexter (Rory Douglas-Speed) witnesses roughing someone up. When Joel goads Keenan, he is attacked by the group, with Keenan knocking Joel to the ground with a punch. When Joel sees Keenan again, he attacks him, prompting Joel's father Warren Fox (Jamie Lomas) to pull off him off Keenan.
Security Guard	20 April	Tony Marshall	A security guard at a museum that Mercedes McQueen (Jennifer Metcalfe) and Goldie McQueen (Chelsee Healey) visit in an attempt to meet up with Bobby Costello (Jayden Fox). They initially trick the security guard into believing they're re-enactment actors, but once he is tipped off by Wendy Blissett (Jennifer Armour), he orders them off of the property.
Asher	25 April–2 May	Joe Mallalieu	An accountant for Ethan Williams (Matthew James-Bailey) who is approached by Sienna Blake (Anna Passey) and Ste Hay (Kieron Richardson) in order to hide the money that they are siphoning off of Ethan. Ehtan confronts Ste and Sienna after going into hiding as Ethan believes him to be stealing money and commands the pair to pay back the money that he had hidden for them. Asher is in the company of Norma Crow (Glynis Barber) when she arrives, but she later shoots and kills Asher, revealing him to be a police informant.
Girl 1	3 May	Elisha Kerai	Two young girls who bully a young Nadira Valli (Sophia Hussain) in an old home video.
Girl 2	3 May	Inaaya Imambaccass	Two young girls who bully a young Nadira Valli (Sophia Hussain) in an old home video.
Frank	18 May	Stephen Agnew	An old client of Donna-Marie Quinn (Lucy-Jo Hudson) who she and Mercedes McQueen (Jennifer Metcalfe) plan to scam in order to pay off Wendy Blissett (Jennifer Armour). Their plan is initially successful, but Wendy interrupts, prompting Frank to leave.
Judge	19 May	Corinne Wicks	A judge who awards custody of Bobby Costello (Jayden Fox) to Wendy Blissett (Jennifer Armour).
Bruce	20–23 May	Bailey Patrick	A prison guard who James Nightingale (Gregory Finnegan) falls into debt with when in prison. After James is released, Bruce calls him multiple times before confronting him in person to get the money that he's owed. When Ste Hay (Kieron Richardson) sees Bruce confronting James, he arranges to meet Bruce, before scaring him off because of his links to Norma Crow (Glynis Barber).
Dr. Walker	20 May	Anna Bolton	A prosecutor and friend of James Nightingale (Gregory Finnegan) who he gets to pose as a therapist and hold a fake group therapy session for his family.
Kamal Valli	31 May–25 August	Amerjit Deu	The father of Nadira Valli (Ashling O'Shea) who is invited to the village to celebrate her engagement to Shaq Qureshi (Omar Malik). However, when Kamal arrives, it is revealed that he knew nothing of the engagement. When Shaq worries about Nadira's lack of openness, Kamal consoles him and offers to help pay for the wedding. Kamal is one of the guests at Shaq and Nadira's wedding and is shocked to learn about her sexuality, although he ultimately supports her.
Chesney Hawkes	6 June	Himself	A singer booked by Luke Morgan (Gary Lucy) for Darren Osborne (Ashley Taylor Dawson) and Nancy Osborne's (Jessica Fox) wedding.
Spanish Doctor	9 June	Paula Rodriguez	A doctor who treats Luke Morgan (Gary Lucy) after he suffers a fall during his stag-do celebrations in Mallorca. She later tells his fiancée Cindy Cunningham (Stephanie Waring) that there are no more treatment options for him.
Driver	21 June	Michael Schofield	A driver that bundles Wendy Blissett (Jennifer Armour) into a car when she fails to take Bobby Costello (Jayden Fox) away from the rest of the McQueens.
Jazzy	24 June	Taraash Mehrotra	A wedding planner hired for Nadira Valli (Ashling O'Shea), however when he attempts to get her to go over the planned budget and insults Peri Lomax (Ruby O'Donnell) and Juliet Nightingale (Niamh Blackshaw), she fires him.
Julian King	27–29 June, 7 October	Robert Irons	A lawyer for Ali Shahzad (Raji James). Julian encourages Ali to pick up an injury before his court trial, believing it will make the jury more sympathetic towards him. After the trial collapses, Julian tries warning Ali off from, using his statement to the media to attack his accusers. Julian is hired to defend Joseph Holmes (Olly Rhodes), succeeding in getting him bailed.
Dawn	30 June–6 July	Marcia Lecky	A member of the hospital board who reinstates Ali Shahzad (Raji James) as a doctor following the collapse of a rape trial against him. After Ali performs a surgery he was unsuited for, Dawn places him on leave, until he claims he has PTSD. When she is confronted over this by Misbah Maalik (Harvey Virdi), she places her on leave. Dawn is present during the medical tribunal against Ali.
Aofie	1 July	Steph Parry	A cancer patient who refuses treatment from Ali Shahzad (Raji James) due to the accusations against him. When he tries to argue that he was acquitted, she cites the words of his accusers and how he is looked at by other staff members as her reasoning.
Nigel	6 July	Luis Soto	The man in charge of the medical tribunal against Ali Shahzad (Raji James). Ali attempts to use their old friendship to his advantage, but during the tribunal, Misbah Maalik (Harvey Virdi) reads out her rape statement, angering Ali. Ali's outburst prompts Nigel to order him out of the room, and he calls security after Ali refuses. Although he doesn't give her the results of the tribunal, Nigel informs Misbah that she is unlikely to encounter Ali again.
Babs	7 July	Denise Hope	A drug dealer and old friend of Norma Crow (Glynis Barber), who locks Sienna Blake (Anna Passey) and Warren Fox (Jamie Lomas) in the back of a van during a deal.
Returning Officer	12 July	Caroline Chesworth	The returning officer for the Hollyoaks Council election, who announces Tony Hutchinson (Nick Pickard) as the winning candidate.
Stuart	8 August	Gavin James	A man who James Nightingale (Gregory Finnegan) falsely testifies against under the orders of Norma Crow (Glynis Barber). In a flashback, Stuart begs James not to testify, but James coldly rejects his offer. James reveals to Ste Hay (Kieron Richardson) and Romeo Nightingale (Owen Warner) that Stuart later committed suicide.
Associate	16 August	Mark Smalley	An associate of Warren Fox (Jamie Lomas) who he hires to kill Sienna Blake (Anna Passey). However, when she arrives with Ste Hay (Kieron Richardson), he is unable to carry out the task.
Les the Embalmer	17 August–15 November	Tony Mooney	A hitman in the employ of Norma Crow (Glynis Barber) that she sends after Sienna Blake (Anna Passey). However, the Embalmer mistakes Sienna's sister, Liberty Savage (Jessamy Stoddart) for her and feigns a head injury to get her attention. Liberty takes him back inside and mistakenly gives him some of the tea that Sienna had spiked, weakening him. He then attacks Liberty, but Sienna and Warren Fox (Jamie Lomas) arrive, with Warren throwing him out the door. After learning that James Nightingale (Gregory Finnegan) has betrayed him, Norma has The Embalmer take photos of him. When Norma is in hospital, Sienna attempts to kill her, but expecting someone to make a move, Norma sets a trap and is ambushed by the Embalmer when she enters the room. He prepares to kill Sienna in an underground bunker at Norma's home, but Ethan Williams (Matthew James-Bailey) finds them in time and knocks him out. Les grows tried of the way Norma is treating him and rebels, kidnapping her and locking her in a coffin. When Warren and Grace Black (Tamara Wall) arrive, Warren is able to talk Godfrey into betraying Les, knocking the gun out of his hand. As Les and Warren struggle for the gun, Warren shoots and kills Les.
Leo Jacobsen	19 August–9 September	Ben Onwukwe	An elderly man in a retirement village, who Joel Dexter (Rory Douglas-Speed) did sermons for. Leo loaned Joel his car, which Joel used to run down Warren Fox (Jamie Lomas), and Leo tells Sienna Blake (Anna Passey) and Ethan Williams (Matthew James-Bailey) about the loan when Sienna arranges for them to meet. Sienna later arranges for Leo to visit the village in order to expose Joel's secret, however Joel first meets with Leo. When Leo suffers a heart attack, Joel considers leaving him to die, but ultimately saves his life.
Owen Murphy	24 August	Emilio Doorgasingh	A man who falls into debt with Norma Crow (Glynis Barber) and as a result is forced to sign over all of his properties, rendering him homeless.
Conor	29–30 August	Rory McClane	A young man sent to the young offenders' institution for shoplifting and befriends DeMarcus Westwood (Tomi Ade). admitting that he has a spice addiction. When Conor comes into trouble, DeMarcus offers himself instead to prevent Conor from getting killed.
Rueben	29 August–3 October	Billy Winter	A prison at the youth offenders' institution who makes a business smuggling phones in. He attempts to recruit both DeMarcus Westwood (Tomi Ade) and Conor (Rory McClane), threatening Conor's life if DeMarcus doesn't help smuggle spice in. DeMarcus later reports Rueben to a prison guard.
Gary	30 August	Will Tristram	A prison guard who DeMarcus Westwood (Tomi Ade) reports Rueben (Billy Winter) to after he threatens the life of another inmate to get DeMarcus' help in smuggling spice into the young offenders' institution.
Mick	6 September	Roy Brandon	A friend of Silas Blissett (Jeff Rawle) who poses as the serial killer and is arrested in order to tell Mercedes McQueen (Jennifer Metcalfe) that Silas will be returning. Silas pulls some strings to get Mick released from prison, but after divulging his plan, he kills Mick by poisoning him.
DS Amaral	19–29 September	Melissa Batchelor	A detective sergeant under the employ of Norma Crow (Glynis Barber). When James Nightingale (Gregory Finnegan) gives them a lead on The Undertaker, DS Amaral informs Godfrey about his betrayal. On the day James is due to go the police, DS Amaral kidnaps him and takes him to Norma, who locks him in a coffin. When Warren Fox (Jamie Lomas) goes after Norma, he locks DS Amaral in a car, however, she later escapes and attempts to push him to his death, unintentionally pushing Norma down as well.
Dealer	22 September	Joe Parker	A drug dealer hired by Victor Brothers (Benjamin O'Mahoney) after escaping from prison. Victor enlists Sid Sumner (Billy Price) to sell drugs to him, but they are caught by Lizzie Chen-Williams (Lily Best) who threatens to call the police. The dealer runs, but Sid knocks his phone out of his hand so he cannot tell Victor about the failed deal.
Dr Slavin	30 September	Rebecca Bainbridge	A doctor who treats Warren Fox (Jamie Lomas) following his fall.
Dr Keller	13–17 October	Gemma Wardle	A doctor who treats Imran Maalik (Ijaz Rana) after he is admitted to hospital for an infection. When Imran's mother Misbah Maalik (Harvey Virdi) scares him by suggesting he has an eating disorder, Dr Keller has her leave Imran's room, before later indicating that she should leave the hospital.
Councillor Valmont	25 October–2 November	Tam Williams	The leader of Hollyoaks Council who meets with Tony Hutchinson (Nick Pickard) following the Hollyoaks Carnival. He preaches family values to Tony, so is less than impressed when Beau Ramsey (Jon-Paul Bell) is revealed as his son. Councillor Valmont later meets with someone who he believes is a Mrs Robinson, but is actually Sienna Blake (Anna Passey) and sleeps with her, before later flirting with Ste Hay (Kieron Richardson). Ste and Valmont go on a date, and are interrupted by Sienna, and although Ste is initially repulsed by the fact that Valmont had slept with Sienna, he is talked into taking him home. After having sex, Valmont collapses and Ste believes he has died, so he and Sienna move the body. They are both relived when it is revealed that Valmont had just accidentally taken sleeping pills.
Dr Davidson	29 October	Nadia Emam	A family psychiatrist for Felix Westwood (Richard Blackwood) and DeMarcus Westwood (Tomi Ade).
Valerie Valmont	1 November	Victoria Scowcroft	The wife of Councillor Valmont who confronts Ste Hay (Kieron Richardson) and Sienna Blake (Anna Passey) when she tracks her husband's phone to their van. Sienna manages to convince Valerie that Valmont's phone had just fallen under her van, and when she accuses Ste of sleeping with Valmont he pretends to be straight and flirts with her.
Teen 1	4 November	Brandon Phoenix-Davenport	A teenager who bullies a young Warren Fox (Thomas Ryan) in a flashback.
Bartender	7 November	Ben Mabberley	A bartender who flirts with Maxine Minniver (Nikki Sanderson) and on a night out. The bartender allows Maxine to charge her phone, and later kisses another patron. This is observed by Verity Hutchinson (Eva O'Hara) and Theresa McQueen (Jorgie Porter) who believe it is Maxine, unaware she was thrown out the nightclub.
Bouncer	7 November	Rebecca Clare-Evans	A bouncer who cautions Verity Hutchinson (Eva O'Hara) when she brings her own alcohol into a nightclub, confiscating it off of her. When she catches Maxine Minniver (Nikki Sanderson) drinking from a flask that had been brought in, she throws her out of the club.
Attacker	8–9 November	Benedict Shaw	A man who attacks Maxine Minniver (Nikki Sanderson) after she walks home alone from a nightclub. She is able to fight him off before he rapes her, and reports him to the police. Zoe Anderson (Garcia Brown) later tells Maxine that he was caught, and that he was an office worker with a wife and children.
Bride Lola	8 November	Jodie Hamblet	A bride, accompanied by her three hens, who meets Romeo Nightingale (Owen Warner) on a night back from a nightclub. When Lola suffers cold feet ahead of her wedding, Romeo encourages her to walk down the aisle.
Bus Driver	8 November	Jamie Cousins	A bus driver who allows Maxine Minniver (Nikki Sanderson) onto his bus despite her lack of money.
Hen Amber	8 November	Amy Dowser	Three women on a hen night who along with Lola (Jodie Hamblet) meet Romeo Nightingale (Owen Warner) on his way back from a nightclub. Romeo and the ladies all have an easy journey home, with Romeo even being showered in kisses by them.
Hen Daisy	8 November	Keicha Greenidge	Three women on a hen night who along with Lola (Jodie Hamblet) meet Romeo Nightingale (Owen Warner) on his way back from a nightclub. Romeo and the ladies all have an easy journey home, with Romeo even being showered in kisses by them.
Hen Kiki	8 November	Danielle Brown	Three women on a hen night who along with Lola (Jodie Hamblet) meet Romeo Nightingale (Owen Warner) on his way back from a nightclub. Romeo and the ladies all have an easy journey home, with Romeo even being showered in kisses by them.
Man 1	8 November	Connor J. Barrie	A man who catcalls Maxine Minniver (Nikki Sanderson) on her way home from a nightclub, when he is later passed by Romeo Nightingale (Owen Warner), he pays him no attention.
Woman 1 Lisa	8 November	Hayley Sheen	Two women who attempt to convince Maxine Minniver (Nikki Sanderson) to get into a taxi with them where they offer to drop her off at a bus stop. Maxine turns down their offer, but in an alternate version of events, accepts their offer to get to the bus stop.
Woman 2 Sarah	8 November	Alexandra Daszewski	Two women who attempt to convince Maxine Minniver (Nikki Sanderson) to get into a taxi with them where they offer to drop her off at a bus stop. Maxine turns down their offer, but in an alternate version of events, accepts their offer to get to the bus stop.
Dr Lewis	17 November 2022–5 January 2023	Stephen Hoo	A doctor who runs tests on Imran Maalik (Ijaz Rana) after he is encouraged to get tested for an eating disorder. Believing himself to be healthy, Imran attempts to convince Dr Lewis to finish the appointment, before storming out when asked to weigh himself. Imran returns the next day after coming to terms with his illness, but is told by Dr Lewis he cannot be admitted as his symptoms were not severe enough. When Imran is admitted to the hospital with hypothermia, Dr Lewis discovers that Imran's records were tampered with and implies to Misbah Maalik (Harvey Virdi) that for Imran to keep his place at the clinic, she would have to resign from the hospital.
Mei Lian Chen	12–15 December	Stacy Liu	The parents of Shing Lin Leong (Izzie Yip) who visit the Chen-Williams family with their daughter. Afraid of their judgement, Mei Lian's sister, Honour Chen-Williams (Vera Chok) pretends that Dave Chen-Williams (Dominic Power) is the CEO of a logistics company, although the lie is detected. When Honour and Dave run into marital problems, they are comforted by the pair with Mei Lian revealing her own financial woes to Honour. When she admits it to Meng Chye, the pair argue and decide to leave Shing Lin in Hollyoaks as they unable to afford her boarding school.
Meng Chye Leong	12–15 December	Nicholas Goh	
Avatar	13 December	Benedict Shaw	A virtual avatar that manifests in Mason Chen-Williams' (Frank Kauer) head encouraging him to take advantage of Leah Barnes (Ela-May Demircan).
Angus	15–16 December	Charlie de Bromhead	A gangster that Norma Crow (Glynis Barber) tasks Grace Black (Tamara Wall) with meeting in order to secure some counterfeit money. However, Warren Fox (Jamie Lomas) decides to do the deal instead, refusing to hand any payment over to Angus. Angus orders his thugs to attack Warren, but is apparently threatened off by him. Warren is later angered when he sees Norma gifting Angus a new car as payment for the money.
Dr Fenton	19–20 December	Andrew Bone	A doctor that Grace Black (Tamara Wall) pays off to fake tests saying that Norma Crow (Glynis Barber) is not a suitable liver donor for Warren Fox (Jamie Lomas). After the deal, Dr Fenton leaves a voicemail for Grace asking for more money, which is overheard by Sienna Blake (Anna Passey).
Choir	23 December	Sense of Sound Singers	A group of carol singers that Felix Westwood (Richard Blackwood) passes on his way to Price Slice.
Registrar	29 December	Joe Evans	A registrar who marries Prince McQueen (Malique Thompson-Dwyer) and Olivia Bradshaw (Emily Burnett).
