= Zoe Anderson =

Fictional character from Hollyoaks

- Hollyoaks character
- Portrayed by: Garcia Brown
- Duration: 2022–2026
- First appearance: 21 February 2022
- Last appearance: 21 January 2025
- Introduced by: Lucy Allan (2022); Si Wall (2026)
In-universe information
- Occupation: Detective
- Mother: Sharon Bailey
- Sons: Theo Anderson
- Grandmothers: Pearl Anderson

Zoe Anderson is a fictional character from the British soap opera Hollyoaks, played by Garcia Brown. She made her first appearance on the episode broadcast on 21 February 2022. Brown auditioned for the role after feeling very low about her career. Zoe was introduced as the granddaughter of Pearl Anderson (Dawn Hope) and the new detective of the Hollyoaks village. Zoe is described as being dedicated to her job and not putting anything above it whilst also loving to party and have fun when not working, with Brown praising the two sides of the character.

In addition to her work as a detective, Zoe's storylines have included developing a relationship with Sam Chen-Williams (Matthew McGivern), her fractured relationship with her mother Sharon Bailey (Jamelia), discovering she is pregnant, breaking up with Sam and dealing with Sam's obsessive behaviour following their breakup. Zoe was also involved in a knife crime storyline. Zoe later begins a relationship with Hunter McQueen (Theo Graham) and became a suspect in Rayne Royce's (Jemma Donovan) murder, a relationship with Prince McQueen (Malique Thompson-Dwyer). For her role as Zoe, Brown was longlisted for Best Newcomer at the 2022 Inside Soap Awards. However, Zoe's relationship with Sam has been criticised due to their lack of screentime.

== Casting and characterisation ==
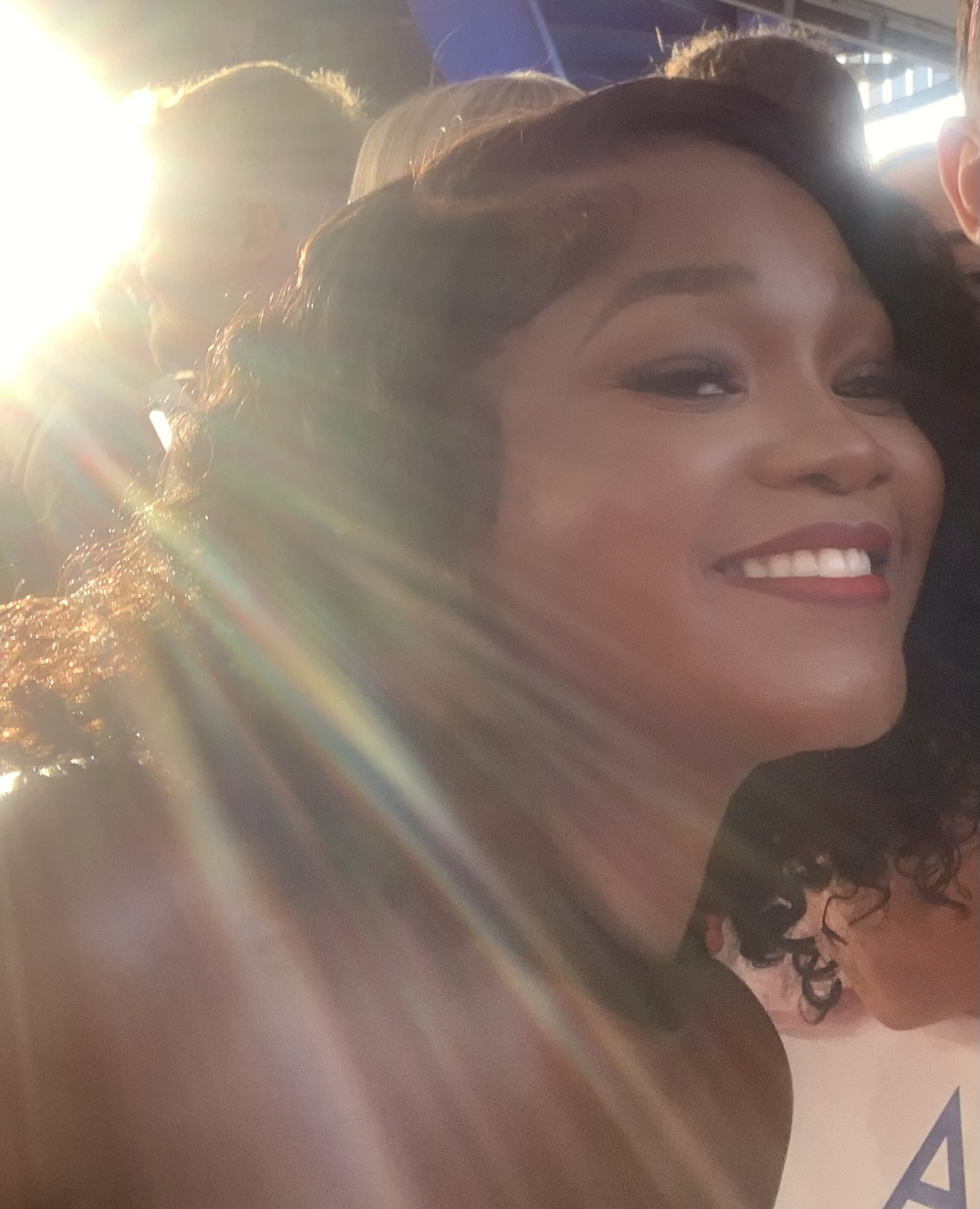
Garcia Brown was cast as Zoe.

It was announced on 14 February 2022 that Garcia Brown had joined the cast of Hollyoaks as Zoe Anderson, a new detective and the granddaughter of established character Pearl Anderson (Dawn Hope). Zoe's debut aired on 18 February on E4 and 21 February 2022 on Channel 4. Of the casting process, Brown revealed in a podcast that she heard about the role from her agent shortly after being rejected from a role in another production, which had made her feel the "lowest" she had felt in her career. Brown initially did not known that the role was for Hollyoaks, believing it was for a Netflix production instead. She analysed the script that she had been sent and "embodied the character" and recorded a tape the next day, which her agent sent off. The following week, her agent told her that Hollyoaks wanted her to do another audition process, where she learnt what show the role was for. She then went to do the final process in the studios before being offered the role. Brown started working on the soap in October 2021 but had to keep her casting a secret, having signed a Non-Disclosure Agreement, and she struggled with not being able to tell those close to her and had to give excuses when asked to make plans by her friends. Producers later gave Brown some time off due to the deaths of two people close to her. Brown also revealed that she drives to the set.

"Zoe is energetic, vivacious and headstrong. A wonderful detective by day, she's a wild child by night, one who loves to party."

— Stephen Patterson from Metro on Zoe's personality prior to her debut (2022).

Prior to her debut, Stephen Patterson from Metro noted that despite Zoe replacing a recently demoted Saul Reeves (Chris Charles), she "soon makes her presence felt and settles into the village nicely." Justin Harp from Digital Spy speculated that Zoe would have conflict with Saul due to Saul trying to bring down Felix Westwood (Richard Blackwood), the son-in-law of Walter Deveraux (Trevor A. Toussaint), who Pearl is living with. Harp also wrote that Zoe would "instantly put herself in the heart of the village" by making friends with Cleo McQueen (Nadine Mulkerrin), Verity Hutchinson (Eva O'Hara) and Theresa McQueen (Jorgie Porter). Brown said that Zoe's bond with the other girls is "friendship goals" and that the actress was close to Porter and Jorgie from the cast, in addition to Hope. Brown has noted that Zoe is serious about her job and would not put it "in jeopardy for anyone" but also wants to "go out and paint the town red". Brown called the cast and production team of the soap "a family", with everyone being very "warm" and "welcoming". She revealed that she used to watch the soap when she was in school and "that "Everytime someone asks me about Hollyoaks, I can't help but smile!" She said that joining the Hollyoaks "family" had been "super exhilarating", adding that:

"I didn't know what to expect coming into the show but I felt right at home the moment I got here, and I'm super excited for what's in store...There's more than meets the eye to my character Zoe – she has a lot of exciting moments on screen! I've had the pleasure of joining the Deveraux family and working with such warm and talented individuals like Kéllé Bryan, Richard Blackwood, Jorgie Porter, Jennifer Metcalfe, Eva O'Hara and more! I'm so eager for everyone to see what I've been up to."

Brown has said that she likes that there are two sides to the character, with one being a "workaholic" that "won't let anything come in the way of what she has built herself up to" and the other being a character who "loves to party", let loose and be "around her friends." Brown called her "headstrong" and commented that Zoe won't back down for anyone, and that Zoe has had "a lot to prove" due to becoming a DS at a young age. Brown also joked that Zoe has "a lot of crime-stopping to do" due to the number of crimes that occur in the soap. Brown said that she enjoys playing the character and relates to Zoe a lot, saying that she portrays elements of herself when playing the character, though joked that she "does like to party" but not as much as Zoe. She also called the character "all round fun", "loving" and "outgoing". Brown also revealed that she often adds elements that she experiences everyday herself to the character. In 2023, Brown told Inside Soap that "Zoe is big into visualisation and manifesting, and so am I. It definitely helped in my Hollyoaks audition, and I got the part!"

== Development ==
=== Introduction and early storylines ===
Shortly after the character's debut, Zoe was involved in a special episode focusing on International Women's Day. In July 2022, Zoe was involved in a knife crime storyline following the stabbing and death of Saul. Brown revealed that Zoe has a "rather frantic and emotional" reaction to Saul's stabbing and that due to "Saul being her friend and colleague", Zoe "jumps into action immediately when receiving the bad news." Brown said that she felt "grateful" to be involved in the storyline, adding that "To be able to shed light on conversations that happen behind closed doors and all the layers that go into these experiences for everyone involved is definitely something" and that she could not wait for viewers "to see the emotional roller coaster". Garcia also teased that viewers would be "holding on to their seats and shouting at the television when watching the knife crime story unravel." In the storyline, DeMarcus Westwood (Tomi Ade), who Zoe and Pearl live with, is wrongfully implicated of fatally stabbing Saul, which leaves Zoe "torn" between her job in the police and her loyalty to her family. Zoe attempts to arrest DeMarcus when his prints are found on the knife and the family break into an argument, with Zoe saying that DeMarcus should trust the legal process and give himself to the police; however, DeMarcus ends up running away as his father Felix Westwood (Richard Blackwood) restrains Zoe.

=== Relationship with Sam Chen-Williams ===
"[B]eing with Sam was meant to be a bit of harmless fun and she never saw them starting a family. He was in deeper than her from the get-go - it wasn't on her vision board![...] He has crazy abandonment issues because so many members of his family have left, and he pulls that out of the bag. Zoe does feel sorry for him, but that is the situation and he needs to heal. He can't put it onto her and the baby and the decision she's making - it's huge emotional blackmail."

— Brown on Sam and Zoe's relationship (2023)

Upon her debut, Brown teased a romance with Sam Chen-Williams (Matthew McGivern), saying that "Sam very much catches Zoe off-guard. She never thought it would come to anything, but the attraction keeps growing." Brown also commented that Zoe "likes" that Sam is a "mystery" and that the pair play "hard to get" with each other, noting that "it's a case of cat and mouse!" and that Zoe being Sam's boss is a problem.

The following year, Sam tries to repeatedly catch criminal Warren Fox (Jamie Lomas). Zoe warns Sam to stop but Sam plants drugs on him, leading to Zoe breaking up with Sam. Patterson from Metro wrote that Zoe is "somewhat unsettled" by Sam's change of behaviour, and that Sam was going "to the extreme" to "prove his devotion to Zoe" as he does not want the relationship to end. Zoe then finds out that she is pregnant after taking a test. When Sam finds out, he makes several attempts to win Zoe back, who tells him that she will not get back with even regardless of whether she is pregnant or not. Zoe plans to have an abortion due to not feeling ready to be a mother yet, and continues to deal with Sam's obsession over getting back together with her, who refuses to accept that the relationship is over. Sam pleads with Zoe to not go through with the termination but she tells him that work is her focus.

Speaking to Inside Soap, Brown ruled out the possibility of Sam and Zoe getting back together, saying that she did not think that there was "anything left." She added that "For Zoe, they are completely done. Let's leave this alone, it's gone far enough and they weren't even supposed to be together in the first place because they worked together." Brown also noted that Zoe is not ready to have children due to her "career", as she "has built herself up to be one of the youngest detective inspectors out there - if she pauses now she risks losing all of that." Brown also speculated that Zoe would have her eye on another guy in the village, and noted that she was getting closer to Sam's uncle, Ethan Williams (Matthew James-Bailey), having confided in him about the pregnancy, though noted that it would be weird due to Zoe investigating him for murder the previous year.

Sam's behaviour then gets worse when he sends Zoe a book on being a parent and managing a career. Zoe is then uncomfortable when she comes home to find Sam in her flat, who has broken in. She threatens to take legal action but agrees to give him five minutes to explain himself and tells him that she no longer loves him and is not keeping the baby. Sam's half-sister and Zoe's friend Maxine Minniver (Nikki Sanderson), who had assured Zoe that she would help with the situation after becoming concerned at Sam's obsessive behaviour, tells the police about Sam breaking in.

=== Relationship with mother ===
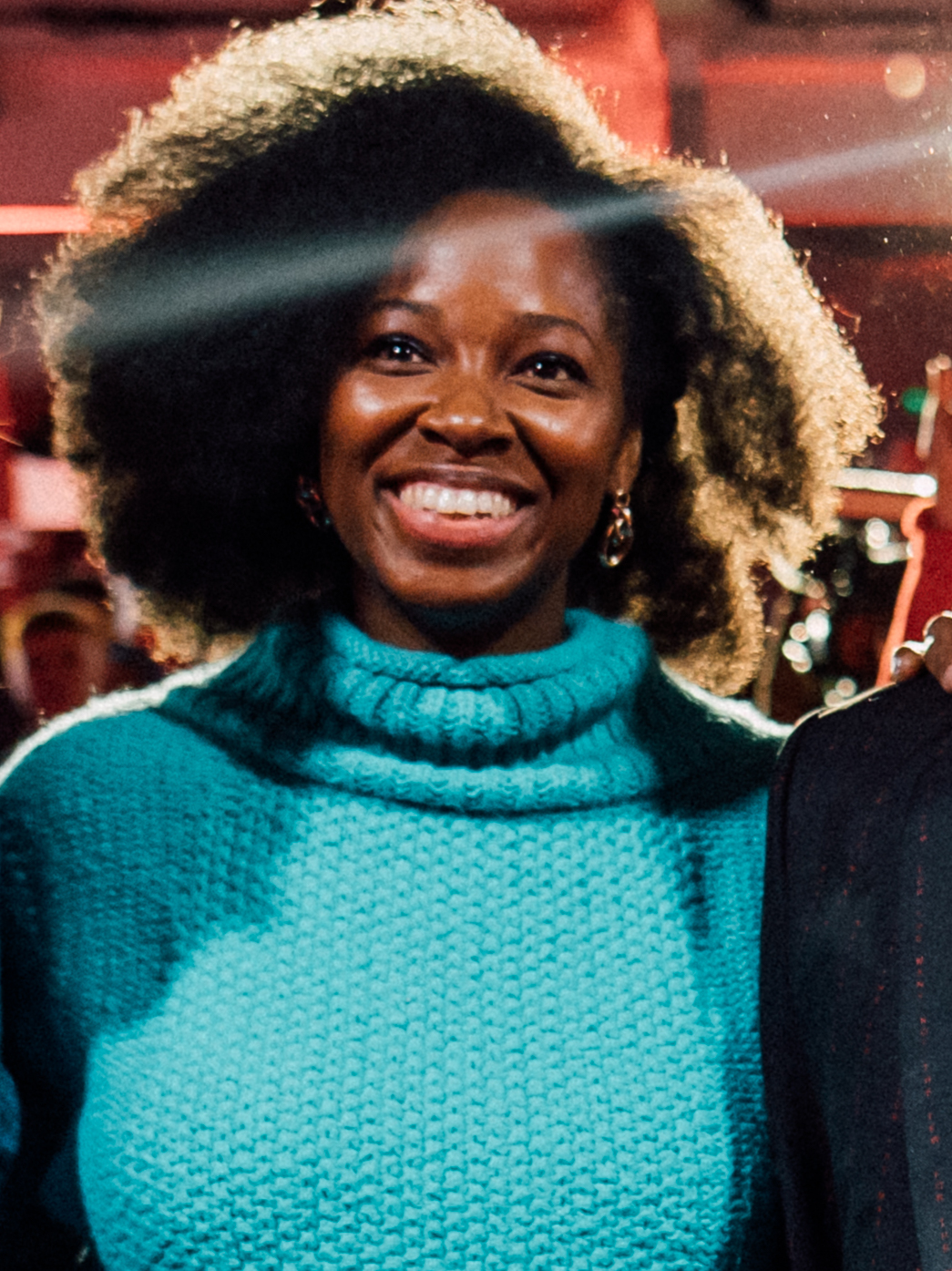
Jamelia portrays Zoe's mother, Sharon Bailey, who Zoe has a difficult relationship with.

Zoe's mother, Sharon Bailey, played by Jamelia, was reintroduced in 2023, following a brief appearance in October 2021. Brown has previously told Inside Soap that she hoped that Jamelia would return to Hollyoaks as she wanted to have the opportunity to work together. Brown watched Jamelia on television when she was younger and was excited to work with her, noting that she developed a bond with her offscreen and called Jamelia her "soul family". Jamelia revealed that Sharon's return would "unsettle the family dynamic", saying that "Sharon hasn't always prioritised her daughter and her mum [Pearl] is stuck in the middle. There’s a lot for them to work through and I can't wait for viewers to see how that plays out on screen." The relationship is tested when it is revealed that Sharon told Sam about Zoe's pregnancy and her decision to have an abortion, which makes Zoe furious. Referring to the situation, Brown told Inside Soap:

"Zoe feels betrayed by Sharon and can't believe she told her business to the person she had asked her to keep it from. They don't have the best mother-daughter relationship, Zoe was practically raised by her grandma Pearl as Sharon put her career before being a parent. I actually don't agree with Zoe hiding the pregnancy from Sam, they should've had a conversation. But Zoe thought it was easier not to tell him and get his hopes up, and she was making that decision for herself."

In 2024, Jamelia chose to leave Hollyoaks and Zoe was involved in Sharon's exit story, which aired in April 2024. In the storyline, Sharon decides to move to Dubai and tries to persuade Zoe to leave with her, but Zoe does not want to leave her friends and family in the village. Zoe then tells Sharon that she needs her to be proud of who she is now rather than taking her to Dubai to make up for being absent during her childhood. When Sharon leaves, Zoe tells "tearfully" tells Pearl that leaving is "just" what Sharon does.

=== Relationship with Hunter and Rayne's murder ===
Zoe later starts dating Hunter McQueen (Theo Graham), with Brown saying that the "relationship between Zoe and Hunter is easy going, a safe space and someone she can let her guard down around." The relationship is challenged when Rayne Royce (Jemma Donovan) edits a video to make it look like Hunter is having an illegal relationship with a student, which leads to a brief break up between Zoe and Hunter. Zoe later finds herself on "the wrong side of the law" when she is considered a suspect of Rayne's murder due to having been at the scene with other character when Rayne was murdered. Speaking to the Daily Mirror, Brown said that Zoe "won't be involved as much as she would like to be, with being in the manor at the time of Rayne’s death, she's now been forced on the other side of the law." Speaking about filming the scenes at the mansion, Brown said that it "was a beautiful location" and that she and the other cast members had "as much fun as [they] could", although noted that due to bad weather they spent many days inside when it was raining rather than by the pool. Brown also revealed that she hoped that Zoe would "just have happiness" and "to let love in all whilst balancing that with a kickass career". Zoe was considered a suspect, with Brown citing Zoe's devotion to Hunter as the potential motive, commenting that "Rayne has done some really bad things to Hunter, someone she really cares about and is practically in love with now. If she did have a motive to kill Rayne it was to protect the ones that she loves".

Zoe becomes frustrated that she is unable to work and breaks up with Hunter, blaming him for being part of the murder investigation. When Hunter's friends, such as Peri Lomax (Ruby O'Donnell), accuse Zoe of murdering Rayne, Hunter chooses Zoe over them and tells Zoe that she is his girlfriend; however, Zoe then makes an "incriminating discovery" when she finds the edited the video of Peri admitting to Rayne's murder on Hunter's brother, Prince McQueen's (Malique Thompson-Dwyer), laptop, though it is unclear whether he made it or if there is another explanation. Zoe becomes "implicated" when she overhears a conversation between Hunter and Prince revealing that Hunter believes he killed Rayne. Zoe later offers Hunter an "olive branch" and tells him that she wants to regain his trust following the tension between them, which leads him to admit to her that he stole Rayne's phone on the night of her murder. Zoe wants to give the phone to her police colleagues but Hunter asks her not, which "once again" leaves Zoe "torn" between her loyalty to her friends and her job.

== Storylines ==
Zoe arrives in Hollyoaks and accepts a job as a Detective Sergeant at Dee Valley University Hospital, replacing Saul Reeves (Chris Charles). She moves in with her grandmother, Pearl, who is living with Walter Deveraux (Trevor A. Toussaint) and his family. Zoe becomes friends with Cleo McQueen (Nadine Mulkerrin), Verity Hutchinson (Eva O'Hara) and Theresa McQueen (Jorgie Porter). Zoe begins falling for Sam Chen-Williams (Matthew McGivern) and is injured at his boot camp when Bobby Costello (Jayden Fox) tampers with the weights. Sam and Zoe initially have a fling and later begin getting serious but the relationship is complicated when Sam's uncle, Ethan Williams (Matthew James-Bailey), is accused of killing Maya Harkwell (Ky Discala). Zoe is removed from the case but continues seeing Sam. Zoe reveals to Sam that she was a victim of revenge porn. When Saul is killed in a knife crime attack, Zoe is determined to find the killer but is put in the middle of her job and family when DeMarcus Westwood (Tomi Ade), who is living with Zoe, is accused of killing him. However, it is revealed that Joseph Holmes (Olly Rhodes) is the culprit and he confesses after Zoe interrogates him. Zoe's friendship with Sam's half-sister Maxine Minniver (Nikki Sanderson) is tested when Maxine accuses Verity's brother Eric Foster (Angus Castle-Doughty) of being the culprit who is spiking people in the village, and Zoe does not believe her, though Maxine is later proven right. Zoe is devastated when Verity is killed by Bobby and Zoe is involved in the case against him. Zoe is unhappy when her mother Sharon Bailey (Jamelia) moves to the village, though they begin to reconnect when Sharon tells her that her fiancé has left her.

Zoe and Sam try to prove that criminal Warren Fox (Jamie Lomas) is running an illegal business but they fail to do so, with Warren threatening Zoe and warning her to leave him alone. Sam, who wants to impress Zoe and help her get a promotion, continues to try to catch Warren, with Zoe repeatedly telling him to stop. Sam goes as far as planting drugs on him which leads to Zoe, who is unsettled by his behaviour, breaking up with Sam. Sam refuses to accept the end of the relationship. Zoe finds out that she is pregnant and plans to have an abortion, not wanting to jeopardise her career. Sam pleads with her to not go through with the termination but Zoe refuses, telling him that it is her choice and that she does not want her child growing up like Zoe, who did receive enough attention from Sharon due to her dedication to her job. Zoe is angry at her mother for having told Sam about the pregnancy and threatens to report her for breaking patient confidentiality. Zoe is accidentally hit when she tries to break up a fight between Sam and Ethan due to Ethan having known that Zoe was pregnant and planning to have an abortion. Sam's obsessive behaviour grows worse, even going as far as sending Zoe a book on how to handle parenting whilst having a career. Sam then breaks into Zoe's flat to talk to her and she threatens legal action but agrees to hear him out. Zoe tells Sam that she no longer loves him and will not keep the baby. Zoe is accused of calling the police on a remorseful Sam but it is revealed that it was Maxine who actually did so.

Zoe goes on a date with Hunter McQueen (Theo Graham) and the pair begin dating.

== Reception ==
Garcia Brown was longlisted for Best Newcomer at the 2022 Inside Soap Awards for her role as Zoe, although she did not make the shortlist. At the 2022 Digital Spy Reader Awards, she came third for the Best Soap Newcomer accolade. The scene where "Zoe Tells Abused Maxine "It's not your fault"" was nominated for "Scene of the Year" at the 2023 British Soap Awards.

A month after Zoe's debut, Joe Anderton from Digital Spy wrote that the character had "already made quite the impression as someone who is dedicated to her job". The following year, Anderton's colleague, Daniel Kilkelly, wrote that Zoe's relationship with Sam was "oddly portrayed" due to the characters "hardly ever sharing romantic scenes (or any screen time at all, for that matter) when they're supposed to be a couple." Alice Penwill from Inside Soap agreed, commenting that their romance "does seem to have taken a back seat". Penwill also wrote that she wanted to see more of the "Anderson ladies" as she believed that Pearl, Zoe and Sharon were all "brilliant". Johnathon Hughes from Inside Soap called Zoe a "glamorous cop desperate to prove herself" and added that she had made a "big" impact on Hollyoaks, and believed that Brown was one of the soap's "Rising stars". Following the end of Zoe and Sam's relationship, Hughes' colleague Sarah Ellis questioned whether Zoe would end up with Ethan and joked that Zoe should "Cop a load of anyone else" that is not Sam.

In 2023, Charlotte Tutton from the Daily Mirror called Zoe a "surprising suspect" in Rayne's murder and that "viewers will no doubt be hoping Zoe isn't the killer", as well as adding that Zoe being the killer would "certainly be quite the twist". Sophie Dainty from Digital Spy placed Zoe fifth on her list of the biggest suspects of Rayne's murder and noted that she could not see Zoe killing Rayne, but added that "stranger things have certainly happened in Hollyoaks". Dainty also called Zoe "level-headed". Chris Newbould from Prolific North believed that Zoe had played a "prominent role" in the 2022–23 "Long Walk Home" storyline.
