= Dawn Hope =

British actress

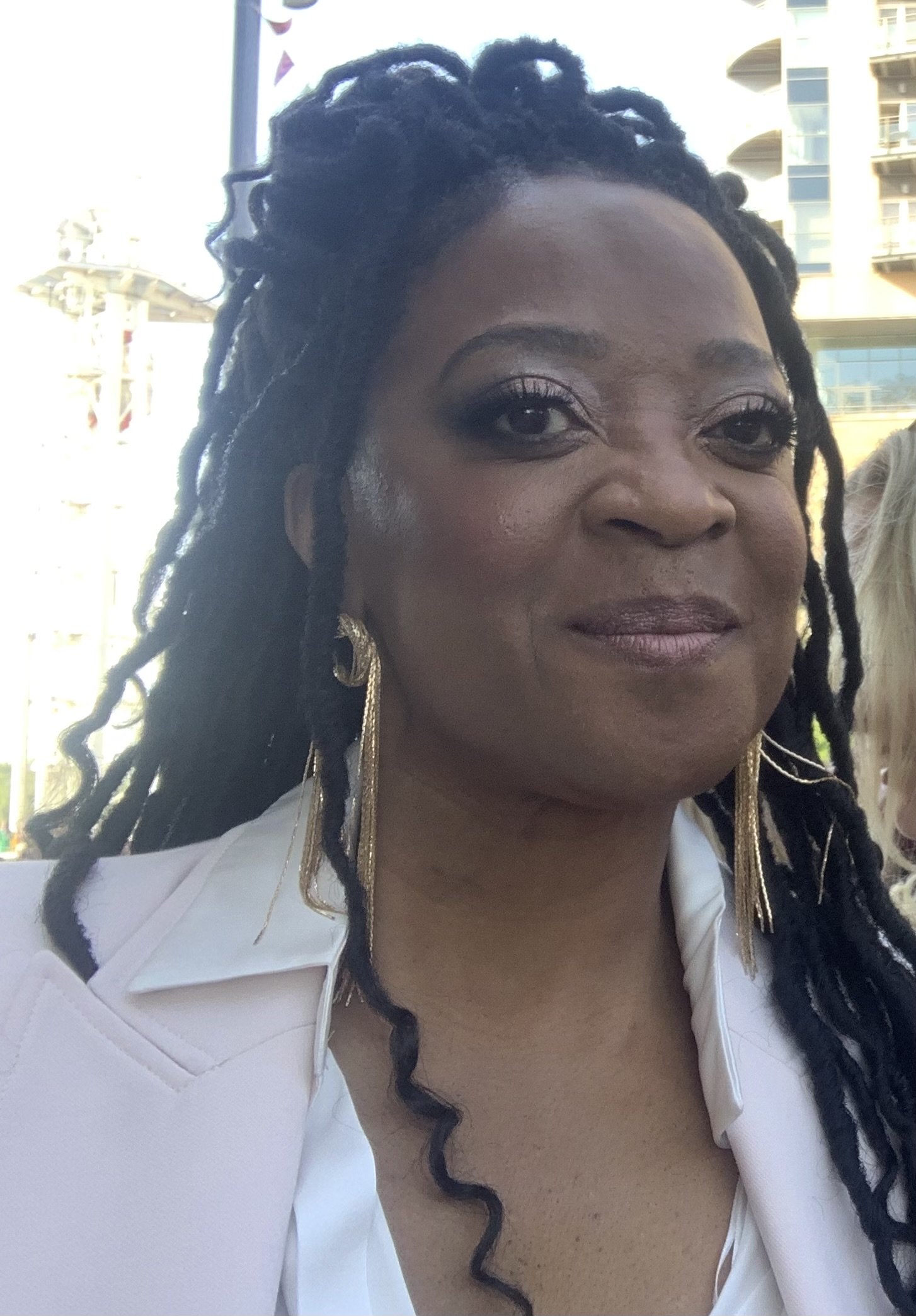
- Hope at the 2023 British Soap Awards
- Occupation: Actress
- Years active: 1971–present
- Television: Waiting for God; Hollyoaks

Dawn Hope is a British actress. She began her career with roles in movies such as Melody (1971) and Black Joy (1977). From 1983 to 1985, she played Ronnette in the UK stage production of Little Shop of Horrors. She played the role of Jenny in all five series of the British sitcom Waiting for God, which aired from 1990 to 1994. She received praise for her performance in the 2006 production of Porgy and Bess and for her singing voice in the 2007 theatre production of Rough Crossings. From 2012 to 2013, Hope played the recurring role of Alison Soames in the soap opera Coronation Street. From 2017 to 2018, she played Stella Deems in the Royal National Theatre's production of Follies and she later played Betty Currie in Devil with the Blue Dress at the Bunker in 2018 and General Cartwright in Guys and Dolls at the Crucible Theatre from 2019 to 2020. Since 2021, she has portrayed Pearl Anderson in the Channel 4 soap opera Hollyoaks. She has also appeared in various other movies and television series, including The Fosters, Play for Today, Midnight Breaks, Hale and Pace, I Live with Models, Casualty, Pointless Celebrities and The Sorcerer's Apprentice.

== Life and career ==
Dawn Hope portrayed Maureen in the 1971 children's romantic comedy-drama film Melody. She later played Saffra in the 1977 film Black Joy. She appeared in a 1977 episode of the second series of the British television series The Fosters. She also played Yvonne in the Play for Today episode "Not for the Likes of Us", which was broadcast on 10 April 1980. Hope then played Ronnette in the UK stage production of the musical Little Shop of Horrors, which ran from 1 January 1983 to 5 October 1985 at the Harold Pinter Theatre (then known as "the Comedy Theatre"). Hope played a leading role in the 1990 movie Midnight Breaks. Between 1990 and 1994, Hope portrayed Jenny in all five series of the British sitcom Waiting for God. In 1995, she guest-starred in episode of the eighth series of Hale and Pace. Hope has also appeared in a few episodes of medical drama Casualty.

In 2006, Hope performed in the opera Porgy and Bess at the Savoy Theatre, playing the widow Serena. She received praise for the role; Philip Fisher from British Theatre Guide opined that Hope and Lorraine Velez were the best singers in the production, adding that Hope had a "soulful force", whereas Michael Billington from The Guardian praised Hope as part of the supporting cast of the production. Michael Coveney from WhatsOnStage.com also listed Hope as one of the performers in the play to "stand out". The following year, Hope performed in the theatre production of Rough Crossings, playing Phyllis George. Cecily Boys from British Theatre Guide praised Hope's "stunning gospel voice" in the production, writing that it could "inspire anyone to fight for freedom from the depths of despair".

In 2012, it was reported that Hope would debut on the British soap opera Coronation Street as Alison Soames. Alison and her husband Edwin Soames (David Lonsdale) were introduced as the parents of established character Kirsty Soames (Natalie Gumede). Hope and Lonsdale made their debut in the episode originally airing on 24 May 2012. They reprised their roles for another stint later in 2012, and Hope also played Alison again in 2013. In 2017, Hope guest-starred in the first episode of the second series of the sitcom I Live with Models, which was originally broadcast on 6 February of that year. Hope played the role of Stella Deems in Follies, which ran at the Royal National Theatre from 22 August 2017 to 3 January 2018. The production won several awards. Hope also played the role in its filmed production National Theatre Live: Follies (2017). In 2018, Hope played Betty Currie in Devil with the Blue Dress, a play about the Clinton–Lewinsky scandal, at the Bunker.

Dawn later played General Cartwright in an adaptation of Guys and Dolls, which ran from 7 December 2019 to 18 January 2020 at the Crucible Theatre. Speaking of what attracted her to join this production, Hope explained, "I grew up watching Guys and Dolls. So when I got an invitation to be in this 'Iconic Show', I knew it had to be now or never. Also to come back home to Sheffield, after a twenty four year absence is very special me...and over Christmas". Ron Simpson from WhatsOnStage.com opined that Hope's character radiated "good will" in the production. Hope has also appeared in various other movies, including Richard's Things (1980), and other television series such as Pickersgill People, Out, Dempsey and Makepeace and Endeavour. Hope has also appeared as herself in the 1988 concert Hey, Mr. Producer! and an episode of the quiz show Pointless Celebrities which was originally broadcast on 6 January 2024.

In 2021, Hope had a role in the online streamed musical The Sorcerer's Apprentice. In August of that year, it was announced that Hope had been cast as regular character Pearl Anderson on the British soap opera Hollyoaks. Pearl was introduced as the family friend of established character Walter Deveraux (Trevor A. Toussaint). Speaking about joining the soap opera, Hope said she was "absolutely thrilled to be introducing the fun-loving Pearl, with her vibrant and stylish energy, as I join the warm and welcoming Hollyoaks team". Hope made her first appearance as Pearl in Episode 5675, which was originally broadcast on 10 September 2021. The special episode featured an entirely Black cast as part of Channel 4's "Black to Front" project to highlight Black talent behind and in front of camera. Since Hope joined the soap, Pearl's storylines have included her attempts to integrate herself into the Deveraux family, the introduction of her daughter Sharon Bailey (Jamelia) and granddaughter Zoe Anderson (Garcia Brown), being arrested for hiding DeMarcus Westwood (Tomi Ade) from the police, developing a romance with Jack Osborne (Jimmy McKenna), and confiding about the abuse that her sister faced by their brother. Hope enjoyed working with McKenna and revealed that the pair had mutual friends going back 40 years, and she believed that her scenes with McKenna were similar to improv.

== Personal life ==
Hope has a brother and a sister in law. Hope considers herself to be a "bit of a romantic".

== Selected credits ==
=== Filmography ===
Year	Title	Role	Notes	Ref(s).
—N/a	Casualty	—N/a	Guest role(s)	
1971	Melody	Maureen	Children's film	
1977	Black Joy	Saffra	Film	
1977	The Fosters	Celia	1 episode ("That's My Boy" – Season 2, Episode 11)	
1980	Play for Today	Yvonne	1 episode ("Not for the Likes of Us")	
1980	Richard's Things	Movie	—N/a	
1990	Midnight Breaks	Cassie/Sarah	Movie	
1990–94	Waiting for God	Jenny	All 5 series	
1995	Hale and Pace	Ensemble Actor	1 episode (Series 8, Episode 5)	
2012–13	Coronation Street	Alison Soames	Recurring role	
2017	I Live with Models	Carrie	1 episode ("New York" – Series 2, Episode 1)	
2017	National Theatre Live: Follies	Stella Deems	Musical filmed live on stage	
2021	The Sorcerer's Apprentice	—N/a	Online streamed musical	
2021–present	Hollyoaks	Pearl Anderson	Regular role	
2024	Pointless Celebrities	Herself	1 episode (Series 16, Episode 9)	

=== Theatre ===
Year	Production	Theatre	Role	Ref.
1983–85	Little Shop of Horrors	Harold Pinter Theatre (then known as "The Comedy Theatre")	Ronmette	
2006	Porgy and Bess	Savoy Theatre	Serena	
2007	Rough Crossings	Various	Phyllis George	
2017–18	Follies	Royal National Theatre	Stella Deems	
2018	Devil with the Blue Dress	The Bunker	Betty Currie	
2019–20	Guys and Dolls	Crucible Theatre	General Cartwright	
