= Sharon Bailey =

Fictional character from Hollyoaks

- Hollyoaks character
- Portrayed by: Jamelia
- Duration: 2021, 2023–24
- First appearance: 10 September 2021
- Last appearance: 24 April 2024
- Introduced by: Lucy Allan (2021, 2023)
In-universe information
- Occupation: Doctor; Nurse; Paedatrician
- Mother: Pearl Anderson
- Daughters: Zoe Anderson
- Grandsons: Theo Anderson

Sharon Bailey is a fictional character from the British Channel 4 soap opera Hollyoaks, played by Jamelia. Jamelia had previously appeared as herself in a 2003 episode of the soap. Sharon's character and casting was announced in August 2021 and she made her initial guest appearance on 10 September 2021 in an hour-long episode special episode featuring an entirely Black cast. Sharon was introduced as a family friend of the established Deveraux family and the daughter of new character Pearl Anderson (Dawn Hope). Following her initial guest appearance, Jamelia was invited to join the regular cast in 2022 and Sharon made her return in the episode airing on 21 March 2023. Jamelia was very happy to return as she enjoyed working on the soap and she credited her colleagues for being so welcoming. Jamelia characterised Sharon as being strong, confident and a bit of a loose cannon in her private life. Sharon's storylines focused on her work as a paediatrician, her fractured relationship with her daughter Zoe Anderson (Garcia Brown), a romance with Warren Fox (Jamie Lomas) and being blackmailed by Felix Westwood (Richard Blackwood). Despite being offered another year-long contract, Jamelia rejected it and the character departed on 24 April 2024. Jamelia revealed that she had really enjoyed her time on the soap but left it in order to focus on her mental health. Sharon was well-received by critics.

== Casting and development ==
=== Introduction ===
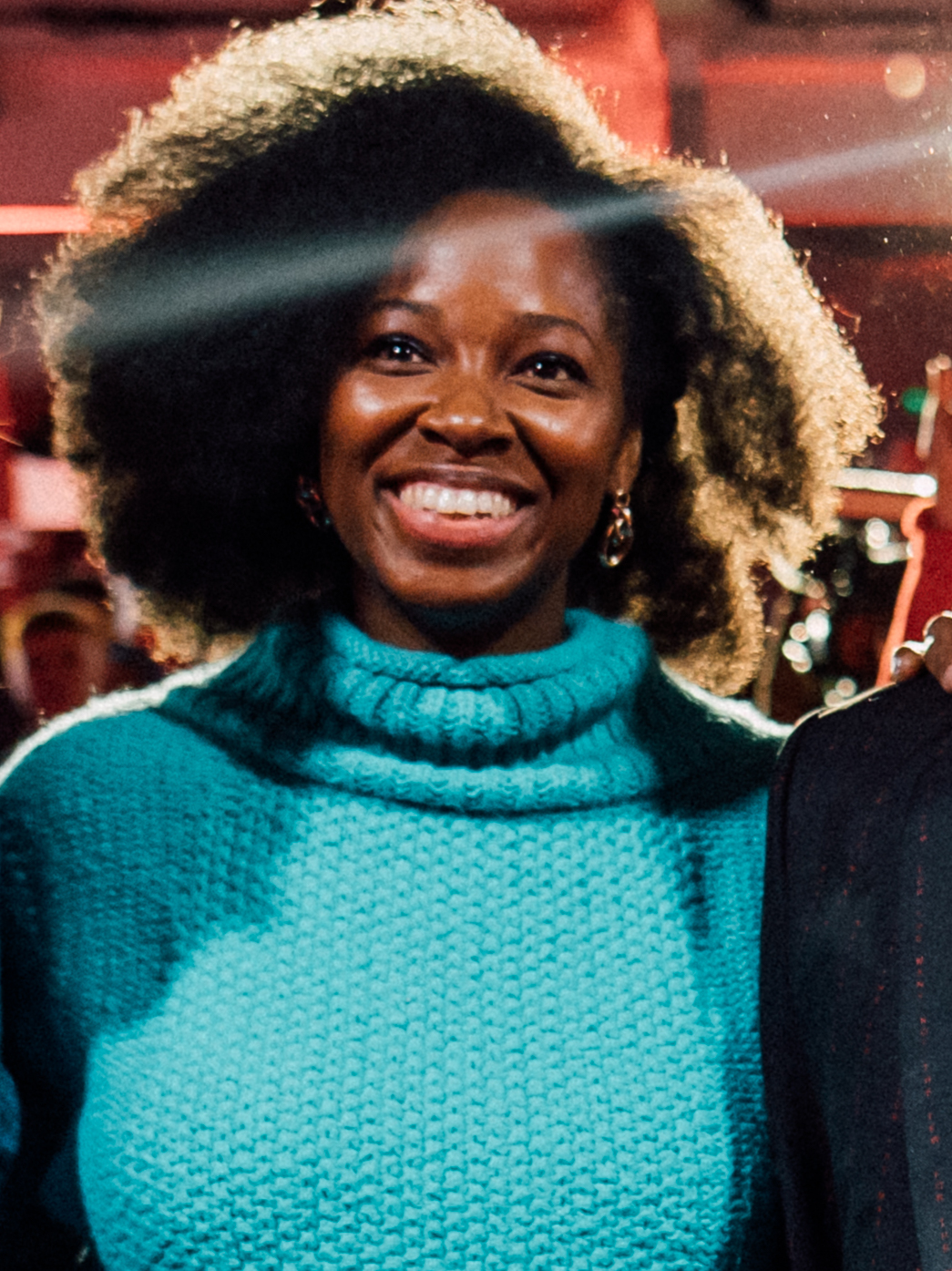
Jamelia had previously appeared on the soap in 2003.

In August 2021, it was announced that Jamelia had been cast on Hollyoaks for a guest appearance in its upcoming hour-long "Black to Front" episode, which featured an entirely Black cast as part of Channel 4's "Black to Front Project", which aimed to highlight Black talent in the television industry. Sharon was introduced as the daughter of Pearl Anderson (Dawn Hope), who also debuted in the episode, and a family friend of the established Deveraux family. Jamelia called filming on the soap the "most fantastic experience", commenting, "I've felt like I've been around family, I've felt so comfortable and so joyous. It's just been amazing. I can't believe this is supposed to be work". Jamelia believed that it was important that the soap was showing "diversity within Black existence" in the episode, adding, "So often Black people are portrayed in a monolithic kind of way, and I feel that an episode like this is really important to show the diversity within Black personhood. I'm really honoured to be included in this episode". Jamelia had previously appeared on the soap back in 2003, where she performed in the Hollyoaks Student Union bar as herself. Jamelia used to watch the soap when she was younger. Sharon's guest appearance and the Black to Front episode aired on 10 September 2021 on Channel 4, having aired the previous day on E4. The episode featured Sharon attend Walter Deveraux's (Trevor A. Toussaint) birthday party picnic, with Sharon "mischievously" planning with Walter's daughter and her good friend Martine Deveraux (Kéllé Bryan) to get Walter and Pearl together. Martine also confides in Sharon about her cancer ordeal and Sharon in return offers her advice, and she later joins the Deveraux family for a family group dance for Walter's birthday. Jamelia already knew Bryan before she worked on the soap.

=== Return ===
On 7 March 2023, it was announced that Jamelia would be returning to Hollyoaks as Sharon as a regular cast member. Pictures released showed Jamelia filming for the Hollyoaks opening titles sequence and took her promo shots in front of the Hollyoaks sign on her first day of filming. Hollyoaks executive producer Lucy Allan had previously teased earlier in 2023 that there would be the return of a character that had been seen briefly before and added that she was excited to have them in the cast. Jamelia said that she could not explain how happy she was to return to the soap, adding, "We've been having the best time on set and I already have lovely friends here, some old, some new". Jamelia revealed that she had suggested her return as she loved her 2021 guest appearance so much, explaining, "I got a bit brave and said, 'Listen, if you want Dr Sharon to come back, I would love to,' and I let them know and made it very, very clear that I just had the most amazing time". She then "jumped at the chance" when she was offered a contract in April 2022. Jamelia felt like a "competition winner" due to being such a fan of the soap and she could not believe that she was there. She explained that the "seed was planted" from her 2021 guest appearance, as she had told the crew that she would be happy to return as she enjoyed her time there and was told by other cast members that it was like this everyday; the actress also felt that it had all "come full circle" from her 2003 appearance on the soap. The actress added that her family was "ecstatic" that she had joined the soap and had already planned and screening and added that she was excited to see the episodes. The actress was also grateful to have the support of her family as her baby was only nine weeks old when she began working on set. Jamelia was given a year-long contract. The actress said that she was having the time of her life on the soap and credited her colleagues for being very friendly and welcoming, adding, "I just feel like I've always been there. It's a true testament to them as people, and the cast and crew, the fact that they treat people like that just makes it an amazing environment to work in so I have no complaints and if you know me, you know I love a complaint!" Jamelia found her first scenes with the established cast of the soap to be slightly "surreal" but she tried to "own it". Jamelia also called her return "everything I expected it to be". She called the soap a "real family environment".

"My character, she's a bit feisty. I describe her as a bit of a firecracker, she doesn't suffer fools, she's very brave and she's the type of person that would inspire me in real life."

— Jamelia on Sharon (2023)

Jamelia made her return during the Channel 4 episode that aired on 21 March 2023. Sharon's return aired during a special Mother's Day episode which saw Sharon visit Pearl and her daughter Zoe Anderson (Garcia Brown). Jamelia explained that whilst Pearl is happy to see her daughter, Zoe is not as close to Sharon as she chose to "heavily pursue her career", and so Sharon works on trying to mend their relationship. Pearl, who "couldn't be happier" by Sharon's return, tries to reunite Zoe and Sharon, but Zoe is reluctant to as she believes that her mother will leave again, though she agrees to have lunch with her. Jamelia explained that Sharon's return "unsettles the family dynamic", adding, "It's complicated within the three generations of women but hopefully that is relatable. Sharon hasn't always prioritised her daughter and her mum is stuck in the middle. There's a lot for them to work through and I can't wait for viewers to see how that plays out on screen". Jamelia said that her return felt like a "family reunion" and commented that Hope gives "the best hugs" and that her four daughter considered the "lovely" Brown to be their sister. She added that she, Hope and Brown kept saying how happy they are to be there. Brown watched Jamelia on television when she was younger and was excited to work with her; Brown revealed that the two actresses developed a bond offscreen and called Jamelia her "soul family". Jamelia said that she and Brown became very close.

Sharon also becomes friends with Mercedes McQueen (Jennifer Metcalfe) and Mercedes throws Sharon a party to welcome her to the village. Jamelia was excited to meet Metcalfe. Sharon also starts working at Dee Valley University Hospital as a paediatrician. Jamelia explained that Sharon is brilliant at her job and that she arrived in the village because of the new job at Dee Valley Hospital. The actress was excited to portray a doctor, joking that she was able to live out her "doctor dream" without the degree, and called Sharon a "boss" who is "strong and confident", who Jamelia loved to embody. The actress added that Jamelia goes "against the grain" and is not necessarily conventional. The actress also believed that Sharon was a bit of a "loose cannon" in her private life. Jamelia joked that it would be funny if Sharon was "tone deaf" due to the actress being a singer. Jamelia explained that she wanted to keep her singing separate from the character and believed it would be weird if Sharon started singing, but there was a few jokes added in the script hinting at the actress' singing career, such as when Sharon tells Zoe that she can "see it in a boy's eyes", which is one of her song titles. Sharon later finds out that Zoe is pregnant with her ex-boyfriend Sam Chen-Williams's (Matthew McGivern) baby and that she wants to have an abortion. Zoe asks her mother to support her, but Sharon tells Sam about the pregnancy instead. Zoe is horrified and furious that Sharon has told Sam. Zoe's portrayer Garcia Brown told Inside Soap, "Zoe feels betrayed by Sharon and can't believe she told her business to the person she had asked her to keep it from. They don't have the best mother-daughter relationship, Zoe was practically raised by her grandma Pearl as Sharon put her career before being a parent". When Sharon pleads with Zoe to hear Sam out, Zoe gets more angry and threatens to report her to the hospital for a breach of ethics. Sharon later apologises to Zoe for telling Sam about the pregnancy.

=== Warren and Felix ===
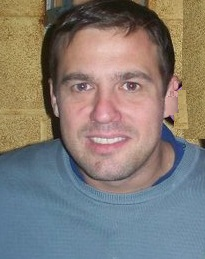
Jamie Lomas portrayed Warren Fox, Sharon's love interest.

Jamelia teased that there might be a romance "bubbling" with established character Warren Fox (Jamie Lomas) and suggested that there may be a love triangle or a "love square". In the storyline, Warren takes an interest in Sharon when she takes her car to be checked at his body shop, but his flirting is not reciprocated as she is not interested. However, Warren tries to show his nicer side by leaving a picture that his daughter drew in Sharon's car, which appears to work as Sharon writes her number on the back of it. Sharon later agrees to go on a date with Warren after she is impressed by his cheesy pickup lines. It had previously been teased by Allan that Warren's mother Norma Crow (Glynis Barber) would struggle with her jealousy due Sharon "vying for Warren's love and affection". Norma disapproves of Sharon and believes that Warren deserves better.

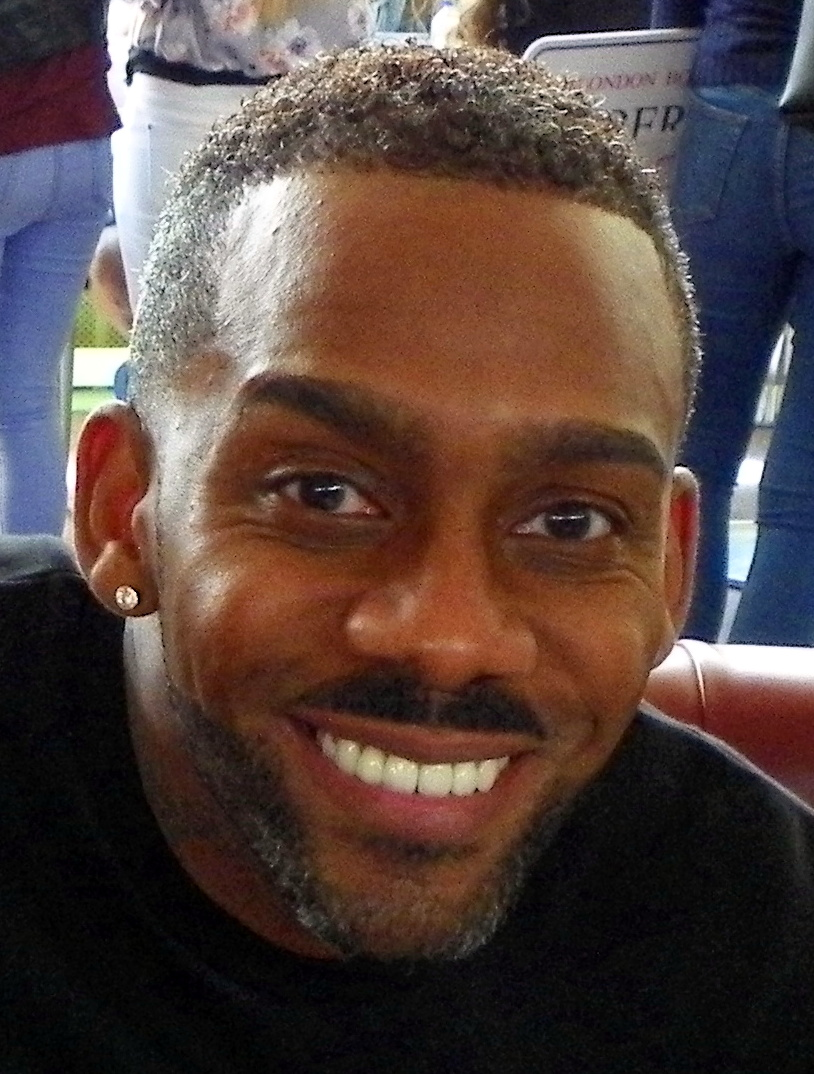
Richard Blackwood portrays the role of Felix.

Sharon then finds out that Felix Westwood (Richard Blackwood) has been involved in illegal boxing in an attempt to channel his frustrations over the departure of his son, DeMarcus Westwood (Tomi Ade). The storyline was intended to highlight Felix' mental health challenges. It had previously been reported that Sharon would have storylines with Felix, who Pearl had become a mother-figure to, and his girlfriend Mercedes. Jamelia already knew Blackwood as she had appeared on his show The Richard Blackwood Show when she was 17, which she said was her "claim to fame". Jamelia was glad to work with Blackwood again and said that he would make her laugh on set a lot. In the storyline, Sharon is on a date with Warren, where he is flirting in a French accent, when she gets a text message from Felix asking for her help with his injuries; she makes an excuse to leave and goes to see Felix. Felix initially refuses to tell Sharon how he got his injuries but is forced to when she threatens to not help him. Felix' fighting had previously caused Sharon to break up with Warren when he took the blame for Felix' injuries. Sharon is shocked and tells Felix how dangerous illegal fighting is and he asks her to keep it a secret. Sharon encourages Felix to open up to Mercedes, his girlfriend, but he refuses and lies that he has stopped. Sharon becomes "determined" to help Felix and make him stop fighting. She discovers that Felix has been lying to her about stopping and she threatens to tell Mercedes, but he blackmails her with a 20-year-old secret to keep quiet. A "distraught and conflicted" Sharon turns to her family for guidance, and she decides to walk away from the situation despite "her instinct" to help Felix.

=== Departure ===
On 27 March 2024, it was reported that Jamelia would be departing Hollyoaks as Sharon. The news came after Jamelia joined the cast of new reality TV show Drama Queens, which followed the lives of actresses who appeared on soap operas; a press release for the reality show "accidentally" revealed the exit when it said, "Jamelia embarks on a transformative journey, prioritising her own well-being and family over the glitz of Hollyoaks. As she prepares to bid farewell to the show, we witness her emotional transition". Jamelia and Hollyoaks had not confirmed the exit yet. The news came after it was announced that about 20 Hollyoaks cast members would be written out due to the soap opera cutting down from 5 to 3 episodes a week. It was then confirmed that Jamelia had made the decision to leave the soap before the cast cuts were announced.

"I'm so glad that I took the plunge and said yes to Hollyoaks. Even though it was during the most difficult time of my life, I feel that it was perfect. I had such an amazing time doing the work, but also bonding with the cast. I really felt like I was part of a family. I would tell everyone my business and it was just really nice to have different perspectives. People say that a lot – 'Oh, it's like a family!' – but it genuinely is. Everyone's got different personalities, you get to know people and you find out their little quirks. I feel really fortunate to have had this experience."

— Jamelia on her Hollyoaks experience (2024)

Jamelia explained that she turned down another year of appearing on the soap as she wanted to focus on improving her mental health and heal after the sudden breakup of her relationship with her partner when she was pregnant; Jamelia explained, "Hollyoaks was like putting a plaster on a very deep wound. But I know I haven't done the healing work that needs to be done and I can't do it while focusing on such a demanding job". The actress added that she had never focused on her mental health when she was working in the entertainment industry for the past 25 years. Jamelia had previously explained on Drama Queens that her breakup in 2022 had "propelled" her to take up working in Hollyoaks in order to take care of her family. Hollyoaks had offered Jamelia another year-long contract in early 2024 but she declined it as she believed it was not the "right thing" for her to do, though she admitted that it was a difficult decision as she had really enjoyed her time on the soap. She added, "I need to take some time for myself. I need to stop. I need to think. I need to process and I need to deal with all the things I haven't dealt with". The actress was unsure if she would regret leaving the role and was "truly grateful" that the door had been left open for Sharon to return in the future; she had begged the producers to not kill off Sharon so she could return in the future. She added that she had loved "Every single second" of being on Hollyoaks and called it "amazing". Since Jamelia had enjoyed her time on Hollyoaks, she believed that she would like to act again after taking some time to "recharge".

Jamelia's last episode as Sharon aired on 24 April 2024. In the character's exit storyline, Sharon decides to move to Dubai after being headhunted for a job there and she believes that she has convinced Zoe to come with her, evening finding a job application for her. Whilst Pearl is unhappy with the short notice and says she will miss Zoe and Sharon, she says that she could not be more proud of them; however, Zoe does not want to leave the village behind. Zoe then admits that she does not want to leave her friends behind and tells Sharon that she needs her to be proud of who she is now rather than taking her to Dubai to make up for not being there for her as a child. Sharon then leaves the village and Pearl comforts Zoe while she cries, with Zoe saying that Sharon leaving is "just what she does". Jamelia revealed on Drama Queens that when filming her exit scene, the car that Sharon leaves initially would not start, which made Jamelia and the other cast members laugh. Jamelia called this "Typical Hollyoaks style, or typical Jamelia chaos style" and believed that it "injected" some fun into her "grand exit". Jamelia was very happy with her exit and believed that her final scene went well, saying, "I was really proud of it because I remember my first scene, and I was racked with nerves… My last scene, I was just like, 'I've got this' and I felt so confident, and I felt like an actual actress". Jamelia also said that she would miss working with Hope and Brown, calling them "phenomenal women" that she had learned so much from, and hinted that the three of them may reunite on the soap one day. The three of them cried real tears during her exit scene.

Jamelia believed that more could have been explored with Sharon but acknowledged that a lot was going on behind the scenes during her stint. She explained, "I definitely think that there's more that we could have done with Sharon – and there's still more that we can do with her. That's fantastic because we still have the opportunity, should we choose to take it, to explore 'Sharon Land' and I think that'd be brilliant". The actress enjoyed Sharon going to work in the hospital and felt like she was on medical show Grey's Anatomy, which she was a huge fan of. Jamelia felt worried for her colleagues when she found about the cast cull, explaining that she had gotten very close to her fellow cast members, saying, "When you're working on Hollyoaks, you form a bond with the cast and crew. You just become so close with them – you know their kids' names and everything like that". However, Jamelia also believed that her colleagues would have successful careers beyond Hollyoaks due to their talents and believed that they should stay positive. Jamelia had watched many soap operas and felt that they made her feel not alone, explaining, "I know sometimes the stories are far-fetched, but sometimes they raise conversations and awareness. They allow you to think differently about your community and the people around you. So I think soap is extremely important. It would be devastating to see people decide to throw it all away". She believed that soap operas needed to adapt to fit the modern climate and praised Hollyoaks for moving to streaming and changing to suit the audience. Jamelia later said after departing the soap that she was not sad to no longer being working in Hollyoaks as it meant that she had more free time and was able to spend more time with her children, with the soap schedule having made her realise how "valuable" her time is. Just like Sharon's character, Jamelia later moved to Dubai herself.

== Storylines ==
Sharon, a doctor, arrives for Walter Deveraux's (Trevor A. Toussaint) birthday party picnic and catches up with his daughter and her good friend Martine Deveraux (Kéllé Bryan). Martine confides in Sharon about her cancer and the struggle she is going through. At the party, Sharon tries to matchmake her mother Pearl Anderson (Dawn Hope) together with Walter. After Martine's partner Felix Westwood (Richard Blackwood) almost drowns, Sharon checks him over and advises Martine to be honest with Felix about her cancer diagnosis. A year and a half later, Sharon returns to the village and tells her daughter Zoe Anderson (Garcia Brown) and Pearl that she has accepted a job at Dee Valley University Hospital and moves into the village. Zoe is initially unhappy to see Sharon as she prioritised her career over being a mother but she softens when she finds out that Sharon's fiancé, Dean, left her. Sharon angers Zoe when she tells Sam Chen-Williams (Matthew McGivern) about Zoe's plan to abort his baby and after apologising, Sharon promises to always support her daughter. Gangster Warren Fox (Jamie Lomas) flirts with Sharon and although she initially rejects his flirting, she eventually accepts his offer of a date, but calls it off when she sees him angrily confronting Terry Smart (Ryan Pope). Sharon comforts Yasmine Maalik (Haiesha Mistry) when she has a miscarriage and discovers she cannot have more children.

Sharon later agrees to go on a date with Warren after seeing his fatherly side but the pair agree to keep it a secret from Felix. Sharon is impressed with how supportive Warren is with Felix' son DeMarcus Westwood (Tomi Ade) and she goes to dinner with Warren and they have sex. Felix is unhappy when he discovers this and Sharon teams up with Felix' new girlfriend Mercedes McQueen (Jennifer Metcalfe) to stop their partners from clashing. Sharon breaks up with Warren after she finds out that he beat Felix but she later forgives him after talking to Felix. Sharon then finds out that Felix is doing illegal fighting and that Felix never beat him up. Sharon helps with Felix' wounds and encourages him to stop fighting and tell Mercedes. When he does not stop, she threatens to tell Mercedes, but Felix stops her by blackmailing her, as he took the blame for her 20 years prior when Sharon's boyfriend got her involved in a credit card scam. Sharon later clashes with Misbah Maalik (Harvey Virdi) over the running of the hospital but the two make up when Misbah saves Zoe's life after she has an allergic reaction to a prawn sandwich and the pair have a heart-to-heart. Sharon decides to look past Misbah's mistake of tampering with her son Imran Maalik's (Ijaz Rana) file to get him into a clinic. Sharon later gets a job offer in Dubai and encourages Zoe to move with her, but Zoe does not want to leave the village, so Sharon departs on her own. Zoe and her baby Theo Anderson later join Sharon when they depart the village.

== Reception ==
Discussing Sharon's debut, Tilly Pearce from the Daily Mirror opined that Sharon was "just the person Martine needs in her life right now" as she was able to confide in her about her cancer. Stephen Patterson from Metro praised Jamelia's 2021 debut in the soap, writing that her guest appearance "did not disappoint" and asked if she could be a "series regular please". He also placed Jamelia's appearance as one of the key moments of the episode, writing, "Jamelia was just brilliant as Sharon, and here's hoping she makes another appearance again in the future!" Patterson also called the dance routine that Sharon was part of in the episode as being "truly iconic". Patterson later opined that it was a surprise that Sharon was Warren's new love interest and questioned whether their flirting was the "beginning of something special". Patterson also called Sharon a "much-loved star" and a "much-loved doctor" and believed that her goodbye with Zoe was emotional, writing, "Not crying, I swear!" Patterson also believed that Sharon had had a "passionate" romance with Warren and called her exit "major". Patterson wrote that "Our hearts aren't ready" for Sharon's exit. Patterson also believed that it was "safe to say" that Sharon had "made quite an impact on fans, proving a force to be reckoned with at Dee Valley hospital, where she's always on hand to offer advice to those in need".

Alice Penwill from Inside Soap wrote that she wanted to see more of the "Anderson ladies" as she believed that Pearl, Zoe and Sharon were all "brilliant". Stefania Sarrubba from Radio Times believed that Sharon found "more than she bargained for" when Warren took an interest in her when she went to get her car looked at. Justin Harp from Digital Spy believed that Sharon's decision to tell Sam about Zoe's pregnancy was "potentially dangerous" and questioned whether Zoe would be able to forgive her. Daniel Kilkelly from the same website believed that Hollyoaks "had only just started scratching the surface with Sharon" ahead of her departure. Stefania Sarrubba from Digital Spy called Sharon's exit "tearful".
