= Pearl Anderson =

Fictional character from Hollyoaks

- Hollyoaks character
- Portrayed by: Dawn Hope
- Duration: 2021–present
- First appearance: 10 September 2021
- Introduced by: Lucy Allan
In-universe information
- Occupation: Shopkeeper
- Brothers: Carl
- Sisters: Ruby
- Daughters: Sharon Bailey
- Granddaughters: Zoe Anderson
- Other relatives: Theo Anderson

Pearl Anderson is a fictional character from the British soap opera Hollyoaks, played by Dawn Hope. The character and casting was announced in August 2021 and Hope made her first appearance as Pearl in Episode 5675, which was broadcast on 10 September of that year. Pearl was introduced as a family friend and potential love interest for Walter Deveraux (Trevor A. Toussaint). Pearl's initial storylines saw her reminiscing with Walter and clashing with his daughter, Martine Deveraux (Kéllé Bryan), when she attempts to mother her. Hope characterised Pearl as being lonely and wanting to feel needed, though she also called her fun-loving with a stylish and vibrant energy.

Pearl's family was later expanded with the introduction of her granddaughter, Zoe Anderson (Garcia Brown) and the reintroduction of Sharon. Pearl was featured in a storyline where she supports DeMarcus Westwood (Tomi Ade) when he is accused of murder and she is briefly arrested. Pearl was later given a new love interest when she was paired with long-running character Jack Osborne (Jimmy McKenna). Hope enjoyed working with McKenna and believed that the pairings of their characters had been very special. Pearl was also made the new owner of the soap's local convenience shop, Price Slice. Pearl later supports Frankie Osborne (Isabelle Smith) when she reveals that she has been sexually abused by her brother and Pearl takes her under her wing. The plot was used to explore Pearl's backstory as she reveals that her sister was abused by their brother. Pearl and Jack's relationship was well-received by critics, with Inside Soap calling it the hottest new romance in the soap.

== Casting and characterisation ==
In August 2021, it was announced that Dawn Hope had been cast as Pearl Anderson on Hollyoaks. It was reported that Pearl has a connection to established character Walter Deveraux (Trevor A. Toussaint), having been close friends with his deceased wife and having been friends with the Deveraux family for years. It was also reported that Pearl would come to the village to catch up with the Deveraux family and reminisce about "all the wonderful times" she spent with Walter's wife. Speaking about joining the soap opera, Hope said in a statement, "I'm absolutely thrilled to be introducing the fun-loving Pearl, with her vibrant and stylish energy, as I join the warm and welcoming Hollyoaks team". Hope had previously appeared in another British soap opera, Coronation Street. Hope made her first appearance as Pearl in Episode 5675, which was originally broadcast on 10 September of that year. The episode was a one-hour special produced, written and directed by Black creatives and featured an all-Black cast and was part of broadcaster Channel 4's Black to Front movement, a day where solely Black-fronted programming was shown. Pearl was one of five new regular characters who made their first appearance in the episode, alongside Nate Denby (Chris Charles), Olivia Bradshaw (Emily Burnett), DeMarcus Westwood (Tomi Ade) and returning character Prince McQueen (Malique Thompson-Dwyer). Jamelia also guest-starred in the episode as Pearl's daughter, Sharon Bailey.

== Development ==
=== Introduction ===
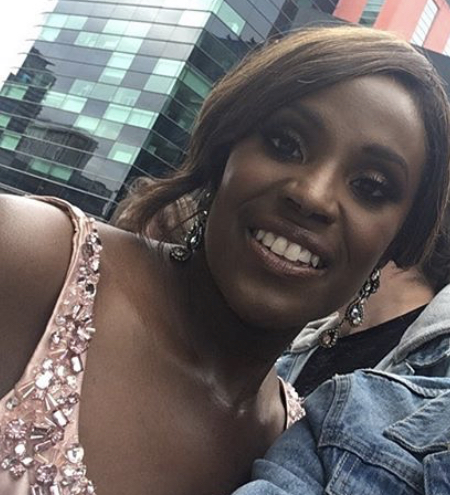
Kéllé Bryan portrays Martine, whom Pearl clashes with.

Pearl's debut episode featured her attend Walter's birthday party picnic, with Sharon "mischievously" planning with Walter's daughter Martine Deveraux (Kéllé Bryan) to get the pair together. Walter is delighted to see Pearl, but weeks later Martine becomes "increasingly fed up" with Pearl's presence. When Walter later goes away for a bit, Pearl promises him that she will take care of his family in his absence, but her attempts to help them causes tension and Martine does not appreciate Pearl's interference. Inside Soap teased that Pearl would drive Martine "mad" with her attempts to "mother her". Pearl also tells Martine's soon-to-be stepson DeMarcus Westwood (Tomi Ade) that she is homeless, and she tells him that she put Sharon through school and university and offers him revision plans, which leads to him offering her a place to stay. Hope explained that Pearl was "plotting" something when she told DeMarcus about being homeless, but the actress also believed that a "lovely bond" had begun to form between the two. When "poor" Pearl overhears Martine complaining about her, she confides in Scott Drinkwell (Ross Adams) that she is only trying to keep her promise to Walter by looking after things. Hope explained that Pearl hearing Martine complain about her is "shocking" to Pearl and she finds it "quite hurtful" as Walter asked her to look after Martine. Hope added that Pearl gets into a "bit of a huff" about it and that Pearl believes that Martine should be grateful for doing the cooking and cleaning for her.

Scott feels sorry for Pearl and attempts to "fight her corner" with the Deveraux family and offers her a place to stay if she wants space from the family. Martine feels guilty and apologises for being unwelcoming when Pearl declares that she feels unwanted. Explaining why Pearl wants to integrate herself into the Deveraux family, Hope explained to Inside Soap that Pearl wants some company and wants to feel needed. She added, "Pearl just wants to be helpful, but sometimes she doesn't realise that she's stepping on people's toes! I don't think a woman should be going into another woman's kitchen, because that's going to get the hackles up. Pearl thinks she's doing it from the goodness of her heart, but she's being a bit insensitive". Hope believed that Walter and Pearl could begin a romance, explaining, "It's when you rekindle a friendship that you start to see the similarities. Then you start looking at people in a certain way...". The actress clarified that Pearl and Walter would not "rush in" due to being mindful of Gloria's memory, but believed that Pearl is "a lady with a plan", adding, "When opportunity knocks, she takes it and runs with it!" Pearl and Martine put their differences aside and Pearl walks her down the aisle at her wedding to Felix Westwood (Richard Blackwood). Months later, Pearl supports pays her respects at the funeral of Martine and Felix's daughter, Celeste Faroe (Andrea Ali), in an "emotional" day for the Deveraux family.

=== Family issues and arrest ===
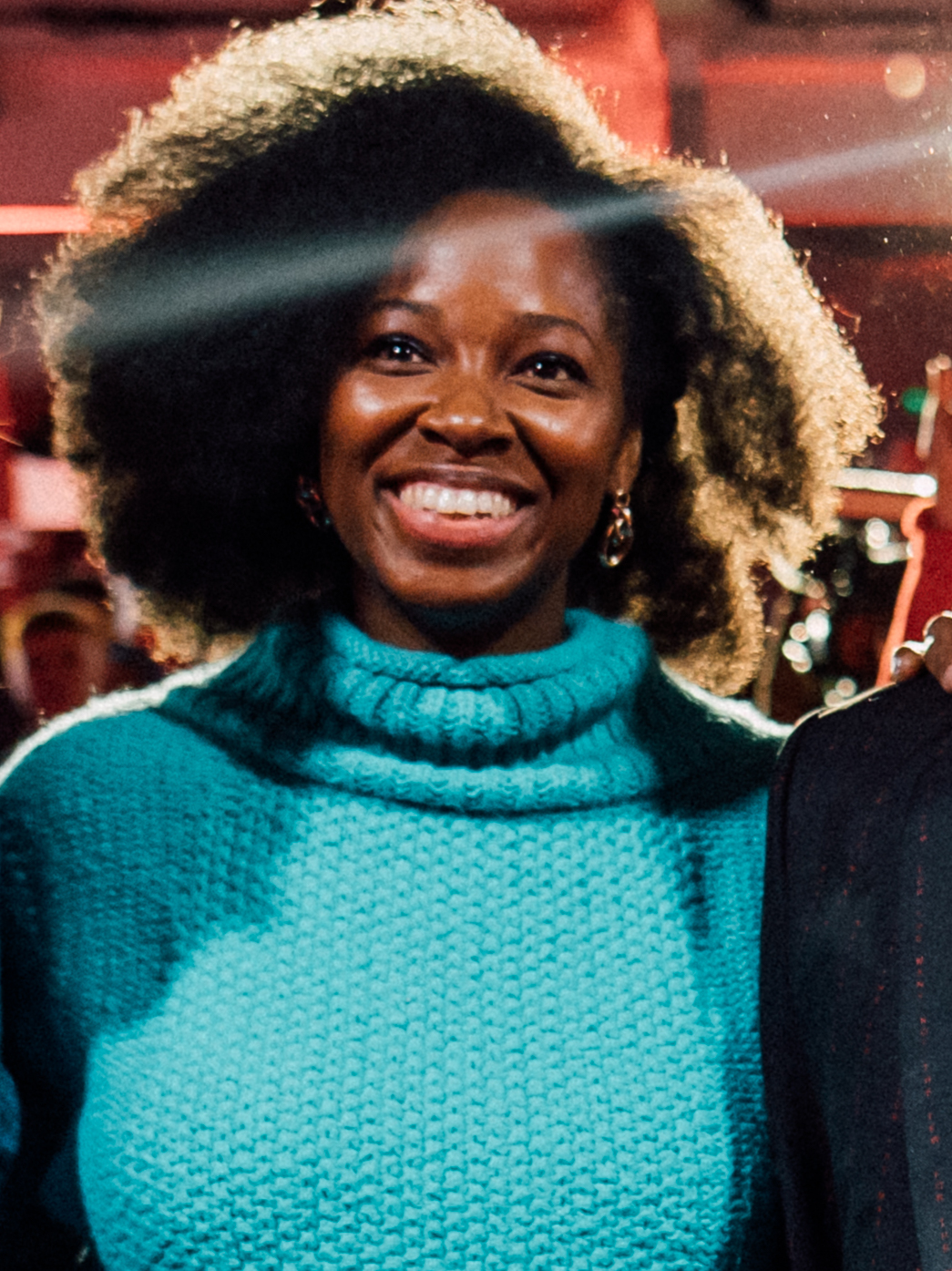
Jamelia portrays Pearl's daughter, Sharon Bailey.

Producers later introduced Pearl's granddaughter Zoe Anderson (Garcia Brown), who debuted in February 2022. Brown enjoyed working with Hope, calling her "amazing" and "caring" and revealing that Hope reminded her of her own grandmother and often gave her advice. DeMarcus is later wrongfully accused of fatally stabbing Zoe's colleague Saul Reeves (Chris Charles), which leaves Zoe "torn" between her job in the police and her loyalty to her family. Facing murder charges, DeMarcus decides to run away, but Pearl catches him before he does and he opens up to her about his worries of going to prison, so Pearl prevents DeMarcus from running away by telling him that they will think of a plan and that running will make him look guilty. Pearl then hides DeMarcus in Price Slice, but she sends him away when she realises that it is not safe. Pearl later reveals to Zoe, who had suspected that DeMarcus was being assisted by someone, that she helped DeMarcus secretly leave the village, and Pearl is unsure what to do, as Zoe thinks that the safest thing to do is to bring him back home, but Felix believes otherwise. Pearl then decides to give the address to Felix, but this backfires when Grace Black (Tamara Wall), wanting revenge for Saul's murder, finds DeMarcus using the location and tries to kill him. DeMarcus survives but Pearl is later arrested for "assisting an offender", leaving her in "complete and utter shock". Pearl is then "stunned" when she finds out that Zoe was the one who reported her. Pearl is also unhappy that DeMarcus has been arrested as it was her worst fear that has come true.

Toussaint departed as Walter later in 2022; in the storyline, Walter accepts Pearl's offer to fly him to Jamaica and Pearl promises to look after his family. Walter also gives to Pearl the keys to Price Slice, the local convenience shop, for her to take over. The following year, Jamelia was reintroduced as Pearl's daughter Sharon on a permanent basis. Sharon had initially appeared in the Black to Front episode with Pearl, but she returns to the village to surprise Pearl and Zoe years later. Jamelia revealed that Pearl is "over the moon" to be reunited with her daughter, although she confessed that Zoe may not feel the same way. Jamelia compared working with Brown and Hope to a "family reunion" and added that Hope gives the "best hugs". Jamelia later left the role in 2024; in the storyline, Sharon decided to move to Dubai and tries to get Zoe to move with her. Pearl supports the decision, saying that she will miss the pair but could not be "more proud", but Zoe ends up staying in the village whilst Sharon leaves, and Pearl comforts Zoe over her mother leaving once again.

=== Relationship with Jack ===
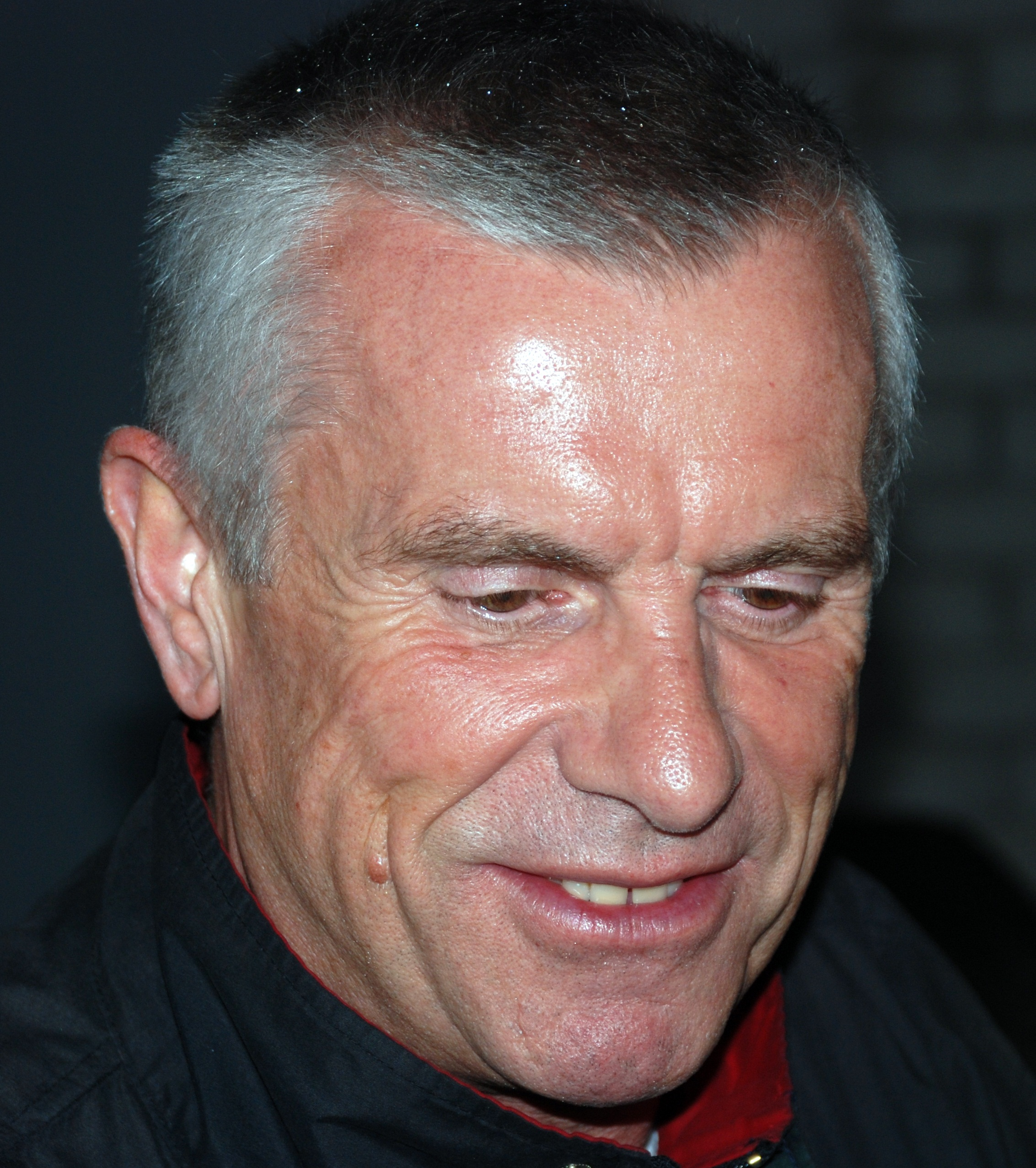
Jimmy Mckenna portrays Jack Osborne, who Pearl begins a relationship with.

In 2023, Pearl was romantically paired with long-running character Jack Osborne (Jimmy McKenna). In the storyline, Pearl helps Jack host the Earl Of Dee survival workshop. Hope revealed that the romance begins from a dare, as teenagers Lucas Hay (Oscar Curtis) and Dillon Ray (Nathaniel Dass), who want to win prizes from the workshop, then play cupid and tell Pearl that Jack has been speaking so highly of her, suggesting that she ask him out. Pearl appears to fall for their trick and asks Jack out, although the pair have already realised that they have been played. Hope believed that this was the "beauty" in the beginning of the friendship. She also adds that Pearl was previously not aware and missed all of the hints when Jack "kept coming" into her shop to buy milk. Hope enjoyed working with McKenna, calling him "awesome" and a "brilliant actor". The actors have mutual friends going back 40 years, and Hope believed that her scenes with McKenna were similar to improv. She added, "It's been so special to put these two characters together!"

Jack and Pearl spend more time together overseeing the Earl of Dee Awards and they then attend the opening of Tony Hutchinson's (Nick Pickard) new restaurant. Jack is surprised but happy to see that Pearl has arrived and whilst there, they grow close and Pearl sees another side of him when they dance together, and they ultimately kiss. Hope explained that Jack – in his "beautiful chivalry" – almost accidentally halts the romance when he tells someone that he and Pearl are just friends, which Hope revealed creates a bit of awkwardness and "wrong-foots" Pearl as she is expecting him to call her his new "lady love". Hope revealed that this makes Pearl realise that she needs to make a declaration, so she "has to lead him into it a bit with the kiss – although Jack goes with it, and is very happy!" Hope called the scene where Jack and Pearl kiss in the middle of the pub, with the crowd around them cheering at this, a "beautiful moment". Discussing the romance, Hope told Inside Soap, "Being mature, you go through processes in life of how you date. How you want to be treated grows more prevalent – and chivalry goes a long way when you're over a certain age as a woman. So when chivalry turns up in the shape of Jack, it kind of wrong foots Pearl and she goes, oh, that's nice!" Hope explained that now that Jack and Pearl are together, they need to figure out what that looks like. She added that Pearl is "very forward" and wants the "whole package", adding, "She wants to be wined and dined, she loves to get dressed up for fancy dinners. So as much as Pearl loves chivalry, she also wants to hurry things along a bit". Months later, Pearl organises a surprise birthday party for Jack with his son, Darren Osborne (Ashley Taylor Dawson), which he appreciates. Pearl and Tony also cover for Darren when a debt collector comes looking for him, but Darren pushes them away as he does not want to open up about the extent of his problems and debt. In July 2025, Pearl briefly breaks up with Jack following various family troubles, which really upsets him.

=== Abuse ===
In 2024, Pearl's backstory was explored when Hollyoaks aired a storyline to raise awareness around sibling sexual abuse, which revolved around JJ Osborne (Ryan Mulvey) abusing his sister, Frankie Osborne (Isabelle Smith). When the abuse is exposed in the pub, Pearls immediately steps in to support Frankie and shares a "trauma from her own childhood", revealing how her sister Ruby was abused by their brother when they were younger, which she blames herself for. Pearl explains that whilst they had lost touch because of what happened, she "warmly" praises her sister's bravery for speaking up.

Discussing Pearl's backstory, Hope explained that Dawn grew up with a brother and a sister that she was very close to and that they told each other everything. She explained, "Pearl knew her sister that well that when she pulls away, somethings wrong. Back then, Pearl wasn't in a good place yet to deal with what this could unpack. She didn't force the issue. She's had to live with the fact that she didn't have the life skills to know how to take it forward back then. A woman in a different demographic. She ingested it and put it away because there wasn't what there is now of schools recognising something's wrong, social workers and so on. It hurts Pearl all the time because the love of that relationship with your sister and support and the closeness, she didn't know how to fix it." Hope added that Pearl realises how brave Frankie is to speak out about her abuse as "who knows what decades of trauma unleashes. You're going to still have to say the hard thing. Whether you've ripped the plaster off at the beginning, or later in life. She's brave enough and strong enough to rip off the plaster".

Pearl confides her story to Frankie, who is "fully supportive", which Hope called a "beautiful gift". Hope revealed that there would then be a "healing point" that starts for Frankie. Hope also revealed that Pearl would then begin to release her "hidden truth", explaining that Pearl wants her sister back that she loves very deeply. Hope believed that Pearl cannot deal with the fact that she believes that she was not strong enough to stop the abuse as she did not know how to, but added that "somehow Frankie's bravery to say enough is enough is the most empowering, healing things you could do for yourself and it's right". Pearl then calls her sister, which "from the passage of time it instantly heals, that instant love and truth", and the sisters agree that life is too short. Feeling for Frankie, Pearl also tells JJ and Frankie's mother, Suzanne Ashworth (Suzanne Hall), that they are no longer welcome to stay at her house, which leads to a "fiery" row. Pearl then takes Frankie under her wing and the pair later begin working together.

== Storylines ==
Pearl and her daughter Sharon Bailey (Jamelia) arrive in Hollyoaks for Walter Deveraux's (Trevor A. Toussaint) birthday party, although Pearl is unaware that Sharon is trying to set Pearl and Walter up romantically. Walter is very happy to see Peal and they reminiscence about their childhood. Pearl accidentally upsets Walter when she brings up his deceased twin brother and she advises him to not live in the past, as he is regretting that he did not reconcile with his brother before his death. When Walter goes away to Jamaica, Pearl steps in to help Walter's daughter Martine Deveraux (Kéllé Bryan), who is undergoing chemotherapy. Pearl decides to move into their home after her house floods and being lonely due to Sharon moving away. Martine gets frustrated at Pearl's attempts to help the family and Pearl considers leaving, but they make up and Pearl attends Martine's wedding to Felix Westwood (Richard Blackwood). Pearl is very happy when her granddaughter Zoe Anderson (Garcia Brown) moves to the village as their new Detective Sergeant. Pearl feels lonely due to the Deverauxes' various family dramas, so Felix' son DeMarcus Westwood (Tomi Ade) convinces Martine to give Pearl a job at Price Slice, the local convenience shop. Martine and Walter later leave Hollyoaks and Pearl becomes the manager of Price Slice.

When DeMarcus is falsely accused of killing Saul Reeves (Chris Charles), Pearl supports him and encourages him to not run away. She later hides him at Price Slice and tells him to leave the village when she realises it is not safe, but he is later arrested and Pearl is arrested for assisting an offender. Pearl is furious when she finds out that Zoe was the one who reported her, but she forgives her when Zoe finds a technicality to get the charges dropped. Pearl is delighted when Sharon moves to Hollyoaks and she supports Zoe with her abortion despite it going against her religious beliefs. Pearl begins dating Jack Osborne (Jimmy McKenna) but their relationship suffers when Jack is falsely accused of being inappropriate with his granddaughter Frankie Osborne (Isabelle Smith). When it is revealed that Frankie is actually being sexually abused by her brother JJ Osborne (Ryan Mulvey), Pearl supports Frankie and kicks JJ and his mother Suzanne Ashworth (Suzanne Hall) out of her house. Pearl reveals to Frankie that her estranged sister was sexually abused by their brother, and that she blames herself for not being able to help, though she also says that her sister was the bravest person she knew for speaking out about it. Pearl then takes Frankie under her wing and becomes her boss when she begins working at Price Slice. Pearl becomes a great-grandmother when Zoe gives birth to Theo Anderson. Pearl ends up breaking up with Jack as she feels that she is still a guest in his house, but they quickly get back together after Jack shows his commitment towards her and promises to change.

== Reception ==
Following the announcement of Hope's casting, Justin Harp from Digital Spy believed that Pearl could be "the pick-me-up" that Walter needs following his recent struggles, and he questioned whether there could be "more than friendship blooming" between the two characters. His colleague, Susannah Alexander, also questioned whether there was romance on the cards, and believed that it was "clear" that Walter was "very pleased" by Pearl's arrival. However, she added that Pearl would have to "contend" with Walter's family, and believed that she had taken her promise to look after the family "seriously". Alice Penwill from Inside Soap wrote that she wanted to see more of the "Anderson ladies" as she believed that Pearl, Zoe and Sharon were all "brilliant". Joe Anderton from Digital Spy believed that Pearl was "stuck between a rock and a hard place" when she was having a dilemma over where to reveal where DeMarcus was hiding. Stephen Patterson from Metro believed that Pearl being reported by Zoe was a "huge portrayal" and questioned whether Pearl could forgive Zoe and if she would face prison. Anderton from Digital Spy called it a "shock arrest" and believed that viewers would be surprised. Sarah Ellis from Inside Soap wrote that Pearl was "thrust upon" Martine and that she got her feet "well and truly" under the table in the Deveraux house. Ellis later called Jack and Pearl's relationship the "hottest new romance in Hollyoaks", and added that they proved that it was not just "young'uns who can make a public display of affection" due to their "shock smooch" in the middle of the pub. She added that their pair have a "blossoming romance". Daniel Kilkelly from Digital Spy believed that there was "clearly" chemistry between Pearl and Jack and commented, "Romance is in the air". Kilkelly also believed that Pearl was proving to be a "good sounding board" for Frankie when they began working in the shop together. The abuse storyline that Pearl and Frankie were involved in was well received by viewers. In 2025, Joe Anderton from Digital Spy called Pearl and Jack's brief split a "heartbreaking twist" and branded them a "beloved couple". Later that year, Chloe Timms from Inside Soap wrote that she could not wait for Pearl and Jack's wedding.
