= Garcia Brown =

British actress (born 1993 or 1994)

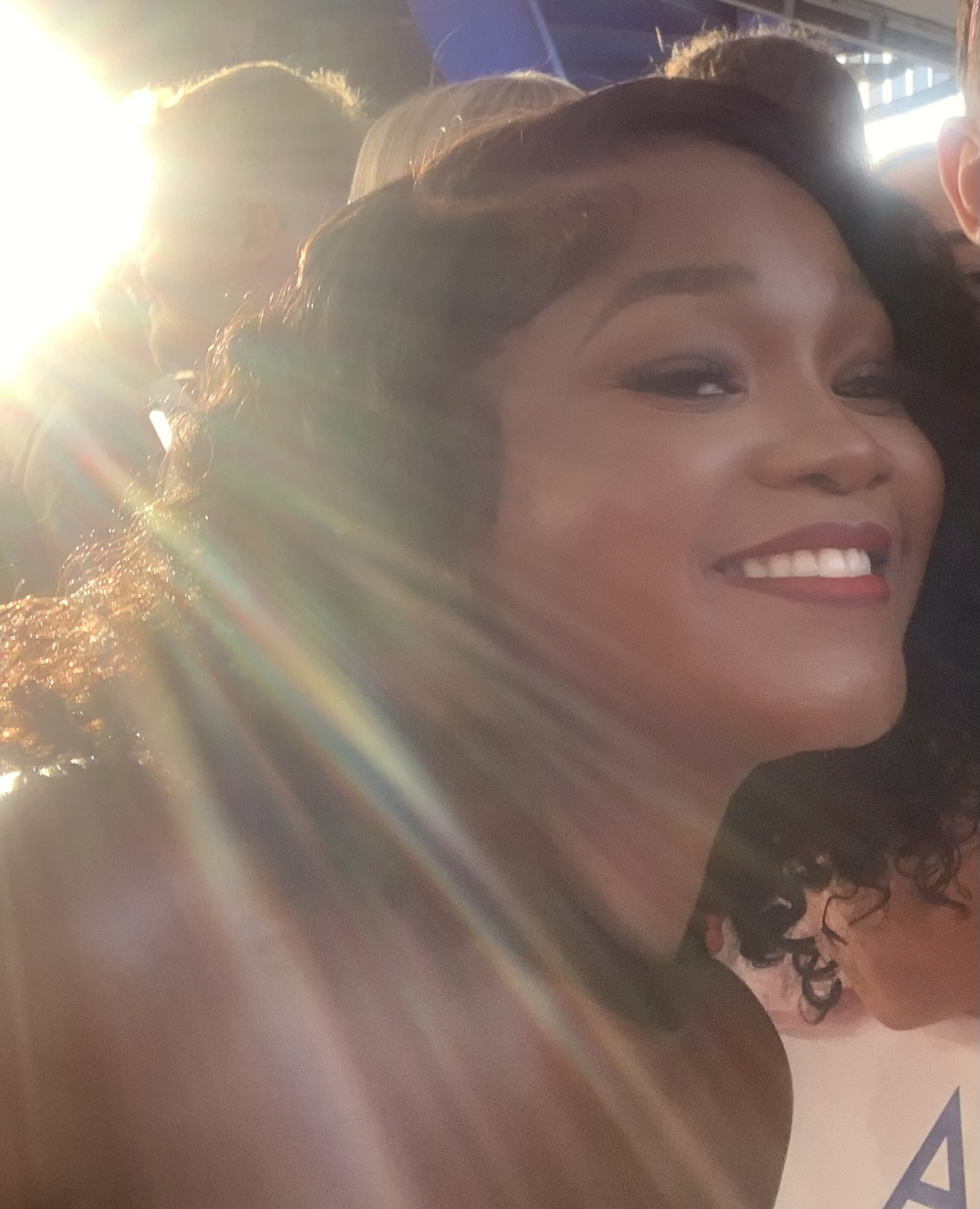
- Born: 1993 or 1994 (age 32–33)
- Occupation: Actress
- Years active: 2012–
- Television: Hollyoaks

Garcia Alicia Brown (born 1993 or 1994) is a British actress. She loved performing in talents shows as a child and was subsequently invited to join a weekend drama company, which led to her getting an agent years later. When she was 17 years old, she guest-starred in a 2012 episode of Shameless, which marked her television debu. She subsequently appeared in the series A Lesson Learnt (2015), the films The Weekend (2016) and Another Life (2017), the short film Repost (2017) and the children's audio comedy-drama series King Frank and the Knights of the Eco Quest! (2021). In 2021, Brown was cast as Zoe Anderson in the British soap opera Hollyoaks, with her first appearance airing in February 2022. She continued appearing as a regular character until January 2025 and was nominated for several awards for the role. Brown also portrayed a leading role in the 2023 horror film A Song From The Dark and also founded the beauty brand "I Lust Beauty".

== Early life ==
Garcia Brown was born in 1993 or 1994. Brown's parents broke up when she was young, which she initially found difficult. Brown remained with her mother and her new partner. Brown was an only child until she was 13 years old. As a child, her parents made sure that she was always active with hobbies and activities as they tried to shelter her, and she liked writing stories and considered herself a creative person. She also took both swimming and gymnastic lessons as a child. She used to take part in talent shows at her school, and when she was eight years old, her school told her mother that a drama company wanted Brown to join so she started going every weekend, and she stopped attending swimming and gymnastics as they clashed. She enjoyed being part of the drama company and taking part in productions there, including adaptations of Little Shop of Horrors and Bugsy Malone.

== Career ==
After appearing in the adaptation of Bugsy Malone when she was about 15 years old, she got her first agent, which led to her later getting her first television credit when she was 17 and in college, when she guest-starred as Keisha in the tenth episode of the ninth series of the British comedy drama television series Shameless, which originally aired on 6 March 2012. Brown had initially auditioned for another role in Shameless and was working in Hollister when she received the call that she got the role. She enjoyed working on Shameless and this made her realise that she wanted to pursue acting as a career. She starred in the television series A Lesson Learnt in 2015, and also appeared in the 2016 comedy film The Weekend and the 2017 movie In Another Life. Brown also starred as the lead role in the Godiva short film Repost, which was made to raise awareness of county lines drug trafficking.

In February 2022, it was announced that Brown had joined the regular cast of the British soap opera Hollyoaks as new detective Zoe Anderson, the granddaughter of established character Pearl Anderson (Dawn Hope). Brown was cast in the role in 2021, after being rejected from a role in another production, which had made her feel the "lowest" she had felt in her career. Brown initially did not known that the role was for Hollyoaks, believing it was for a Netflix production instead, and after sending off a tape for the audition and then was invited by Hollyoaks to do another audition in the studio. Brown started working on the soap in October 2021 but had to keep her casting a secret, having signed a Non-Disclosure Agreement, and she struggled with not being able to tell those close to her and had to give excuses when she was invited to plans by her friends. Brown found joining the soap very "exhilarating", adding, "I didn't know what to expect coming into the show but I felt right at home the moment I got here, and I'm super excited for what's in store." Brown used to watch Hollyoaks when she was at school and noted "Everytime someone asks me about Hollyoaks, I can't help but smile!" Within a few months of joining the soap, she became good friends with her colleagues Hope, Eva O'Hara (who played Verity Hutchinson) and Jorgie Porter (who plays Theresa McQueen). Brown's first episode as Zoe aired on 18 February 2022.

During Brown's stint on the soap, Zoe's storylines included a relationship with Sam Chen-Williams (Matthew McGivern) and its breakdown, her work in the police and the conflict it causes with her family, her fractured relationship with her mother Sharon Bailey (Jamelia), having an abortion, being a suspect in the murder of Rayne Royce (Jemma Donovan), dating Hunter McQueen (Theo Graham) and cheating on him with his brother Prince McQueen (Malique Thompson-Dwyer), and giving birth to Hunter's baby prematurely. Brown was excited to work with Jamelia, having watched her on television when she was younger, and the pair developed a bond with her offscreen, with Brown calling Jamelia her "soul family". Brown was longlisted for "Best Newcomer" at the 2022 Inside Soap Awards for her role as Zoe, although she did not make the shortlist. Later that year, she came third for "Best Soap Newcomer" at the 2022 Digital Spy Reader Awards. At the 2023 British Soap Awards, the scene where Zoe tells abused Maxine Minniver (Nikki Sanderson) that it is not her fault was nominated for "Scene of the Year". Brown later left the soap and her exit originally aired on 21 January 2025.

Brown portrayed Sammy Williams in the 2023 Nigerian horror film A Song From The Dark. Peace Oseyenum and Brown's performances in the scene where Sammy is possessed by Anioji were praised by Kolapo Mustapha from Nollywood Reinvented. Brown also voiced Catrain in the children's comedy-audio drama podcast series King Frank and the Knights of the Eco Quest! Additionally, Brown founded the beauty brand "I Lust Beauty", which specialises in vegan eye beauty products.

== Personal life ==
Brown has said that she is really into "visualisation and manifesting" and believed that it helped her successful obtain her Hollyoaks role. Brown considers music a significant part of who she is and she likes to make people laugh. She also said in a 2022 interview that she considers herself a workaholic but likes self-care. Early on in her stint on Hollyoaks, Brown was given some time off after the death of two of her close friends who she considered were like brothers to her.

== Acting credits ==
=== Filmography ===
Year	Title	Role	Notes	Ref.
2012	Shameless	Keisha	1 episode (Series 9, episode 10)	
2015	A Lesson Learnt	Dior	Television series	
2016	The Weekend	Shop assistant	Comedy film	
2017	Repost	Sasha	Short film	
2017	Another Life	Ganet	Film	
2021	King Frank and the Knights of the Eco Quest!	Catrain	Comedy-drama audio drama	
2022–25	Hollyoaks	Zoe Anderson	Regular role	
2023	A Song From The Dark	Sammy Williams	Horror film	

== Awards and nominations ==
List of acting awards and nominations
Year	Award	Category	Nominated work	Result	Ref.
2022	Inside Soap Awards	Best Newcomer	Hollyoaks	Longlisted	
2022	Digital Spy Reader Awards	Best Soap Newcomer	Hollyoaks	Shortlisted	
2023	The British Soap Awards	Scene of the Year	Zoe Tells Abused Maxine "It's not your fault" (Hollyoaks)	Nominated	
