= Trevor A. Toussaint =

British actor (1960–2026)

- Born: Trevor Albert Toussaint; 4 October 1960
- Died: 11 January 2026 (aged 65)
- Occupation: Actor
- Years active: 1970s-2026
- Television: Hollyoaks

Trevor Albert Toussaint (4 October 1960 – 11 January 2026) was a British actor. His acting career began in the 1970s, appearing in numerous theatre productions across the UK. His later career saw him embark on screen projects, and from 2018 to 2022, he portrayed Walter Deveraux in the Channel 4 soap opera Hollyoaks. Toussaint died on 11 January 2026, aged 65.

== Life and career ==
Trevor Albert Toussaint was born on 4 October 1960. He began his acting career in the 1970s, when Black actors were often typecast as criminals. For over ten years, he wore waist-length dreadlocks, which he was asked to cut off for a high-profile role; Toussaint refused. The majority of Toussaint's career was predominantly based in British theatre, with roles including The Bubbly Black Girl Sheds Her Chameleon Skin, Sister Act, Mass Carib, Rebellion, The Harder They Come, 125th Street, Kismet, Snow White and the Seven Dwarfs and Elegies for Angels, Punks and Raging Queens. Kéllé Bryan was Toussaint's agent for over twenty years.

In his later career, Toussaint began exploring screen roles, with his television debut airing in a 2016 episode of Death in Paradise. In 2018, he was cast as Walter Deveraux in the Channel 4 soap opera Hollyoaks. He was introduced as the father of established characters Simone Loveday (Jacqueline Boatswain) and Martine Deveraux (Kéllé Bryan); Bryan remained Toussaint's agent whilst they co-starred together. In 2022, in previously unannounced scenes, Toussaint made his final appearance as Walter. Throughout his tenure, he appeared in 147 episodes of the soap. In 2023, he appeared in an episode of Dreaming Whilst Black. Toussaint died on 11 January 2026, aged 65. Numerous of Toussaint's colleagues paid tributes to him via social media, including former agent and on-screen daughter Bryan, co-stars Nikki Sanderson,Jessica Fox, Richard Blackwood and Rishi Nair.

== Filmography ==
Year	Title	Role	Notes
2015	Karma	Collector	Short film
2016	Death in Paradise	Cedrik Verga	Guest role
2018	Jerk	—N/a	Short film
2018–2022	Hollyoaks	Walter Deveraux	Regular role
2018	Nine Nights	The Sage	Film
2020	Sulphur and White	Pastor Henry	Film
2023	Dreaming Whilst Black	Freddie	Episode: "The Reality"
