= Freya Calder =

- Hollyoaks character
- Portrayed by: Ellie Henry
- Duration: 2022–24
- First appearance: 23 March 2022
- Last appearance: 15 July 2024
- Introduced by: Lucy Allan
In-universe information
- Occupation: Student
- Father: Carter Shepherd
- Mother: Lexi Calder

Freya Calder is a fictional character from the British soap opera Hollyoaks, played by Ellie Henry. She made her first appearance on 23 March 2022. Freya was introduced as a classmate of Mason Chen-Williams (Frank Kauer) at Hollyoaks High School and upon her debut, she is involved in a mini-bus crash caused by John Paul McQueen's (James Sutton) withdrawal symptoms from his alcoholism. Freya is severely injured and unable to walk again after the crash, and as a disabled actor, Henry felt privileged to tell Freya's story. The actress also thought it was incredible to be involved in a stunt so quickly after joining the soap. Freya is also revealed to be the daughter of existing character Detective Lexi Calder (Natalie Anderson), who then targets John Paul and his family for his role in the crash. After Silas Blissett (Jeff Rawle) murders Lexi, Freya is last seen in October 2022.

In June 2023, it was reported that Henry had reported as Freya and the character's returned aired the following month, which coincided with the introduction of Freya's father, Carter Shepherd (David Ames). Henry was happy to return to the soap and teased that the character had had a little transformation during her time offscreen. Freya's storylines subsequently included her return to Hollyoaks High School, a crush on her art teacher Hunter McQueen (Theo Graham), lying to the police that she shared a kiss with Hunter, flirting and having sex with Dillon Ray (Nathaniel Dass) and reporting Carter's whereabouts to the police after finding out he has been conducting conversion therapy. Freya was later written out of the soap again and her final appearance aired on 15 July 2024, when she leaves to live abroad with Scott Drinkwell (Ross Adams). Critics noted how Freya's difficult time during her first stint on Hollyoaks, and Henry revealed that she had seen viewers online that thought Freya could be together romantically with Mason, which she agreed with.

== Development ==
=== Introduction and crash ===
The character of Freya was announced in March 2022, it was reported that she would catch "the eye" of Mason Chen-Williams (Frank Kauer). Her first appearance aired on 23 March 2022. Freya is introduced as a student of Hollyoaks High School and she is featured in a stunt soon upon her debut. That same month, it was announced that Hollyoaks would feature a mini-bus crash in upcoming episodes which would cause "life-changing consequences" and "devastating injuries", and upon the airing of the episodes, it transpired to be Freya who is injured in the crash. In the storyline, deputy headteacher John Paul McQueen (James Sutton) is driving the minibus to transport Freya and other schoolchildren on their camping trip, but he falls asleep at the wheel due to effects of his ongoing alcoholism which causes the minibus to spin off the road. As his colleague Olivia Bradshaw (Emily Burnett) rounds up the students, Mason realises that Freya has been left behind and is trapped under the camping luggage inside the minibus and cannot feel her legs. Mason "desperately" tries to pull Freya out of the wreckage but is unable to. When the paramedics arrive, Freya is prioritised getting to the hospital and tests are performed on her at the hospital to see what the repercussions are. It is revealed that John Paul is not drunk but fell asleep due to his withdrawal symptoms, and he lies that the crash was caused when a bird flew towards the windscreen, though he considers handing himself into the police.

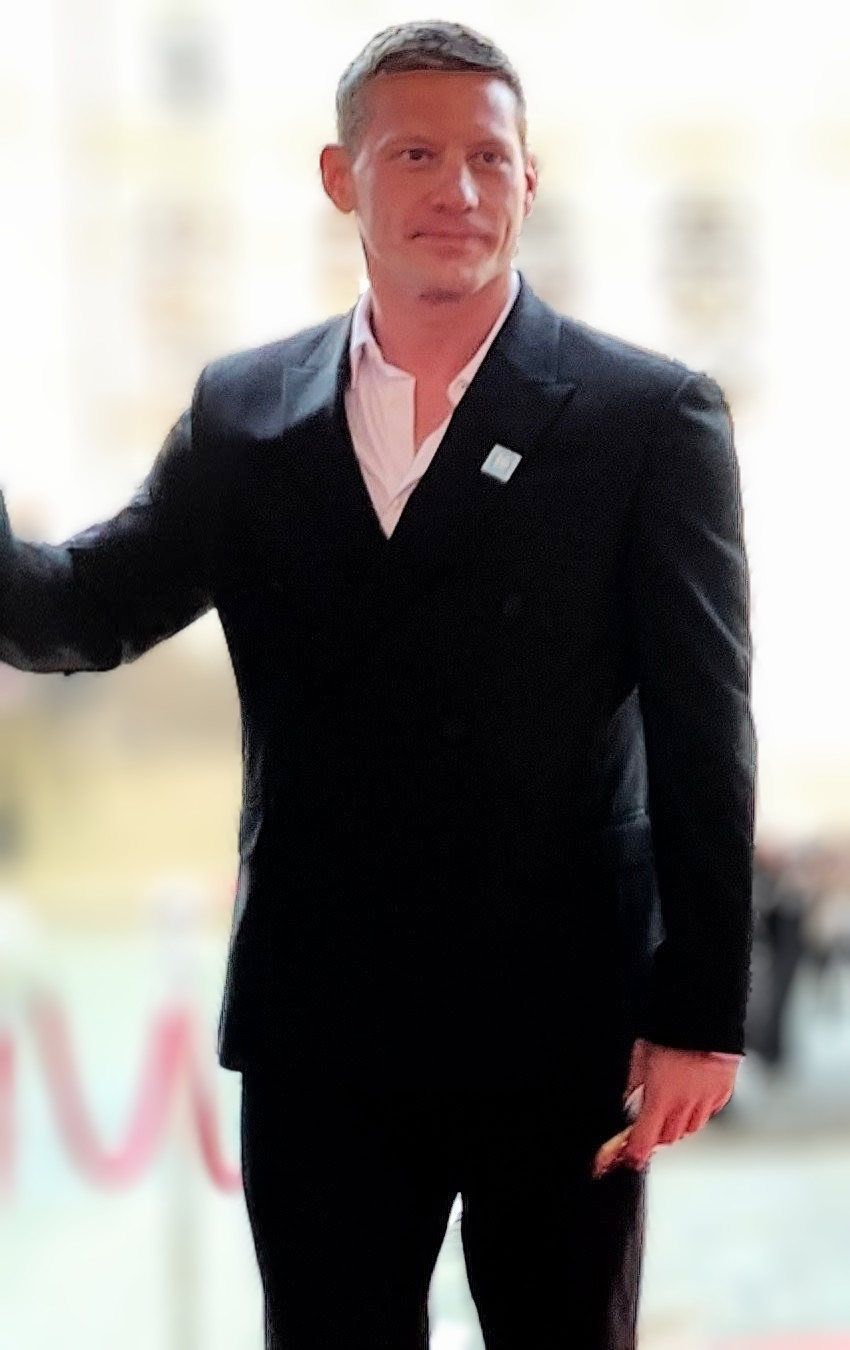
Freya's initial storylines sees her injured in a bus crashed caused by John Paul McQueen, played by James Sutton (pictured)

John Paul quickly goes to the hospital to see how Freya is doing, and he meets Freya's mother, who is revealed to be existing character Detective Lexi Calder (Natalie Anderson), when she arrives at the hospital. Lexi tells John Paul that Freya is undergoing more tests and she is struggling to cope with her daughter being in hospital. Hollyoaks bosses had previously confirmed that Lexi is Freya's mother; Anderson had debuted as Lexi in 2021 and it was announced upon Freya's debut that Lexi would be returning to the soap and would have a bigger connection to the village due to being Freya's mother.

It was soon after confirmed by Hollyoaks that Freya's injuries would be life-changing. After the crash, Freya is told that she will have to use a wheelchair and that she will not make a full recovery, and the episodes show Freya dealing with this. Of the issue-based storyline, Henry said, "To join the cast of Hollyoaks and be thrown straight into filming a stunt has been incredible, and unlike anything I could've imagined. Freya has so much to come to terms with after the crash and, as a disabled actor, I feel privileged to be able to tell her story. I've had a wonderful time filming so far and have already learnt a great deal from other actors who I've been fortunate enough to work closely with. I am beyond excited for you all to see what we've been working on." Henry uses a wheelchair in real life. In 2023, Henry said that she believed that stories written and informed by disabled people is essential for disability representation and hoped that other media would follow in the footsteps of soap operas. Of representing the disabled community, she said, "I feel the need to show people what they expect to see to represent well, but most people haven't seen a disabled person like me before, sometimes using a wheelchair and sometimes appearing completely healthy, so I am constantly questioning whether the choices I make for myself align with aiding the community in moving forward. The best way I can represent is to be authentically myself and be prepared to explain to people what they don't yet understand". She added that there are a lot of "nuances to the experience of being a teenager or young adult in this world and the insecurities that come with that which are only amplified and added to with disability in the mix".

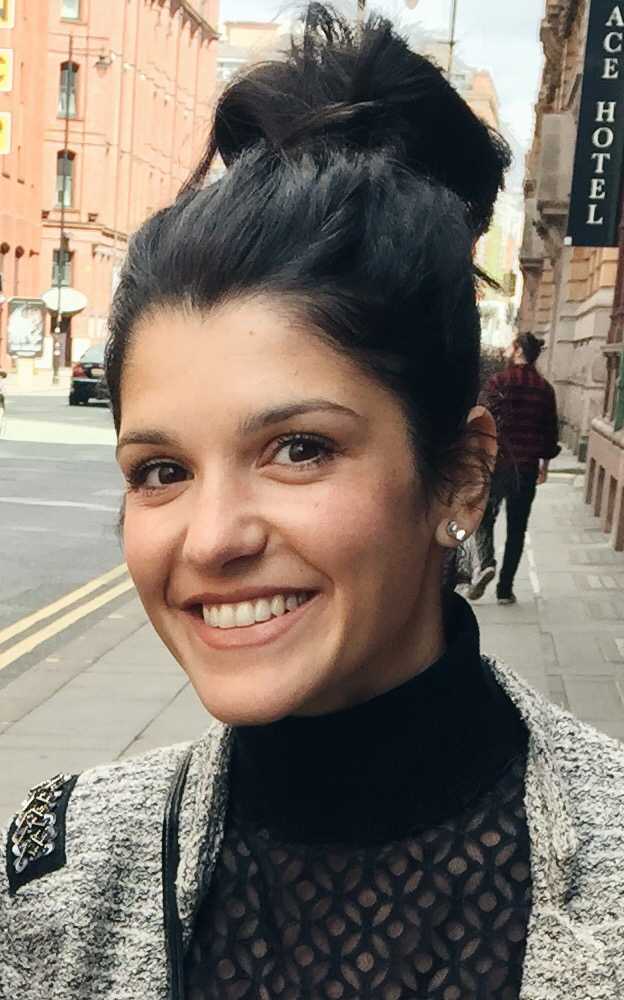
Natalie Anderson (pictured) played Freya's mother, Lexi Calder

John Paul struggles with his guilt and he visits Freya after finding out that she may not be able to walk again. As they talk, Freya gets a text message regarding her netball tournament, which she adds to the list of things she might be unable to do again. John Paul's guilt overwhelms him to the point that he "obscurely" admits that the crash was his fault. He struggles to keep his guilt secret and even considers telling Lexi the truth, but he does not. However, he later finds a note in his pocket saying "I know what you did, Mr McQueen". The blackmailer is later revealed to be Olivia, who wants to take John Paul's job. The pressure of the blackmail causes John Paul to drink again; he later turns up to Freya's fundraising event drunk, and as Freya is making a speech there, he comes on the stage and takes the microphone from her.

Freya is devastated when she finds out that her paralysis is due to John Paul's alcohol withdrawal symptoms causing the crash. Lexi then torments John Paul and his family for causing the accident that injured Freya, with Lexi's actions including writing them threats and throwing a brick into their home as part of her vendetta. Lexi does her best to support Freya with her injuries. However, Lexi is later murdered by serial killer Silas Blissett (Jeff Rawle) when she tries to protect the McQueen family from him. Freya then last appears in October 2022.

=== Return ===
In June 2023, it was announced that Henry had returned to the soap as Freya. It was reported that she would be back in Hollyoaks High for prom and reunite with her school friends. It was also reported that Freya would become a more prominent character and that her return would lead to John Paul coming "face to face with his mistakes". Henry was really happy to return to Hollyoaks, and teased, "Last year saw a lot of life-changing events for Freya. She is now navigating life as a disabled young person without her mum, which gives us so much to explore. She's also had a little transformation in the time she's been away, which is exciting. We have so much coming up this year that I cannot wait for people to see!" Freya's return came after it was announced that David Ames had joined the cast as Carter Shepherd, Freya's father. Her return coincided with the introduction of Carter, who becomes the headteacher of Hollyoaks High School and moves to Hollyoaks as he wants to build a relationship with Freya. Freya's return aired on 10 July 2023, where she attends the Hollyoaks High School prom, and she meets Dillon Ray (Nathaniel Dass), who gets to know her. Freya tells her classmates that she is back for good. It was reported by Digital Spy that Freya would be "looking to the future" after having had a difficult period the previous year. When John Paul meets Carter, he tells Carter that he still blames himself for Freya's accident but Carter tells him to not be too hard on himself, though John Paul is unaware that he is her father. John Paul is horrified when he finds out their relation, though Carter tells him he forgives him for the accident.

=== Crush on Hunter ===
Upon Freya's return, it was reported that she would try to get closer to the McQueen family when she attends Hunter McQueen's (Theo Graham) summer art class. Freya appears to like Hunter, though she is not pleased when she finds out he is part of the McQueen family. She shows Hunter a picture of a creature that is similar to an alien and says that is how she feels. Hunter is impressed with Freya's talent but after he takes one of her pictures home, he realises that she is the student that was injured by John Paul's crash. When John Paul learns of this, he encourages Freya to continue attending the art class in order to have an outlet to process the traumatic events she has endured. Freya is then seen watching the McQueen household from behind a bush. Hunter confides about his past to Freya and offers to draw Lexi, which concerns John Paul; Hunter is then warned by Sally St. Claire (Annie Wallace) about getting close to Freya during her grief.

Hunter finds out that Freya has romantic feelings for him when she sends him a romantic mix tape with a message; he initially believes it is from his new love interest Zoe Anderson (Garcia Brown) but then finds out the CD and the romantically suggestive message is from Freya. When Hunter and Zoe are on a date, Freya excitedly joins them uninvited, unaware that she is intruding, and Hunter is initially annoyed but becomes awkward and concerned when Freya reveals that she sent the mix tape. Freya believes that there are feelings between her and Hunter and buys him gifts, and Hunter then tells Freya that they only have a student-teacher relationship, but Freya refuses to believe it and confesses her love for him; she also says that their relationship is similar to the one Hunter had with his own teacher Neeta Kaur (Amrit Maghera) years prior. Hunter is "horrified" and tells Freya this is not true, but she storms off and does not accept what Hunter is telling her. However, a video of their conversation is secretly filmed by Rayne Royce (Jemma Donovan), who edits the video to make it look like they are in an inappropriate relationship and posts it online. The video is spread and this causes gossip to arise regarding Freya and Hunter's connection. Hunter tells headteacher Carter about the video and says it is a misunderstanding, unaware that Carter is Freya's father; Carter reports the matter to the police as he wants action taken, and hence Zoe questions Freya. Freya then claims that Hunter kissed her and he subsequently gets suspended and questioned by the police, though he blames himself for Freya's feelings. Freya then admits to Zoe that she lied about the kiss and that she wanted Hunter to love her like she loves him, and the situation subsequently makes Hunter think about his past relationship with Neeta.

=== Romances and Carter's arrest ===
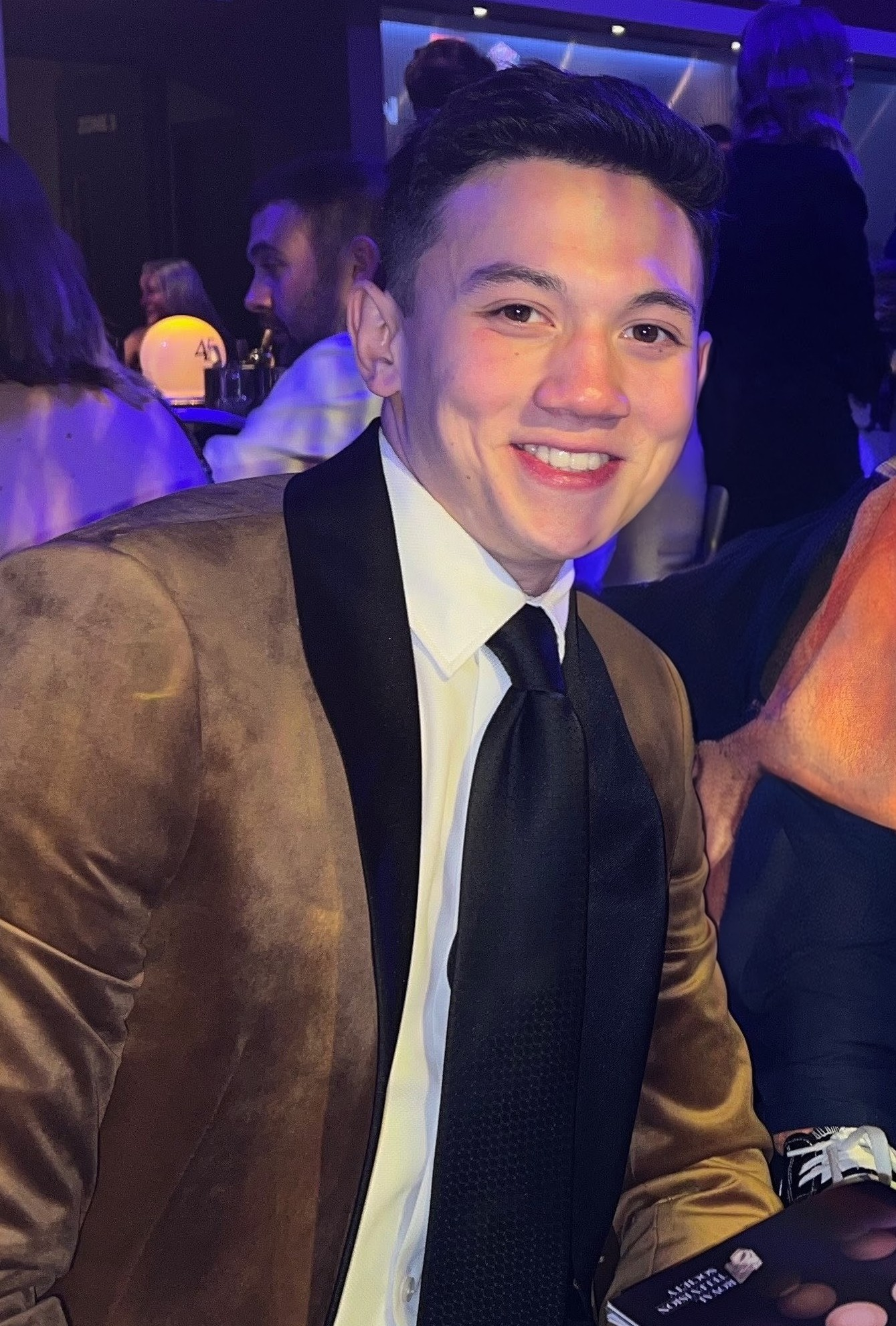
Henry wanted Freya to be a love interest of Mason Chen-Williams, played by Frank Kauer (pictured)

After the end of Freya's storyline with Hunter, Henry told Inside Soap that she wanted Freya to "go for someone her own age next time". She also told the magazine that she would love to see Freya with Mason as they had "such a nice little bond" during Freya's initial stint. She added, "Freya missed [Mason] going through all the incel stuff [storyline], and they used to be close. Both of them have been through a lot and need some happiness. I've seen some of the fans online think the same".

In one storyline, Dillon kisses Freya during a game of Spin the bottle during a gathering at Freya and Carter's flat following the funeral of their friend Ella Richardson (Erin Palmer), which makes fellow teenager Lucas Hay (Oscar Curtis) jealous as he has romantic feelings for Dillon, which Dillon reciprocates. When Lucas sees Dillon flirting with Freya at school, he retaliates by telling Carter about their drinking at his flat, and Carter reprimands the students. Lucas admits that he does not feel okay about Dillon kissing Freya and the pair plan to meet later that evening to talk about their connection, but Dillon later believes that he has been stood up when Lucas is late. Freya then turns up at Dillon's house and, after discussing their kiss, end up having sex, which Lucas is devastated about when he finds out. Lucas is later targeted by Carter, who uses conversion therapy on him.

Freya later finds out about Carter's homophobia and that has been conducting conversion therapy on Lucas at school, who he also tries to kidnap. At the Hollyoaks Pride celebrations, Freya is horrified when she witnesses Carter shouting homophobic hatred at the guests through the microphone. Carter pleads with Freya to come with him to the USA and arranges to meet with her later. Freya is then by Dillon's bedside as he wakes up after being attacked by Lucas, and Dillon urges Freya to be wary of Carter. Carter is then arrested after Freya gives the police his whereabouts, and she tearfully urges her father to accept responsibility for his crimes. In real life, Henry and Ames (Carter's portrayer) became good friends, with Henry writing on Instagram, "Having someone walk into your life and brighten every day is the biggest blessing. I truly believe that we are a collage of the best parts of our favourite people, and I am so happy [Ames] has become part of me and my life".

=== Departure ===
On 3 July 2024, it was reported that Freya would be leaving Hollyoaks in upcoming episodes. Freya's exit storyline coincided with that of Scott Drinkwell's (Ross Adams), whose departure had been announced months prior. Their exits came among several other cast members being written out of the soap during that period. In the storyline, Freya lives with Scott following Carter's arrest. Scott leaves Hollyoaks to pursue his dream abroad, and Freya surprises him when she asks to go with him following her father's imprisonment, saying that she needs a fresh start after all the things she has been through. Scott ends up leaving before Freya but arranges to meet her at the airport. Freya's last episode aired on 15 July 2024, which saw Freya preparing to leave to join Scott in Spain, and she is sent off by Vicky Grant (Anya Lawrence) and the Hutchinson family.

== Storylines ==
Freya befriends Mason Chen-Williams (Frank Kauer) at Hollyoaks High School and intends to go on a camping trip with him and other classmates. Whilst driving there, teacher John Paul McQueen (James Sutton) briefly loses his concentration and ends up causing the minibus to flip over. Freya is injured badly in the crash and is rushed to hospital, where tests reveal that she may not be able to walk again due to being paralysed. John Paul feels guilty about causing the crash due to the withdrawal symptoms from his alcoholism, and he arranges a fundraiser for Freya. However, there the truth about the crash is revealed, and Freya's mother Lexi Calder (Natalie Anderson) is furious with John Paul. Freya is initially devastated by this revelation but does not allow her mother to prosecute him, and Freya later forgives John Paul. Freya leaves the village after Lexi is killed by serial killer Silas Blissett (Jeff Rawle).

Freya returns to the village the following year and reintegrates with her friends at Hollyoaks High, and she begins living with her father Carter Shepherd (David Ames). She begins attending Hunter McQueen's (Theo Graham) art classes and develops a crush on Hunter, her teacher, sending him a mixtape of songs. Freya admits her feelings for Hunter but he rejects her, which she refuses to accept; Hunter is then questioned by the police after Rayne Royce (Jemma Donovan) films this interaction and edits it to look like they are having an illegal relationship. Freya initially lies to the police that she and Hunter kissed, but later admits that it was a lie. After the funeral of their friend Ella Richardson (Erin Palmer), Freya kisses, flirts with and later has sex with Dillon Ray (Nathaniel Dass), which upsets Lucas Hay (Oscar Curtis) as he has feelings for Dillon. Freya is devastated when she finds out that her father has been conducting conversion therapy on Lucas and reports his whereabouts to the police, telling him to take responsibility for his actions. Following Carter's arrest, Freya lives with Scott Drinkwell (Ross Adams), the foster father of her friend Vicky Grant (Anya Lawrence). Freya then leaves the village to live with Scott in Spain.

== Reception ==
Henry noticed that some viewers online thought that Freya and Mason could be together romantically. Tess Lamacraft from What to Watch dubbed the crash that Freya was involved in a "horrific minibus smash", whilst Naomi Clarke from the Belfast Telegraph called the injuries that it caused "devastating". Daniel Kilkelly from Digital Spy dubbed the crash as being dramatic. Kilkelly's colleague, Justin Harp, noted that the stunt "really gave viewers the first chance to get to know" Freya and called her injuries a "powerful storyline". Kilkelly later noted how Freya had had a "tough time" due to the minibus crash and her mother's murder.

Upon Freya's return, Stefania Sarrubba from Digital Spy noted Freya's various connections to the McQueen family and called her return a "surprise". Writing for Radio Times, Sarrubba noted how Lexi's murder by Silas was "something more sinister" that connected the McQueen family to Freya, and she questioned whether Freya would get close with the family. George Lewis from the same website thought that Carter's motives for meeting John Paul were "all the more unclear" when it was revealed he was Freya's father. Harriet Mitchell from Digital Spy believed that Freya's lie about Hunter kissing her was a "shocking twist". Brenna Cooper from the same website called Hunter's discovery of Freya's romantic feelings for him "disturbing", and she later opined that Freya's admission about her lie over the kiss a "shock twist". When Freya was seen watching the McQueen household from behind a bush, Stephen Patterson from Metro speculated that she could have ulterior motives for attending Hunter's art class and hinted that it could be a "seriously dark storyline". Later, after Freya is questioned by the police over her relationship with Hunter, Patterson called it an "intense showdown" and questioned whether Freya would say the truth or not. Patterson also noted how Freya had a "number of life-changing ordeals" in 2022 and that she "got the wrong end of the stick" as she believed that there was a romantic connection between her and Hunter. Kilkelly noted that Freya initially was in "no hurry to clear" Hunter's name, and also called the video circulating a "scandal at Hollyoaks High". Kilkelly's colleague, George Lewis, opined that the storyline got "complicated" when Freya lied about the kiss.

Sue Haasler from Metro opined that the scene where Freya begs Carter to take responsibility for his actions was powerful, and cited this as the reason of Henry "a huge part in the conversion therapy storyline". Dan Laurie from Manchester Evening News called the news of Freya's exit a "surprising turn of events" and opined that she and Scott were two "Hollyoaks favourites". He also noted how Freya had faced "significant heartbreak" during her time in Hollyoaks, citing the bus crash, the death of her mother and discovering that her father was conducting conversion therapy, and believed that Freya wanting to leave with Scott was an "unexpected twist". Sara Baalla from Digital Spy called Freya one of the soap's "major characters". Patterson from Metro opined that Freya had an "emotional few years" during her time in the soap; of her decision to leave the village, he wrote, "Even by Hollyoaks standards, Freya has suffered a lot of heartbreak since arriving in the village [...] No wonder she needs a fresh start!"
