= Chris Charles (actor) =

British actor

- Education: Middlesex University
- Occupation: Actor
- Years active: 2014–
- Television: Hollyoaks

Chris Charles is a British actor. He wanted to be an actor since he was a child and was supported by his mother to achieve it, getting his first professional role when he was about 12 or 13 years old. He graduated from Middlesex University with a degree in Drama and Theatre Studies and later took a short break from acting. He subsequently appeared in various plays, such as Rising Damp (2014), War Horse (2017–19) and Peter Pan (2019–20), amongst others. He also made guest appearances in various television shows, including the soap operas Doctors (2016) and EastEnders (2019), in addition to various films, short films and other productions. Between 2021 and 2022, he played Saul Reeves on the British soap opera Hollyoaks. After the character was killed off, Charles has appeared in the films Reach! (2023), Everyone (2023) and Voidance (2026), in addition to the short films Blabbermouth (2024) and Hangman (2026).

== Life and career ==
Chris Charles is from London. He wanted to be an actor since he was about 10 years old, and after telling his mother that he wanted to act, she helped him with the goal. Charles got his first professional job a couple of years later. He attended Middlesex University between 2006 and 2009 and graduated with a 2:1 degree in Drama and Theatre Studies. He also has done some training at the British Action Academy. Charles took a short break from acting, explaining, "I did take a little break from it in my early twenties as I had been doing a lot. I'd been performing from an early age, up until 21 or 22. I took a little break out for a couple of years and got back into it in my mid-twenties. I've never looked back since". Charles played Philip in the stage production of Rising Damp at the Floral Pavilion Theatre in 2014. Catherine Jones from the Liverpool Echo wrote that Charles "suitably public school enunciation as Philip, the 'chief' of his tribe" in the production.

"Doing guest roles on EastEnders and Doctors gave me an appetite for the soap world. I definitely wanted to get into a soap and have a regular role – something meaty that I could actually sink my teeth into properly for a nice stint. I'm just thankful that Hollyoaks gave me the opportunity."

— Chris Charles on joining Hollyoaks (2021)

Charles guest-starred as Billy Cartwright in an episode of the BBC medical soap opera Doctors which was originally broadcast on 25 February 2016. Later that year, he was the understudy for Albert and Kevin in a stage production of Clybourne Park, which ran at the Mercury Theatre, Colchester between 8 and 23 April 2016. That same year, he appeared in an adaptation of Much Ado About Nothing at the Mercury Theatre, which ran from 30 September to 15 October 2016; Benjamin Powell from LondonTheatre1 wrote that Charles and Emmy Stonelake provided Polly Lister, who played Don John, "with strong support as her co-conspirators". In 2017, it was announced that Charles would play Joey/Topthorn Heart in the UK tour of the War Horse, which was produced by the National Theatre and ran at various theatres between September 2017 and February 2019. He had a guest appearance in the BBC soap opera EastEnders as Jerome in the episode that originally aired on 22 November 2019. Charles then played a pirate in stage production of Peter Pan, which ran at the Birmingham Repertory Theatre from 30 November 2019 to 19 January 2020.

In August 2021, it was announced that Charles had joined the cast of the British soap opera Hollyoaks as Nate Denby, with his first appearance originally airing on 6 September of that year. Of his casting, Charles said, "I'm absolutely thrilled and honoured to be joining such a legendary show and staple in British television. Words can't describe how blessed I feel or the level of excitement I have to get started and bring Nate to the village for all of our amazing audience. Let the drama begin!" Charles said that the audition process for Hollyoaks occurred "relatively quickly" within a few weeks; he received a breakdown of the role from his agents and sent in a self-tape before doing an in-person audition and a screen test straight afterwards. He had tried to not think about the role after his audition, explaining, "I'm one of those actors who does an audition or a casting, but then tries to forget about it. I get rid of the emails and I put it out of my mind, so I'm not sitting there dwelling on anything." He felt "stunned and elated" when he got the call that he had secured the role. He felt honoured to be part of the soap, telling Digital Spy, "Working on the show has been amazing. I'll be honest, professionally it's been the best experience of my life to date. Everyone at Hollyoaks is amazing – so friendly and welcoming". Shortly after his debut, Charles appeared in Episode 5675, originally broadcast on 10 September 2021, which was part of Channel 4's Black to Front initiative; Charles said he felt a lot of pride when he found out he would be in the episode, adding, "It's just such an honour to be part of that episode, which is such a historic and iconic moment". Charles' character was later revealed to be an undercover cop named Saul Reeves, who was using Nate as an alias. Charles later left the role when Saul was murdered in episodes that aired in July 2022 as part of a storyline about knife crime.

Charles played the lead role of King Rich in the 2023 film Reach! He also played Greg in the 2023 film Everyone. In 2024, it was reported that Charles would appear in the British Sci-fi thriller film Voidance. Charles played Sala in that film, which came out in 2026. Charles has also appeared in the short films Deadly Grounds (2014), Blabbermouth (2024) and Hangman (2026), the television series 24: Live Another Day (2014), Babylon (2014), Peaky Blinders (2014) and The Hollow Crown (2016), the film Day of the Sirens and the BBC Jam interactive video Shellshock. He also performed in the musical stage production Pack Up Your Troubles at the Cottesloe Theatre. He has also acted in stage adaptations of Julius Caesar, People Watching, Morelight and The Wonderful World of Dissocia.

== Acting credits ==
=== Filmography ===
Year	Title	Role	Notes	Ref.
Unknown	Shellshock	Jason	BBC Jam interactive video	
Unknown	Day of the Sirens	Mickey	Film	
2014	Deadly Grounds	Sergeant	Short film	
2014	Babylon	Rioter/Armed Response Police Officer	Special action	
2014	24: Live Another Day	CIA Tactical Assault Team	Special action	
2014	Peaky Blinders	Nightclub Brawler	Special action	
2016	The Hollow Crown	Soldier	Special action	
2016	Doctors	Billy Cartwright	Guest role (1 episode)	
2019	EastEnders	Jerome	Guest role (1 episode)	
2021–22	Hollyoaks	Saul Reeves	Regular role	
2023	Reach!	King Rich	Film	
2023	Everyone	Greg	Film	
2024	Blabbermouth	Uncle Paul	Short film	
2026	Voidance	Sala	Sci-fi thriller film	
2026	Hangman	Dane	Short film	

=== Theatre ===
Year	Production	Role	Venue(s)	Ref.
Unknown	Julius Caesar	Julius Caesar	Unknown	
Unknown	The Wonderful World of Dissocia	Vince	Unknown	
Unknown	Pack Up Your Troubles	Fast Eddie	Cottesloe Theatre	
Unknown	People Watching	Flipper Man	Unknown	
Unknown	Morelight	Convict	Unknown	
2014	Rising Damp	Philip	Floral Pavilion Theatre	
2016	Clybourne Park	Understudy Albert/Kevin	Mercury Theatre, Colchester	
2016	Much Ado About Nothing	Borachio/Balthasar	Mercury Theatre, Colchester	
2017–19	War Horse	Joey/Topthorn Heart	Various (UK tour)	
2019–20	Peter Pan	Pirate	Birmingham Repertory Theatre	
