= Episode 5675 (Hollyoaks) =

2021 episode of Hollyoaks

- Hollyoaks episode
- Episode no.: Episode 5675
- Directed by: Patrick Robinson
- Written by: Thabo Mhlatshwa
- Editing by: Sahil Gill; Jake Whiston
- Original air dates: 9 September 2021 (E4); 10 September 2021 (Channel 4)
- Running time: 60 minutes (including advertisements)

Episode chronology
← Previous "Episode 5674"	Next → "Episode 5676"

Episode 5675 of the British television soap opera Hollyoaks focuses on a birthday party for Walter Deveraux (Trevor A. Toussaint) and features an exclusively Black cast. The episode was produced, written and directed by Black creatives – the first of its kind for a British soap opera. The episode formed part of broadcaster Channel 4's Black to Front movement, a day where solely Black-fronted programming was shown. Plans for the episode were initially announced in August 2020 as a response to the protest movement arising from the murder of George Floyd. The episode premiered as a first-look on E4 on 9 September 2021, with its mainstream broadcast following a day later on Channel 4.

On 25 July 2021, the soap announced that production on the episode had commenced, with Thabo Mhlatshwa writing for the episode and Patrick Robinson directing; this marked Robinson's directorial debut for a continuing drama. Clothing for the episode was sourced from local Black-owned businesses and Black musicians were used for the score on the episode, with the production team incorporating both original scores and existing songs. It was also announced that the soap had cast five new Black cast members for the episode, all of whom would appear as series regulars from after the episode had aired. The characters were later confirmed to be Nate Denby (Chris Charles), Pearl Anderson (Dawn Hope), Olivia Bradshaw (Emily Burnett) and DeMarcus Westwood (Tomi Ade), as well as returning character Prince McQueen (Malique Thompson-Dwyer). Jamelia and DJ Target also guest starred in the episode.

== Plot ==
Martine Deveraux (Kéllé Bryan) receives a text from the hospital stating that she will receive the results from her recent MRI scan that day. She heads off to the party she is hosting for her father Walter (Trevor A. Toussaint). Unbeknownst to Martine, her daughter Celeste Faroe (Andrea Ali) has invited her father Felix Westwood (Richard Blackwood) in a bid to reunite her parents. When Felix arrives at the party, he explains that Walter demanded that he left Martine. Felix's estranged son DeMarcus (Tomi Ade) also arrives at the party and is asked to stay in the village by Felix. Stressed out from family drama, Martine goes canoeing in the river by the party. Felix follows her, but is followed by DeMarcus, who crashes his boat into Felix's and sends him underwater. He almost drowns, but is saved by Martine. The two later agree to reconcile their relationship. Pearl Anderson (Dawn Hope) speaks with Walter about his dead brother Wilfed, who killed himself due to facing persecution for being gay. Pearl informs a guilt-ridden Walter that while he can learn from the past, he should live in the present.

Ripley Lennox (Ki Griffin) meets with Brooke Hathaway (Tylan Grant), where the two confess their romantic feelings for each other. Brooke states that they would not kiss Ripley until the pair had been on at least three dates, so Ripley asks Brooke on three dates within the day. After the third date, the pair kiss. After Goldie McQueen (Chelsee Healey) learns that her son Prince (Malique Thompson-Dwyer) has become a vegan and wants to take Olivia Bradshaw's (Emily Burnett) surname after they get married, she feels he is ashamed of the McQueen family. Olivia then finds Prince eating a meat burger and he reveals that he has changed himself to appeal to her. In response, Olivia enlists Goldie's help to give her a makeover in order to look like a McQueen. While alone, Nate Denby (Chris Charles) lays out printed cards of numerous residents' social media profiles and picks up Felix's.

== Production ==
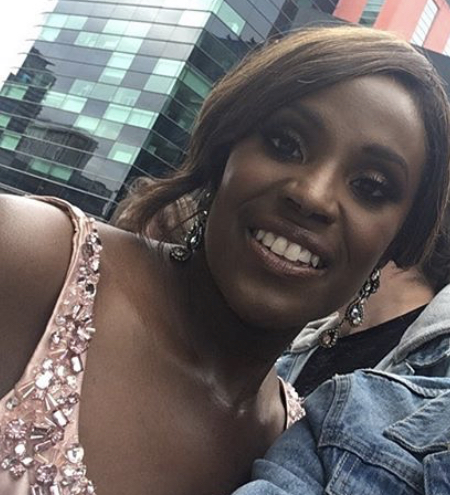
As well as appearing in the episode, Bryan served as a script consultant for the episode.

In August 2020, Hollyoaks' broadcaster, Channel 4, expressed their plan to host a Black Takeover Day, which was later renamed to Black to Front. For the day, Channel 4's flagship programming aired episodes starring and created by Black talent. The purpose of the initiative was to "amplify the conversations around representation and diversity" a year after the protest movement arising from the murder of George Floyd. The broadcaster worked with the Sir Lenny Henry Centre for Media Diversity for Black to Front. The centre stated that if the initiative were to be handled incorrectly, it would risk people believing that Channel 4 are attempting to capitalise on Black Lives Matter. Alongside programmes including The Big Breakfast, Countdown and Celebrity Gogglebox, it was confirmed that Hollyoaks would be included in the initiative. It was confirmed that the episode would have an extended runtime of 60 minutes and would solely feature Black cast members, as well as a predominantly Black production team. The clothing worn by cast members was also sourced from local Black-owned businesses. Grant, who portrays Brooke, commented that it was their favourite costumes to date. All of the music featured was performed by Black musicians, some suggested by cast members.

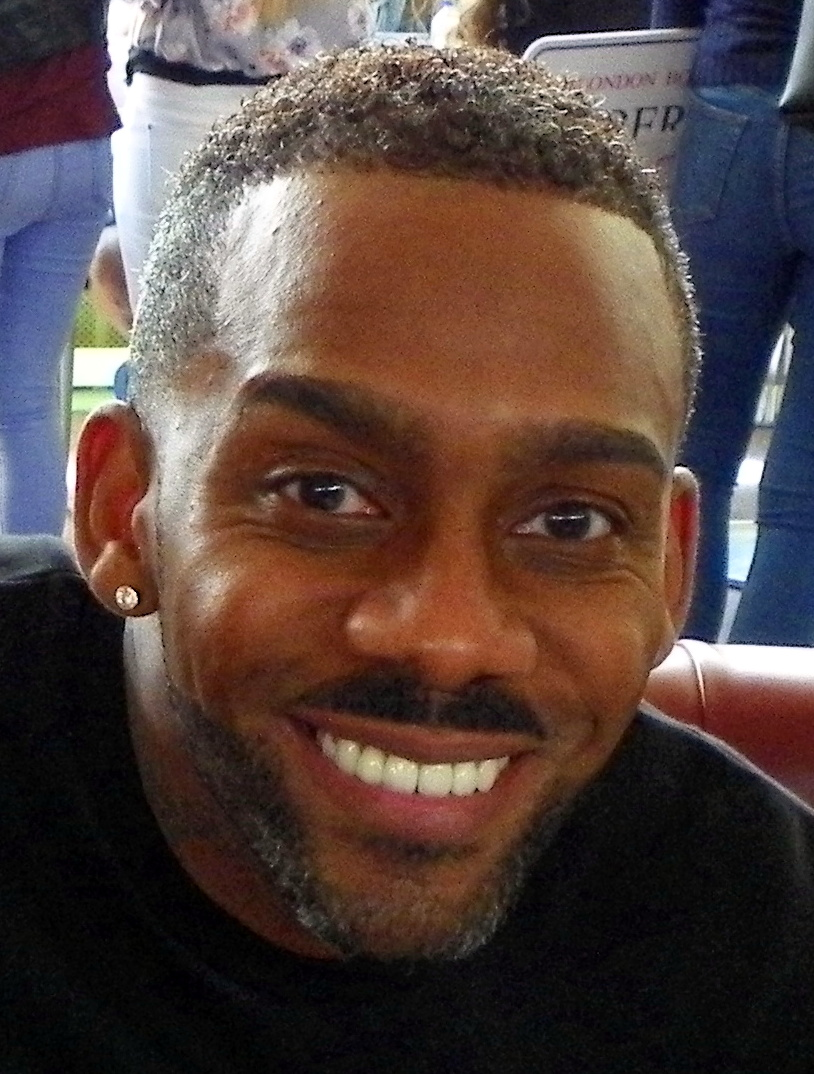
Blackwood felt that the episode was important to represent the multicultural society of the UK.

On 25 July 2021, it was confirmed by The Guardian that filming was underway. They revealed that the episode would be centred around Walter's birthday and that it would feature both new and existing Black characters. They also revealed that actor Patrick Robinson would be making his directorial debut on a continuing drama by directing. Bryan acted as a script consultant, alongside starring as Martine. In an interview with The Guardian, Hollyoaks' executive producer Lucy Allan stated that the team were prepared to receive criticism following the episode. However, Allan said that negative comments from viewers would not matter to her or the team and that people who do not understand the concept are "all the more reason" to execute it. Blackwood, who portrays Felix, was interviewed by Stephen Patterson of the Metro about the episode. He felt that since Black people are "not really on the screen", it was important to show equality onscreen. Blackwood added: "we live in a multicultural society and it needs to be represented".

A week before the episode aired, it was confirmed that a stunt involving Felix would take place. The production team hinted that the stunt could result in Felix's death. The stunt involved Blackwood's character almost drowning and being resurfaced from the water. Blackwood said that he enjoyed filming the stunt but that he found it difficult to put his head completely underwater. He wished that he could have performed the full stunt himself, feeling that seeing a stunt double film "takes away from the magic of being involved". As well as immersing himself underwater, Blackwood also found it difficult to act unconscious. He said that since breathing is the first instinct when emerging from water, it was hard to act like he had passed out, especially due to not being able to train for such a performance. Ade, who made his debut appearance as DeMarcus in the episode, found filming the stunt "crazy", owing his nervousness during the stunt to the fact that he cannot swim in real life. He was scared to be on the lake but confirmed that everyone involved in the production of the stunt was cautious and followed safety precautions. Due to the cold weather and water during the filming of the stunt, cast members who were involved had to wear wetsuits.

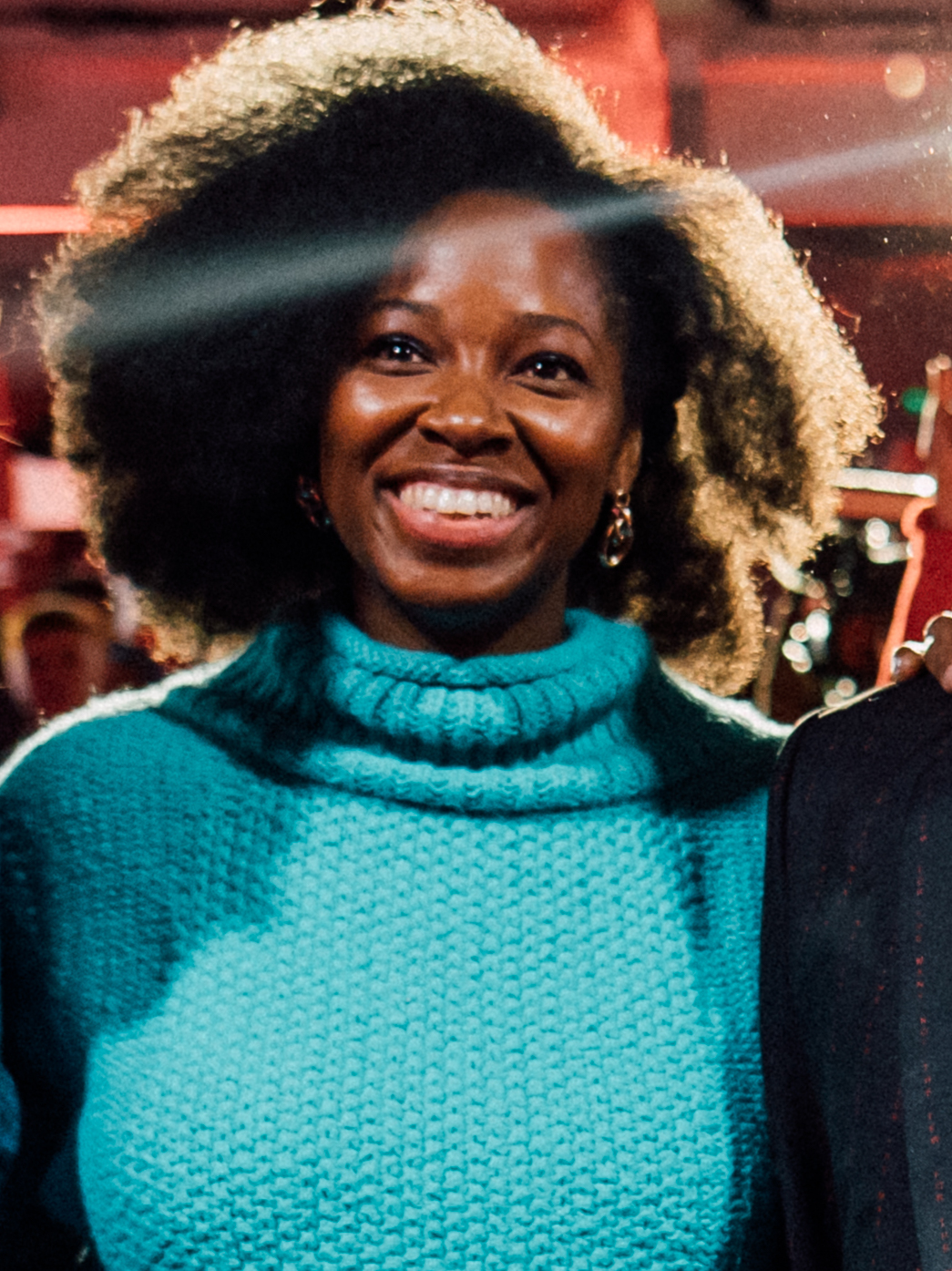
Jamelia guest starred in the episode and described the experience as "joyous".

Griffin, who portrays Ripley, said that the theme of the episode is love, and that it involves Ripley and Brooke realising that they may have a romantic connection. The couple's plot centres on Ripley continuously messing up their dates, but Brooke seeing an endearing quality in Ripley's efforts to make them work. Griffin was happy to be featured in the episode and praised director Robinson for "created an amazing environment for [them] to work in". Ali, who portrays Celeste, felt honoured to appear, describing the episode as "history". Ali said that it would have "a lot of highs, a lot of lows, and a lot of drama" but stated that ultimately, the episode is focused on bringing the Deveraux family together. She hoped that it would show a variety of Black characterisation and that they should not be typecast. Like co-star Griffin, Ali also praised Robinson for his involvement. She explained that due to his acting background, Robinson could sympathise with the cast members and give individual notes to all of them. She liked being able to get his opinion and to see his perspective, as she felt it was helpful and beneficial.

For the episode, numerous Black cast members made their first appearance and it was confirmed that they would continue to appear in Hollyoaks as series regulars. They also hinted that two Black guest stars would appear in it. These characters were later confirmed to be Nate, Olivia, Pearl, DeMarcus and returning character Prince. Thompson-Dwyer voiced his excitement to reprise his role as Prince for the episode since he felt that the episode would raise awareness that he felt is needed on television. The guest stars were later confirmed to be Jamelia and DJ Target. Jamelia appeared in the episode as Sharon Bailey, the daughter of Pearl. She described the filming process as "the most fantastic experience". Jamelia felt like she had been around family during the filming of the episode and described the process as joyous.

== Reception ==
The E4 broadcast of the episode received 450,000 viewers. Patterson (Metro) wrote that the "highly-anticipated" episode did not disappoint and that it played a "pivotal role" in Channel 4's Black to Front initiative. He felt that the episode was ground-breaking and that it provided numerous memorable moments for the viewers of Hollyoaks. He listed Martine saving Felix's life in the lake as one of the "greatest scenes" from the episode. Patterson also gave a nod to Bryan, describing her performance during the episode as incredible. Valentino Vecchietti of Diva also felt that the episode was ground-breaking and a historic moment in British television. Sarah Ellis of Inside Soap billed Hollyoaks as the soap at the forefront of "pushing soap boundaries" due to the episode.
