= Katie McGlynn =

English actress

- Born: Katie Louise McGlynn; 16 July 1993 (age 33); Rochdale, Greater Manchester, England
- Occupation: Actress
- Years active: 2010–present
- Television: Waterloo Road; Coronation Street; Hollyoaks; Strictly Come Dancing
- Partner: Ricky Rayment (2024–2025) Max Bowden (2025 - Present)

Katie Louise McGlynn (born 16 July 1993) is an English actress and DJ. She is known for her roles as Jodie "Scout" Allen in Waterloo Road (2011–2013), Sinead Tinker in Coronation Street (2013–2020), and Becky Quentin in Hollyoaks (2021–2022). In 2021, she was a contestant on the nineteenth series of Strictly Come Dancing.

== Life and career ==
Katie Louise McGlynn was born on 16 July 1993 in Rochdale, Greater Manchester to Ruth (née Carter) and Trevor McGlynn. The family lived in Littleborough, where she attended Wardle High School and studied A-levels in drama, English literature and media studies, during which time she made her acting debut as Gemma Gooch in an episode of Moving On was later cast as Jodie "Scout" Allen in the seventh series of the BBC school drama Waterloo Road. McGlynn left the show at the end of the eighth series, and subsequently joined the cast of the ITV soap opera Coronation Street as Sinead Tinker, a role she went on to play for six years until the character was killed off in a storyline that saw her die from cervical cancer in October 2019. McGlynn made her final appearance as Sinead in March 2020 when she appeared via video footage, and later that year won the award for Best Serial Drama Performance at the National Television Awards.

In 2021, McGlynn joined the cast of the Channel 4 soap opera Hollyoaks as Becky Quentin, in a storyline which saw her as a new mother who grows close to Diane Hutchinson (Alex Fletcher). She departed in February 2022. In 2021, McGlynn took part in the nineteenth series of Strictly Come Dancing. She was partnered with Gorka Márquez and the couple were second to be eliminated from the competition in week 3.

McGlynn and Ricky Rayment, from the ITVBe reality television series The Only Way Is Essex, made their relationship public knowledge via Instagram on Valentine's Day 2024. McGlynn is believed to have split from Rayment, and later began dating Eastenders and Waterloo Road star Max Bowden.

In 2026, McGlynn announced she had started a new career path as a DJ.

== Filmography ==
Year	Title	Role	Notes	Ref.
2010	Moving On	Gemma Gooch	Episode: "Skies of Glass"	
2011–2013	Waterloo Road	Jodie "Scout" Allen	Regular role	
2012	Leonardo	Lucia Rossi	Episode: "The Fugitive"	
2013–2020	Coronation Street	Sinead Tinker	Regular role	
2018	Mission Christmas	Katie	Video short	
2021	Celebrity Catchphrase	Herself	Contestant	
2021	The Syndicate	Georgina Clarke	3 episodes	
2021–2022	Hollyoaks	Becky Quentin	Regular role	
2021	Strictly Come Dancing	Contestant	Series 19	
2025	Celebrity MasterChef	Contestant	Series 20	

== Awards and nominations ==
Year	Ceremony	Award	Work	Result	Ref(s)
2013	Inside Soap Awards	Best Newcomer	Coronation Street	Longlisted	
2019	The British Soap Awards	Best Female Dramatic Performance	Coronation Street	Shortlisted	
2019	TV Choice Awards	Best Soap Actress	Coronation Street	Longlisted	
2019	Inside Soap Awards	Best Actress	Coronation Street	Longlisted	
2019	RTS North West Awards	Best Performance in a Continuing Drama	Coronation Street	Nominated	
2019	The Digital Spy Reader Awards	Best Female Soap Actor	Coronation Street	Second	
2020	25th National Television Awards	Best Serial Drama Performance	Coronation Street	Won	
