= Ricky Rayment =

English television personality (born 1990)

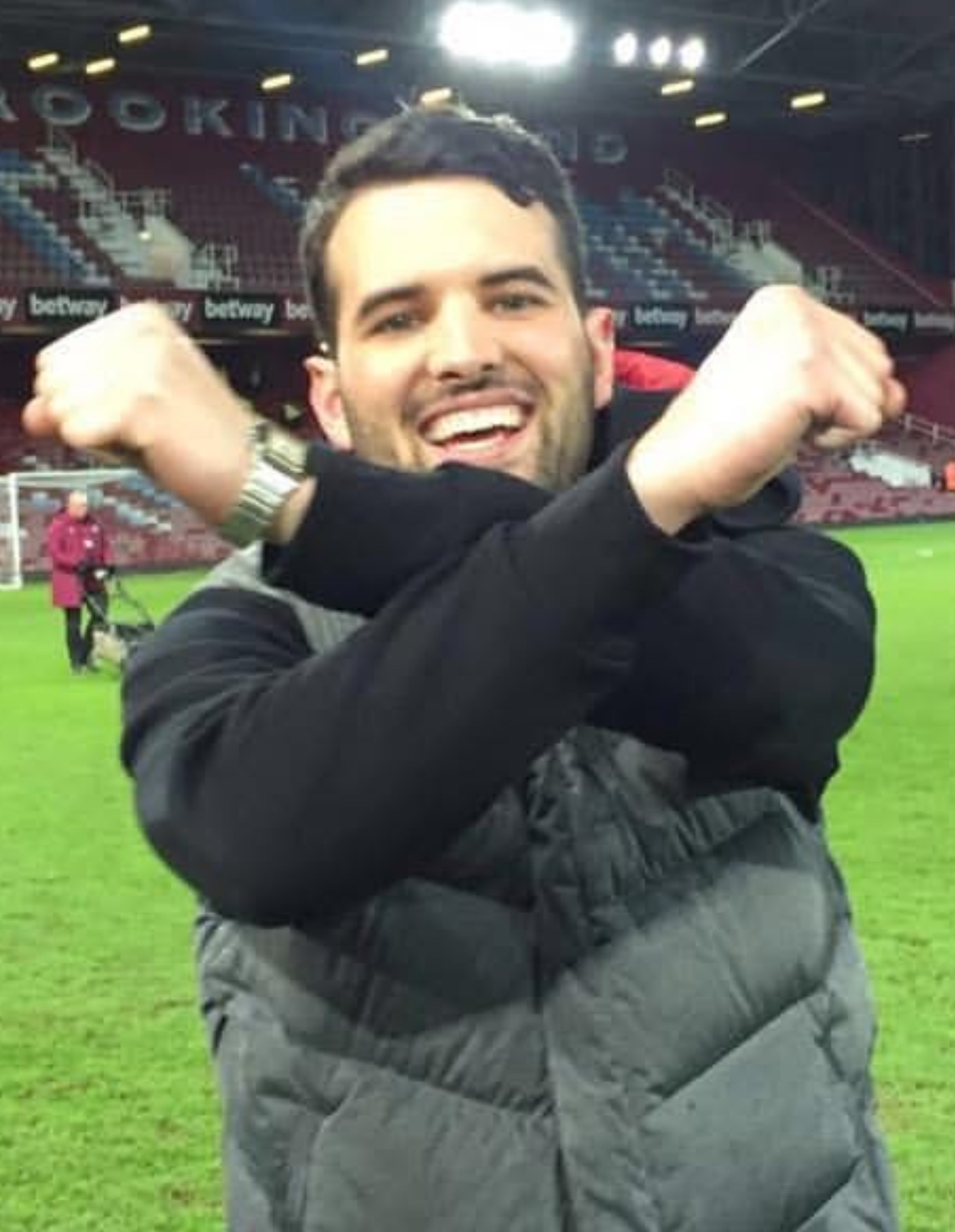
- Rayment in 2016
- Occupation(s): Television personality, singer, actor
- Years active: 2012–present
- Television: The Only Way Is Essex

Signature
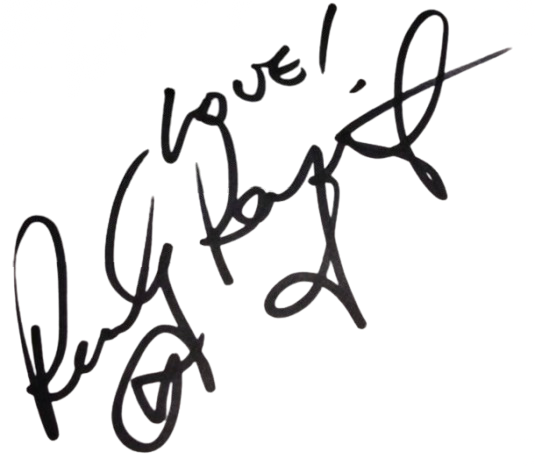

Ricky Rayment is an English television personality, singer and actor. He appeared on the ITV2 reality television series The Only Way Is Essex between January 2012 and 2015, when he left due to his relationship with Marnie Simpson. He also appeared on an episode of the Comedy Central revival of the E4 comedy game show Your Face or Mine? in 4 April 2018.

Rayment and former Coronation Street actress Katie McGlynn made their relationship public knowledge on Valentine's Day 2024.

== Filmography ==
=== As himself ===
| Year | Title | Notes |
|---|---|---|
| 2012–2015 | The Only Way Is Essex | 114 episodes |
| 2014 | This Morning | 2 episodes |
| 2014 | The Only Way Is Essex: All Back to Essex | 1 episode |
| 2016 | The Big Fish Off | 1 episode |
| 2018 | Your Face or Mine? | 1 episode |

=== As an actor ===
| Year | Title | Role |
|---|---|---|
| 2017 | Dangerous Game | Detective Lee Saunders |
| 2018 | Dead Ringer | Dominic |
