= Episode 5569 (Hollyoaks) =

2021 episode of Hollyoaks

- Hollyoaks episode
- Episode no.: Episode 5569
- Directed by: Edem Kelman
- Written by: Karla Marie Sweet
- Editing by: Tom Strachan
- Original air dates: 14 April 2021 (E4); 15 April 2021 (Channel 4)
- Running time: 30 minutes (including advertisements)

Episode chronology
← Previous "Episode 5568"	Next → "Episode 5570"

Episode 5569 of the British television soap opera Hollyoaks focuses on the unconscious bias that character Martine Deveraux (Kéllé Bryan) experiences as a Black woman in the United Kingdom. The episode was written by Karla Marie Sweet and directed by Edem Kelman, both Black creatives who felt that the episode dealt with important topical issues. This episode also acts as Kelman's professional directorial debut. The episode was first broadcast as a first-look on E4 on 14 April 2021, with its mainstream broadcast following a day later on Channel 4.

Sweet and Kelman both said that they wanted to incorporate the unconscious biases in a subtle way since they are experienced every day; they included a makeup sample in a magazine not matching Martine's skin tone, a delivery man assuming Martine is not the manager of her shop, an interviewer treating Martine and Grace Black (Tamara Wall) differently, and student nurse Peri Lomax (Ruby O'Donnell) labelling Martine aggressive when she speaks up for herself. The episode closes with a monologue led by Martine, where she states that people need to do better by unlearning their biases, with "Freedom" by Beyoncé included as a score. Bryan felt connected to the writing of the episode and has stated that it angered her to read the script due to how accurate it was. She also stated that the Black actors featured would only appear in the episode if it was realistic, since they did not want to compromise the struggles they face.

Cast member Andrea Ali was apprehensive about the response they would receive for the episode. She expected that people would think "Black people [are] upset about nothing", accrediting this to the ongoing racial injustices in the United Kingdom. However, the episode was well-received by cast members, critics, and viewers. Cast member Tamara Wall began to notice unconscious biases that companies held by not stocking plasters that are inclusive to all skin tones. Both the Daily Mirror newspaper and Closer praised the episode, as well as Black female viewers stating that their experiences were well represented by the episode.

== Plot ==
The night before her breast examination at the hospital, Martine Deveraux (Kéllé Bryan) stays up all night reading statistics about the medical mistreatment of Black women. Celeste Faroe (Andrea Ali) notices that her mother is reluctant to go to her appointment, making her promise to attend it. Martine and Grace Black (Tamara Wall) both receive a magazine subscription through the post, and when they both run out of translucent powder, they go to use the free sample given in the magazine. Grace uses it, but Martine is unable to as it does not match her skin tone. Whilst on her way to work, Martine sees Felix Westwood (Richard Blackwood) and asks if he will join her to her appointment as she is nervous. Felix tells her that she does not need his company, since she is a "strong Black queen". Alan (Stephen Thompson), a delivery man, talks to Grace whilst delivering drinks for her nightclub. Martine tries to ask where the delivery for her shop is, but he cuts her off as he assumes that she is not the manager.

Martine attends an interview for the Businesswoman of the Year award with Patsy (Cassie Vallance), who tells her that she is late and to quicken up her answers due to supposed timekeeping issues. Patsy is abrupt with Martine and tells her that she is not unique compared to other "diverse" applicants. However, when interviewing Grace, she offers her a coffee and chats nicely with her. Martine arrives for her appointment early, and when Grace arrives, the two have an argument and Grace says they should take it outside. While they argue outside, nurse Peri Lomax (Ruby O'Donnell) realises they have been double booked. Grace cries, and Peri gives her the appointment out of sympathy. Martine disagrees with her decision but is labelled as aggressive by Peri for speaking out on the injustice. Martine receives an email from Patsy with interview questions and decides to reply with how she has been treated throughout the day as a Black woman. She describes Alan, Patsy, and Peri as problematic and states that people need to do better. She then calls Felix, telling him that she wants him and she will get him.

== Production ==
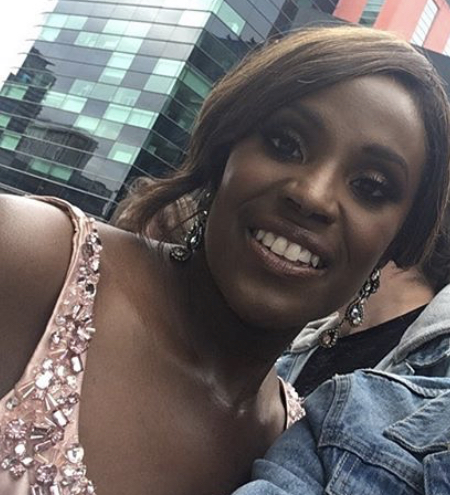
Kéllé Bryan went "off-piste" by contributing to the episode whilst reading the episode plans.

The episode focuses on a day in the life of both Grace and Martine, detailing the microaggressions that Martine faces as a Black woman in the United Kingdom. Writer Karla Marie Sweet felt that the episode was important as it helped to "send the message home" about what Black women experience daily. She wrote a line where Martine is accused of being aggressive from the tone of her voice, as she felt that one of many stereotypes that are "ingrained in our culture" is that Black women are told they are being aggressive when they speak up about injustice. Speaking to the Daily Mirror, episode lead Kéllé Bryan expressed her gratuity to Hollyoaks for dealing with the issue appropriately and accurately. She revealed that prior to the filming of the episode, all of the Black actors involved stated that they would not be involved if the episode was not accurate. They did not want to "pretty anything up" since they wanted it to feel "absolutely real". Whilst reading the episode plans, Bryan said that she connected with the writing so much that it "ignited in [her] the pain and the hatred for biases". The feelings of frustration led to her going "off-piste" and contributing to the episode herself.

Bryan, a regular panellist on the ITV talk show Loose Women, talked about the episode on the show. She was asked by panellist Jane Moore if the episode was difficult to film, which she responded by saying that it was. Bryan felt she had to "park every other area of [her] life" in order to focus on the episode, which led to people asking why she had not appeared on Loose Women for a number of weeks. She explained that the episode does not focus on people either being racist or not being racist, but the unconscious biases that lie between those mindsets. She was asked about her involvement in the episode, where she explained that executive producer Bryan Kirkwood asked for advice for the episode. The pair agreed that they did not want the episode to be subtle, and wanted to "tell the story very categorically". They felt that if they were bold with the storytelling, it would lead viewers to question their own biases and potentially "initiate social change".

Andrea Ali, who portrays Martine's daughter Celeste, felt that the episode was a raw and accurate portrayal of what she faces in real life. Ali added that the effects of the episode would make viewers question whether they hold unconscious biases. Richard Blackwood, who portrays the love interest of both Martine and Grace, echoed the comments Ali made. In the episode, Felix, his character brands Martine a "strong Black queen". Blackwood admitted that he is guilty of using this phrase as a term of endearment, since the women in his family inspire him. However, when Martine replies that she does not have to be a strong Black queen, Blackwood realised the pressure it puts on Black women to always be strong. He continued by explaining that the term places an expectancy of Black women showing no vulnerability, confirming that he would not use the phrase going forward. Bryan liked working with Blackwood in the episode since they had known each other for over twenty years. She felt that their working relationship meant that they could have a good onscreen dynamic.

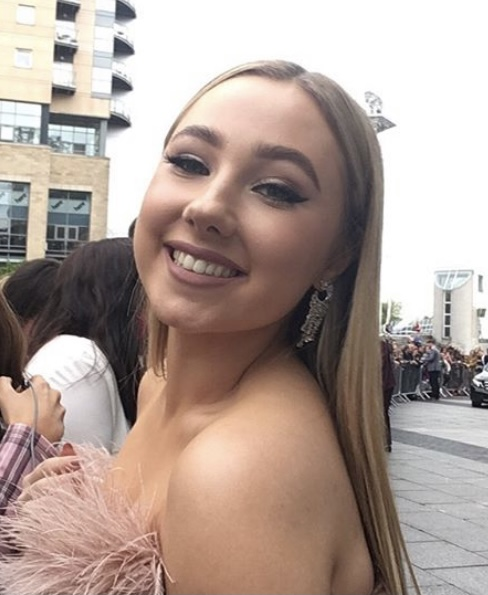
Ruby O'Donnell's character Peri Lomax was used by writer Kayla Marie Sweet to portray how medical professionals can make decisions caused by unconscious bias.

Following the transmission of the episode, the Hollyoaks YouTube channel posted a director's commentary version of the episode, a first for the soap. The video features commentary from director Edem Kelman, as well as Bryan and Sweet. Sweet revealed that initially, she wanted to write a misogynoir storyline centred around Bryan's character suffering from a heart attack, but being told she only has heartburn. However, when she read statistics online about Black women being mistreated in the medical world, it inspired the plot with Martine's breast examination. She also incorporated these statistics into the episode. Kelman stated that the episode is his professional directorial debut, expressing his gratitude to have worked on an issue-led project for his debut. In the episode, a scene where Martine and Grace both receive a magazine subscription results in Martine being unable to use the free sample since the shade is white. Kelman explained that this was done as he did not want to "pit them as rivals", but instead wanted it to be more subtle as unconscious biases are subtle and hidden in daily life. In the scene where Alan does not believe Martine is the manager, Kelman explained that this is since some white people believe that a Black woman could never be a manager. In the scenes where interviewer Patsy treats Martine and Grace differently, Bryan liked that it addressed the way people behave differently around Black and white people. Sweet noted that the character of Patsy was used to represent attitudes to Black people. She explained that Patsy is initially inconvenienced by Martine, then intimidated, and then begins to pity her. Sweet likened this to how people treat Black people in real life.

Sweet implemented a scene where student nurse Peri is busy when greeting Martine. She felt that it was important to represent how medical workers are "rushed off their feet" and have to make "snap decisions" in their line of work. Her intention for this was to highlight how some of these decisions can be influenced by unconscious biases that they hold. Whilst Peri is checking appointments on the computer, an argument between Martine and Grace can be heard in the background, which Bryan revealed was improvised. Peri confronts the two, where she reveals that there is only one appointment, and Grace begins crying. Sweet explained that she had difficulty deciding between whether Grace should cry on purpose with the intention of securing the appointment, or whether she would cry naturally "from the stress of her life". Sweet felt that she should trust the actress rather than herself, since she felt Wall knows the character better; therefore she told Wall that she could make the decision. According to Bryan, Wall "agonised" over the decision, stressing that she would be criticised for it. A scene of Martine replying to Patsy's email shows Martine crying. When filming this scene, Bryan and Kelman agreed to not cry in the take. However, Bryan cried naturally, which Kelman accredited to Bryan being so connected to the content. He decided to use the take of her crying for the episode. Sweet noted the comparison between Grace crying in public and Martine crying in private, as she felt it represented people's attitudes to women of different races being vulnerable. The episode ends with Martine telling Felix she wants him and she will get him; Sweet included this as she wanted to give Martine a "triumphant moment" in the episode.

== Reception ==
Prior to the episode airing, Ali felt that there would be a backlash. She expected that people would think "Black people [are] upset about nothing". She accredited this to the ongoing racial injustice in the United Kingdom but felt that the episode could potentially start a discussion. Whilst filming for the episode, Bryan revealed that the white actresses that appeared in the episode were concerned about receiving backlash due to viewers potentially not being able to differentiate them from their characters. Bryan also revealed that after filming, Wall went into Boots, where she noticed that they had plasters that were not inclusive to all skin tones. As a white person, Wall had never noticed this prior to the episode, and Bryan commended the episode for the effect it was already having on the cast alone.

Eva Simpson of the Daily Mirror wrote that the "powerful" plot of the episode resonated with her. Melan, a Black-written publication, praised the "powerful statement" and "ground-breaking" episode. They appreciated that unconscious biases involving race and gender had been brought to a mainspace television series such as Hollyoaks and hoped that it would lead to more discussion on the topics. The Voice gave a nod to the episode, writing that it highlighted an issue that Black people in the United Kingdom face daily. They felt unconscious bias in the healthcare industry had been "swept under the rug" for too long and appreciated that they showcased the issue. This Morning soap reporter stated that the episode featured "some of the best acting, scripting, directing [she] had seen" and said that she was still thinking of the episode days later. Viewers praised the episode; Black women wrote online that they felt represented by the plot and hoped that it would cause people to unlearn their unconscious biases.
