= Robert Beck (actor) =

English actor

- Occupation: Actor
- Years active: 1991–present
- Spouse: Jane Danson (m. 2005)
- Children: 2

Robert Beck is an English actor. He has had regular roles in several programmes such his time as Peter Harrison in Brookside (1991–1993); Dan Thatcher in The Upper Hand (1995); Gavin Ferris in Emmerdale (1999); as Bombardier Boyd Billington in Bombshell (2006) and as Terry Appleyard in Waterloo Road (2007). In 2008, he featured occasionally as criminal Jimmy Dockerson in Coronation Street. In 2021, he began appearing in the Channel 4 soap opera Hollyoaks as Fergus Collins. In 2023 he appeared as Damon Harris, AKA Harry, in ITV soap opera Emmerdale.

== Personal life ==
Beck married Coronation Street actress Jane Danson in 2005 and the couple have two sons.

== Career ==
Beck portrayed Peter Harrison in the Channel 4 soap Brookside from 1991 to 1993. He later took a step back from acting, while his children were young, he wanted to prioritise his family. After his sons became teenagers, Beck decided to focus on his acting career again. In 2021, Beck joined the cast of Hollyoaks as Fergus Collins.

== Filmography ==
Year	Title	Role	Director	Notes
1991–1993	Brookside	Peter Harrison		TV series
1992	Pressing Engagement	Nathan	Jon Weinbren	Short
1995	The Upper Hand	Dan Thatcher	Michael Owen Morris	TV series (9 episodes)
1996	Princess in Love	Adam Chatterton	David Greene	TV movie
1996	London Bridge	Dominic Roberts	David Skynner	TV series (1 episode)
1996	Cone Zone	Darth	Jo Johnson	TV series (1 episode)
1997	Thief Takers	Neil Jason	Keith Washington	TV series (1 episode)
1997	Dangerfield	Ted Vernon	Jo Johnson (2)	TV series (1 episode)
1998	The X-Files	Mate	Chris Carter	TV series (1 episode)
1998	The Bill	Simon Higgins	Tom Cotter	TV series (1 episode)
1999	The Harpist	Thug	Hansjörg Thurn	
1999	Emmerdale	Gavin Ferris	Several	TV series (29 episodes)
2002	Random Acts of Intimacy	Man in the Train	Clio Barnard	TV Short
2003	Doctors	Steve Scrivens	Darcia Martin	TV series (1 episode)
2003	The Bill	Joe Kincaid	Several	TV series (3 episodes)
2004	Murphy's Law	Guard	Ed Fraiman	TV series (1 episode)
2006	Judge John Deed	Gordon Rumsey	Adam Trotman	TV series (1 episode)
2006	Bombshell	Bombardier Boyd Billington	Jim Loach	TV series (7 episodes)
2007	Waterloo Road	Terry Appleyard	Mike Cocker	TV series (1 episode)
2008–2009	Coronation Street	Jimmy Dockerson	Several	TV series (9 episodes)
2011	Law & Order: UK	Josh Shelton	Julian Holmes	TV series (1 episode)
2012	The History of Chance	Chance	Max Blustin	Short
2012	Doctors	Sgt. Bob Chambers	Paul Gibson	TV series (1 episode)
2013	Hollyoaks	D.S. Parker	Craig Pickles	TV series (2 episodes)
2015	Sleeping Lions	Mark	David Barnes	Short
2015	Doctors	Steve Lidden	Tracey Larcombe	TV series (1 episode)
2015	Casualty	Lawrence Chester	Jo Johnson (3)	TV series (1 episode)
2016	Home Fires	Neil Lyons	Robert Quinn & John Hayes	TV series (2 episodes)
2017	The Yellow Birds	Captain Petty	Alexandre Moors	
2017	Habit	Grant	Simeon Halligan	
2021	Hollyoaks	Fergus Collins	Series regular	TV Series (72 episodes)
2023	The Bay	Len Reid		
2023–2024	Emmerdale	Damon "Harry" Harris		TV Series (22 episodes)
2024–	Waterloo Road	Jamie Haines		TV Series (2 episodes)
