= BBC Jam =

Former online educational service from 2006 to 2007

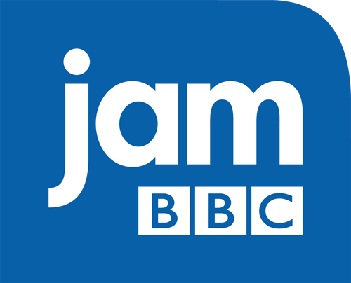
- Website type: Educational
- Available in: English, Welsh, Scottish Gaelic and Irish
- Owner: BBC
- Creator: BBC
- Website: jam.bbc.co.uk
- Commercial: No
- Registration: Optional
- Launched: January 2006; 20 years ago
- Current status: Closed as of March 20, 2007; 19 years ago

BBC Jam (formerly known as BBC Digital Curriculum) was an online educational service operated by the BBC from January 2006 to 20 March 2007. The service was available free across the United Kingdom, offering multimedia educational resources. Jam was the BBC's provision for the Digital Curriculum, an initiative launched by the British Government to provide computer-based learning in UK schools, and had a budget of £150 million. The service was shut down following a legal challenge concerning its impact on fair competition.

== Content ==
The content of the service was connected with the National Curriculum for schools in England, Wales, Scotland and Northern Ireland. It covered school subjects such as maths, science, literacy, geography, business studies and languages, and was designed to provide free, independent computer-based learning for school children.

The service was required to support users with disabilities by incorporating accessibility features such as audible text and video subtitles. There were also subjects which were translated into Welsh, Scottish Gaelic and Irish.

== History ==
=== Prior to launch ===
BBC Jam was commissioned in 2003 by the Secretary of State for Culture, Media and Sport as part of the BBC’s obligation under its Royal Charter to promote education and learning. At launch, the service was described as an innovative and distinctive online learning platform, combining curriculum-based resources with interactive media and designed to complement existing commercial e-learning products while putting learners at the centre of the experience. The service operated under conditions intended to limit its impact on the wider educational software market.

In consultation with BECTA, the Government's educational technology department, the service was allowed to cover no more than 50% of the learning outcomes that are amenable to ICT.

=== Closure ===
The service was suspended on 20 March 2007 at the request of the BBC Trust, in response to complaints made to the European Commission by a number of commercial producers of interactive educational products who felt that the BBC was exceeding its public service remit by offering free content to schools which could be provided commercially. This resulted in departmental restructuring and a number of job losses in the BBC. The Trust requested that the BBC management prepare a fresh proposal, including how the BBC should deliver its Charter obligation — promoting formal education and learning, whilst meeting the online needs of school age children.

The new proposal was subjected to a full Public Value Test by the Trust and a market impact assessment by Ofcom, the United Kingdom's telecoms regulator.

In February 2008, it was announced that the BBC's digital curriculum project would finally be closed.
