= Floral Pavilion Theatre =

Theatre in New Brighton, England

Coordinates: 53.440°N 3.038°W

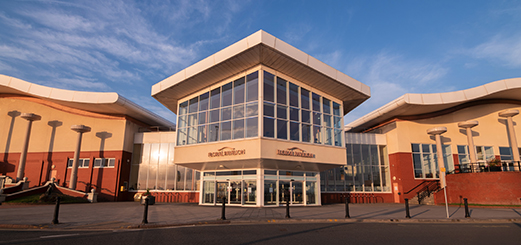
- External shot from Marine Promenade
- Interactive map of Floral Pavilion Theatre
- Address: Marine Promenade; New Brighton; England
- Capacity: 814

Construction
- Opened: 1913
- Rebuilt: 2008
- Architects: Ken Martin, Liverpool

Website
- floralpavilion.com

The Floral Pavilion Theatre is a theatre in the seaside town of New Brighton, on the Wirral Peninsula in England. Situated on the promenade overlooking the River Mersey, it presents a mix of comedy, music and children's shows including a Christmas pantomime.

The original theatre opened in 1913 as an open-air summer theatre within the Victoria Gardens. In 1925 it was covered by an iron and glass roof and during the mid-1960s it was largely rebuilt, with a full metal roof.

The theatre closed in 2007 and was demolished as part of the town's £60 million Neptune Project redevelopment plans. The building was rebuilt to a new design and reopened in December 2008. The first act to perform at the venue after reopening was Ken Dodd, who has had a long association with the Floral Pavilion, making his first appearance in 1940. As well as an enlarged theatre auditorium, seating over 800, the complex also provides for conference facilities and a large multi-purpose lounge area.
