= List of Hollyoaks characters introduced in 2021 =

Hollyoaks is a British television soap opera that was first broadcast on 23 October 1995. The following is a list of characters that first appear in the show in 2021, by order of first appearance. All characters are introduced by the show's executive producer Bryan Kirkwood, or by his successor, Lucy Allan. Brad King (Tom Benedict Knight) made his debut in January as the boyfriend of Trish Minniver (Denise Welch). Shaq Qureshi (Omar Malik), the step-cousin of Sami Maalik (Rishi Nair), made his first appearance in March, as well as Fergus Collins (Robert Beck). AJ and Curtis Pritchard also made guest appearances as Marco and Jacob, respectively. Timmy Simons (Sam Tutty) debuted in June as somebody working for Fergus. July saw the arrival of Becky Quentin (Katie McGlynn), a friend of Diane Hutchinson (Alex Fletcher). Cathy Shipton joined the cast in August as Lydia Smith, the aunt of Luke Morgan (Gary Lucy). She was followed by Ali Shahzad (Raji James), the father of Shaq. After Allan's episodes began airing, she announced her plans to introduce numerous black characters to the series. These include Nate Denby, now Saul Reeves (Chris Charles), Olivia Bradshaw (Emily Burnett), Pearl Anderson (Dawn Hope) and DeMarcus Westwood (Tomi Ade). In October, Natalie Anderson joined the soap as police detective Lexi Calder and Serena Chen-Williams joined the soap as a love interest for Sid Sumner (Billy Price). In November, Ethan Williams (Matthew James-Bailey) and his girlfriend Maya Harkwell (Ky Discala) debuted as part of a storyline where the pair kidnap Darren Osborne (Ashley Taylor Dawson). In December, Serena's family, the Chen-Williams, are introduced and became the first East Asian family in a soap opera. The family includes Honour (Vera Chok) and her husband Dave (Dominic Power), as well as their children, Sam Chen-Williams (Matthew McGivern), Lizzie Chen-Williams (Lily Best) and Mason Chen-Williams (Frank Kauer). Additionally, multiple other characters appear throughout the year.

== Brad King ==
Brad King
- Hollyoaks character
- Portrayed by: Tom Benedict Knight
- First appearance: Episode 5506; 18 January 2021
- Last appearance: Episode 5561; 5 April 2021
- Introduced by: Bryan Kirkwood
In-universe information
- Occupation: Businessman

Brad King, played by Tom Benedict Knight, made his first appearance in episode 5506, originally broadcast on 18 January 2021. The casting was announced on 5 January 2021, while Denise Welch teased the character in an interview on 11 November 2020. Brad is the boyfriend of Trish Minniver (Welch) and will accompany her into the village when she returns. Brad's appearance will come as a shock to Trish's daughter, Maxine Minniver (Nikki Sanderson). Brad has been described as both handsome and manipulative.

Speaking about his casting, Knight said: "I am really thrilled and excited to have joined the Hollyoaks family. It has been awesome on set, fast-paced, and never a dull moment working with the great cast and crew. Working with Denise and Nikki has been absolutely fantastic, both are super talented actors who are a delight to work with, and have had me in stitches non-stop! Brad is definitely here to stir things up in Hollyoaks... Get ready for a lot of bad behaviour and broken hearts. There's a new BAD boy in the village..."

== Carlton Smith ==
Carlton Smith
- Hollyoaks character
- Portrayed by: Calum Lill
- First appearance: Episode 5536; 1 March 2021
- Last appearance: Episode 5630; 9 July 2021
- Introduced by: Bryan Kirkwood
In-universe information
- Occupation: Police Constable

Police Constable Carlton Smith, portrayed by Calum Lill, was a police officer who interviews John Paul McQueen (James Sutton) after he is arrested for assaulting George Kiss (Callum Kerr). Smith later comforts George following another argument that George twists. Smith later meets with John Paul to tell him that George was killed during an altercation with four men. Sienna Blake (Anna Passey) calls PC Smith after Summer Ranger (Rhiannon Clements) steals from her apartment, but Summer replaces the stolen item before he arrives, leading him to believe that Sienna is wasting police time. After John Paul is arrested on suspicion of murdering George, Theresa McQueen (Jorgie Porter) attempts to hand him several character witness statements to prove his innocence, but PC Smith dismisses them, believing John Paul to be guilty. When he tells Theresa he would "say anything" to keep John Paul behind bars, she begins to suspect that he is the mystery witness who claimed to have see John Paul attack George. When Theresa invites him to The Dog in the Pond, he confirms her suspicions and that he was lying about what he saw. Theresa reveals she'd trapped him into confessing, with James Nightingale (Gregory Finnegan) revealing that he recorded the confession. Smith is then suspended for his actions.

He later visits the McQueens and claims that the murder weapon was found, prompting Theresa to attempt check on it. Smith follows her, and then hands the murder weapon into the police. He is later reinstated and discovers Sally St. Claire (Annie Wallace) attempting to fabricate evidence in order to free John Paul. PC Smith threatens her with arrest, although Sally later calls him over to confess to George's murder. Smith agrees to help her free John Paul and asks for a vial of her blood to plant on evidence, however, he later betrays her and has her arrested as John Paul's accomplice. After Sally is assaulted in prison, he visits her in order to taunt her. When Misbah Maalik (Harvey Virdi) finds a way to keep Sally in hospital, Smith visits the prison's doctors to find out that Sally procedures can be performed onsite and tells her that she'll be sent back to prison the following day. When he catches Sally attempting to escape, he continues to taunt her. But when John Paul tells PC Smith a DNA expert is re-examining the evidence, he panics and attempts to dispose of it. He's caught by DS Cohen, James and John Paul, and the case against Sally is dropped, while Smith is told he could face sanctions.

== Shaq Qureshi ==
Shaq Qureshi
- Hollyoaks character
- Portrayed by: Omar Malik
- Duration: 2021–2023
- First appearance: Episode 5541; 8 March 2021
- Last appearance: Episode 6032; 24 January 2023
- Introduced by: Bryan Kirkwood
In-universe information
- Father: Ali Shahzad
- Mother: Misbah Maalik
- Adoptive mother: Hasina
- Half-brothers: Imran Maalik
- Half-sisters: Farrah Maalik; Yasmine Maalik
- Aunts: Hasina; Kameela
- First cousins: Dillon Ray

Shaq Qureshi, played by Omar Malik, made his first appearance on 8 March 2021. Shaq is introduced as the step-cousin of established character Sami Maalik (Rishi Nair). Justin Harp of Digital Spy wrote that Shaq will have a "memorable entrance in the village" when he arrives in a wedding Sherwani after ditching his bride at the altar. Harp noted that the "charming and cunning" character will have make many characters in the village "swoon". He hinted that Shaq may be "key" in helping Sami to realise his girlfriend Verity Hutchinson (Eva O'Hara) is pretending to be pregnant, and noted that their reunion will be "chaotic". Malik voiced his joy to be joining Hollyoaks, and especially being part of the Maalik family unit. He stated that he is excited to be "bringing energy, charm and mischief to the Hollyoaks village". He commended his co-stars and crew members, whom he noted "went above and beyond to make me feel comfortable and relaxed", and that he loves working on Hollyoaks due to the "proper family vibe". Malik added: "I hope everyone enjoys watching Shaq, just as much as I enjoy playing him!"

Talking about his character, Malik explained that Shaq "thrives on danger" but that he is vulnerable and has "bitten off more than he can chew". He adds: "Underneath the confident and cool exterior, there's a delicate fragility that slowly glimmers the more you get to know him" and hinted that Shaq has secrets which will be explored in the future. He explained that the backstory of Shaq involves him having been in trouble and "bringing shame on his family", meaning he is considered a "liability" by his relatives. He pressures him to "make something of himself and prove everyone wrong". Malik notes that people in the village begin to realise that "there's more brewing behind Shaq's cheeky smile", and that he "catches the eye" of an unnamed McQueen woman. Malik opined that his character enjoys to socialise with women, and that although he enjoys "playing the field", he is a "gentleman at heart", and voiced his wishes for a love interest to "tame his wild and flirtatious spirit". Speaking about filming with the "mystery McQueen", Malik stated, without giving details on the actress or character, that he enjoys working with her. Due to joining Hollyoaks during the COVID-19 pandemic, Malik was unable to meet all of his co-stars in person, and had to use Zoom in order to communicate with the cast members. Despite this, he labelled it "a dream come true" to join the soap, and recalled memories from his childhood where he would watch the soap after school, adding that his younger relatives are "avid fans" of Hollyoaks. On 20 January 2023, it was confirmed that Malik was exiting the role. Shaq's final scenes aired on 24 January 2023.

After initially being introduced as the nephew of Misbah Maalik (Harvey Virdi), he later learns that he is her son and that his father is Ali Shahzad (Raji James). He forms a connection with Ali until Misbah reveals that Ali raped her. Malik felt that his character wanted a dad badly and felt that Ali wanted a relationship with his son, but only for the purpose of manipulating him. On the revelation, Malik said that Shaq is broken and feels that he no longer knows himself. He described Shaq's journey as "a rollercoaster of emotions" ranging from anger and sadness to fragility. Following a brutal attack on Ali, Malik opined that his character is capable of attacking him. Malik explained: "If he's pushed into a corner, he's willing to do anything. At one point, Shaq says to Yazz, 'If I see Ali, I'll kill him!' He's put it out there, and I think he's willing to do it. So yes, he's very capable of hurting his dad."

== Fergus Collins ==
Fergus Collins
- Hollyoaks character
- Portrayed by: Robert Beck
- First appearance: Episode 5548; 17 March 2021
- Last appearance: Episode 5727; 23 November 2021
- Introduced by: Bryan Kirkwood
In-universe information
- Occupation: Businessman

Fergus Collins, played by Robert Beck, made his first appearance on 17 March 2021. The character and casting was announced on 9 March 2021. Fergus is the ex-boyfriend of Trish Minniver (Denise Welch) and a former business partner of Trish's current boyfriend Brad King (Benedict Knight). Fergus arrives in the village with a new business proposition for Brad, however, his old feelings for Trish resurface.

Beck voiced his joy at appearing on a soap again, having previously appeared in Brookside, which was filmed in the same studio as Hollyoaks. Speaking about joining Hollyoaks, Beck said: "I'm over the moon to be given this opportunity. I couldn't really feel more at home, especially having started my career here with Brookside. Everyone has been so welcoming, including many old faces who were around in my Brookie days. Working with Denise and Nikki [Sanderson, aka Maxine] is great – I know them both and they've really helped me settle in." Teasing his character a bit, the actor said: "Fergus is a lovely character to play... He's cheeky, but he's a man you really wouldn't want as an enemy, and to be honest, you would probably have to be pretty careful if he was your friend..."

After promotional photos of Fergus were released, viewers speculated that he would be a villain based on his appearance. Beck confirmed viewers' comments, commenting that Fergus is "a bit dodgy", and "a shady businessman who likes to meddle, and delights in others' discomfort." He went on state: "Fergus is the type of person who'll walk into a room, drop a bombshell, and take great pleasure in watching people react!" Following the release of Hollyoaks' spring trailer, a scene depicted Fergus spying on young couple Juliet Nightingale (Niamh Blackshaw) and Peri Lomax (Ruby O'Donnell) with a camera planted in their bedroom. Digital Spy confirmed that he is a villain and wrote that Juliet and Peri may be in danger.

Scenes later explore Fergus' side business, an operation he names Bluebird. The operation involves the installation of cameras disguised as alarms in women's bedrooms in order to film them for Fergus' live-streaming website. People pay to watch the women being filmed without their permission. He employs Timmy Simons (Sam Tutty) to help him with the technological aspect of the business. Timmy forms an obsession with Peri and later informs her and Juliet of the cameras in their bedroom; in order to keep the truth emerging about Bluebird, Fergus shoots him dead and has Warren Fox (Jamie Lomas) bury his body with him. Fergus closes down the live-streaming website to avoid further trouble and as a result of the feed going down, a subscriber messages him and offers to pay him £1 million to buy Maxine, who he had watched on Fergus' website. He agrees to the offer and arranges for Maxine to be trafficked; when the trafficking is discovered by the police, he lies to the police by framing Warren. Maxine and Trish later realise the truth and Trish confronts him on his crimes whilst wearing a police informant wire. He realises that he is being recorded and goes to kill Trish, until Maxine strikes him over the head with a champagne bottle, leaving him dead.

== Marco ==
Marco
- Hollyoaks character
- Portrayed by: AJ Pritchard
- First appearance: Episode 5556; 29 March 2021
- Last appearance: Episode 5590; 14 May 2021
- Introduced by: Bryan Kirkwood
In-universe information
- Occupation: Dance Teacher
- Brothers: Jacob

Marco, played by AJ Pritchard made his first appearance on 29 March 2021. The casting was announced on 7 February 2021, while the character's name was announced on 23 March 2021. Marco and his twin brother Jacob, played by AJ's real-life brother Curtis, will be rivals to dance teacher Trish Minniver (Denise Welch). Speaking about their characters and casting, Pritchard said: "I can't believe we will be featuring on Hollyoaks, we have grown up with the show on TV and it's always been one of our favourite serial dramas. Our characters are fantastic, and we can't wait for everyone to see how we bring them to life." Pritchard described Marco as cheeky and confident, and claimed that Marco "knows what he wants". He added that upon his character's arrival, he "acts as if he owns the place".

Following his debut scenes airing, Pritchard's acting capabilities received criticism from viewers. Hayley Parker of The Sentinel wrote that fans of the soap did not give him "the best reception", with his performance being described as "robotic and wooden". Viewers claimed that their own acting skills were better than Pritchard's, describing him as "cringe," and that his episode was one of the worst Hollyoaks episodes to be aired, demanding for the dance school storyline to be scrapped. Following social media users posting clips of the Pritchard brothers' scenes, they went viral and were the subject of widespread jokes, criticism and negativity. Former Hollyoaks cast member Gerard McCarthy commented on the scenes, stating that casting directors should not cast people purely for having a large social media following. Speaking to OK! about the viral criticism himself and his brother were facing, Pritchard stated: "If someone's got constructive criticism, 100 per cent that's great, but if it's just negativity then it's not something I'm going to waste my energy and time on that. It was really good to learn off all the professionals. I loved it, it was great."

== Jacob ==
Jacob
- Hollyoaks character
- Portrayed by: Curtis Pritchard
- First appearance: Episode 5585; 7 May 2021
- Last appearance: Episode 5590; 14 May 2021
- Introduced by: Bryan Kirkwood
In-universe information
- Brothers: Marco

Jacob, played by Curtis Pritchard, made his first appearance on 7 May 2021. The casting was announced on 7 February 2021, while the character's name was announced on 27 April 2021. Jacob and his twin brother, Marco, who will be played by Curtis' real-life brother, AJ, will be rivals to dance teacher Trish Minniver (Denise Welch). Speaking about their characters casting, Pritchard said: "I am so excited to be working with my brother AJ on a show we grew up watching! I am also excited to continue our journey together with Channel 4 and E4."

Following social media users posting clips of the Pritchard brothers' scenes, they went viral and were the subject of widespread jokes, criticism and negativity. Former Hollyaks cast member Gerard McCarthy commented on the scenes, stating that casting directors should not cast people purely for having a large social media following. Speaking to OK! about the viral criticism himself and his brother were facing, Pritchard stated: "Up to this moment I felt absolutely nothing about it because I hadn't realised anybody had said anything. We always get that, we always get different things and for me it's always about positivity."

== Sinbad ==
Thomas "Sinbad" Sweeney, portrayed by Michael Starke, is a character in Channel 4 soap opera Brookside who appeared between 1984 and 1985, and then again between 1987 and 2000. He was pictured on set with other previously announced returning former Brookside co-stars: Sue Johnston as Sheila Grant, John McArdle as Billy Corkhill, Paul Usher as Barry Grant, Philip Olivier as Tinhead, Suzanne Collins as Nikki Shadwick, and Ricky Tomlinson as Bobby Grant. Sinbad first appeared in Hollyoaks on 3 June 2021 as a taxi driver using the name Benny and made sporadic appearances throughout that year and again between 2023 and 2024. His character was described to be "cheekie cabbie" and "mysterious" by Justin Harp from Digital Spy.

In 2024, his former Brookside co-star, Louis Emerick was cast as police officer Donny Clark, who was revealed to actually be his Brookside character, Mick Johnson in the crossover episode on 22 October 2025. Both actors celebrated their soap reunion with a "heart-warming" picture from the set, captioning the shot of the two of them hugging: "Two new juvenile leads at Hollyoaks." Stefania Sarrubba from Digital Spy described the reunion to be "Mick and Sinbad are back together." This foreshadowed the events of the crossover episode as Benny was revealed to be Sinbad all along.

== Timmy Simons ==
Timmy Simons
- Hollyoaks character
- Portrayed by: Sam Tutty
- First appearance: Episode 5604; 3 June 2021
- Last appearance: Episode 5698; 13 October 2021
- Introduced by: Bryan Kirkwood

Timmy Simons, played by Sam Tutty, made his first appearance on 3 June 2021. Timmy is introduced as a "computer wizard" hired by Fergus Collins (Robert Beck) to look after the technical side of his secret operation that films teenage girls in their bedrooms. Justin Harp of Digital Spy wrote that on the surface, Timmy seems like a regular character, but that in time, viewers will see he is "not someone to be easily underestimated". On his casting, Tutty said: "working at Hollyoaks is an absolute delight. Everyone has been so welcoming and have been very supportive whenever I have had any questions." He gave an ode to Beck, whose character is Timmy's "terrifying overseer". Tutty stated that he felt privileged to play a character like Timmy due to his "poisoned moral compass [which] has led him down a treacherous path".

Timmy forms an obsession with Peri Lomax (Ruby O'Donnell) and he becomes determined to anonymously ruin her relationship with her girlfriend Juliet Nightingale (Niamh Blackshaw), as he feels that Juliet does not deserve her. Juliet discovers what he has been doing to ruin her relationship and tries to tell Peri, but Timmy manipulates Peri into thinking she is deluded. He then pushes Juliet down a flight of steps and holds Peri hostage in her home. She realises that he has been stalking her for months and watching her from the camera installed in her bedroom. They get a confession on tape and plan to go the police; however, when Fergus discovers that Timmy could get him into trouble, he shoots and kills him. Tutty was sad to leave the show as he enjoyed the working environment and he felt that there was a lot more to be discovered about Timmy, but he could not stay on the soap for a longer tenure due to appearing in Dear Evan Hansen. He also knew that Timmy would only feature on the soap for a number of months due to his forthcoming theatre appearance. When asked if he would have liked Timmy to be redeemed, he replied: "I would have loved to have played Timmy for another year or so. I think turning over a new leaf was something he was capable of. But it's whether Fergus would have allowed him to do that." Tutty revealed that Timmy's death was filmed in various different ways and that prior to the scenes airing, he was not aware of which ending they would air. Tutty felt that Fergus was the right option to take Timmy out due to knowing him the most out of the villagers. Tutty admitted that he was apprehensive about playing a villain, especially since he had not acted on television before. He accredited the crew of Hollyoaks for guiding his choices and felt that they were accommodating to his unsureness. He also accredited Blackshaw and O'Donnell, who he formed friendships with whilst appearing on the soap. Tutty was glad to see Juliet and Peri get their revenge on Timmy in his final episode and described the scenes as fun; he admitted that fans of their relationship did not receive Timmy well, adding: "As soon as you compromise 'Jeri' and their ship, you are immediately on the chopping block – which I totally accepted and was hoping for, really. I didn't want Timmy to be well-received, because that wouldn't really bode well for Peri and Juliet!"

== Becky Quentin ==
Becky Quentin
- Hollyoaks character
- Portrayed by: Katie McGlynn
- Duration: 2021-2022
- First appearance: Episode 5627; 6 June 2021
- Last appearance: Episode 5788; 16 February 2022
- Introduced by: Bryan Kirkwood
In-universe information
- Husband: Graham
- Sons: Harry Quentin

Becky Quentin, played by Katie McGlynn, made her first appearance on 6 July 2021. Becky is a new mother who grows close to Diane Hutchinson (Alex Fletcher) as they swap stories about motherhood, however Digital Spy's Emily Hutchinson teased that Becky could have ulterior motives. Becky departed on 16 February 2022.

Speaking about her character, McGlynn said: "When I first read the script, I knew instantly that this storyline was an important one, and something that I could really sink my teeth into. I'm so excited for everyone to meet Becky and am thrilled to be working alongside the amazing cast and crew of Hollyoaks." She added she was "hopeful the story will have an impact on the viewers as it covers some extremely current and important issues," and that she was "super humbled" to continue working.

== Eva Hutchinson ==
Eva Hutchinson
- Hollyoaks character
- Portrayed by: Uncredited (2021); Rosie (2022–2023); Aubrey Burgess (2025–present)
- Duration: 2021–2023, 2025–present
- First appearance: Episode 5617; 22 June 2021
- Created by: Bryan Kirkwood
In-universe information
- Father: Edward Hutchinson
- Mother: Diane Hutchinson
- Adoptive father: Tony Hutchinson
- Half-brothers: Tony Hutchinson; Eric Foster; Anthony Hutchinson; Ro Hutchinson; Dominic Reilly; Beau Ramsey (adoptive); Harry Thompson (adoptive); Finn O'Connor (adoptive)
- Half-sisters: Verity Hutchinson; Grace Hutchinson (adoptive); Dee Dee Hutchinson (adoptive); Sinead O'Connor (adoptive); Morgan Osborne (adoptive)
- Grandfathers: Edward Hutchinson (adoptive)
- Grandmothers: Victoria Hutchinson (adoptive)
- Uncles: Eric Foster (adoptive); Dom Reilly (adoptive)
- Aunts: Verity Hutchinson (adoptive); Babs Drinkwell; Lynette Drinkwell
- Nephews: Beau Ramsey; Harry Thompson; Anthony Hutchinson; Ro Hutchinson; Isaac Thompson
- Nieces: Grace Hutchinson; Dee Dee Hutchinson; Morgan Osborne
- First cousins: Scott Drinkwell (adoptive); Lily Drinkwell
- Other relatives: Dom Reilly; Isaac Thompson

Eva Hutchinson is the daughter of Diane Hutchinson (Alex Fletcher), the biological daughter of Edward Hutchinson (Joe McGann), the adoptive daughter of Tony Hutchinson (Nick Pickard), the half-sister of Tony, Verity (Eva O'Hara) and Anthony Hutchinson (William Thompson), Eric Foster (Angus Castle-Doughty), and Ro Hutchinson (Ava Webster), and the adoptive half-sister of Dominic Reilly (John Pickard), Harry Thompson (Parry Glasspool) and Dee Dee Hutchinson (Lacey Findlow).

Whilst Tony was being held hostage at Stone Mount Farm by Breda McQueen (Moya Brady), Tony's wife Diane (who believed that he had left her for another woman) began a relationship with Tony's father, Edward. When Tony was released, Edward continued to drive a wedge between the pair. In December 2020, Diane discovered what Edward was doing and he beat her with a suitcase, leaving her comatose where he secretly impregnated her. Edward later died at Christmas after accidentally eating a mince pie he had poisoned.

Edward's will listed an extra dependant, which confused the Hutchinson family. Diane discovered that she was pregnant in January 2021 and despite hoping the baby was Tony's, the age of her unborn baby confirmed that Edward was the father. Diane decided against having a termination, and she and Tony decided that Tony would father the baby.

Diane began struggling with OCD throughout her pregnancy, exacerbated by the ongoing pandemic, fearing that germs from outside of the flat could harm the baby. 21 days before her due date, Diane went into labour alone at home, adamant on having a home birth and refusing to let anyone into the flat. Tony managed to convince her to give birth at hospital, which Diane agreed, although she discharged herself and the baby as soon as possible.

Diane ended up meeting Becky Quentin (Katie McGlynn), who gave birth to a son in the room next door. A conspiracy theorist, Becky caused Diane to develop concerns over vaccinating Eva, but Tony was adamant on getting her vaccinated. Becky and Diane's friendship ended not long after the Hutchinsons moved from 3 Oakdale Drive, Flat 4 to 1 Stockton Lane.

== Lydia Smith ==
Lydia Smith, played by Cathy Shipton, made her first appearance on 30 August 2021. Her casting and character details were announced on 20 August 2021. Lydia is the aunt of Luke Morgan (Gary Lucy) and Zara Morgan (Kelly Greenwood) and arrives in the village following the death of their mother Sue Morgan (Marian McLoughlin). Lydia will arrive in the village after her husband, and Luke and Zara's uncle, dies from FTD Pick's disease, the same condition Luke is suffering from, and will give Cindy Cunningham (Stephanie Waring) advice about living with someone with the condition.

== Ali Shahzad ==
Ali Shahzad
- Hollyoaks character
- Portrayed by: Raji James
- Duration: 2021–2022
- First appearance: Episode 5670; 3 September 2021
- Last appearance: Episode 5888; 6 July 2022
- Introduced by: Bryan Kirkwood
In-universe information
- Sons: Shaq Qureshi

Ali Shahzad, played by Raji James, made his first appearance on 3 September 2021. The character and casting was announced on 23 August 2021. Ali is the father of Shaq Qureshi (Omar Malik) and becomes a new hire at the Dee Valley Hospital. The character was described as someone who is able to win others over with his charm and professionalism, but someone who is hiding dark secrets.

Speaking about his casting, James said: "I'm delighted to be joining the cast of Hollyoaks, particularly as I'm part of a very topical and potentially explosive storyline. Ali is a very complex character and I'm thoroughly enjoying the opportunity to explore his darker side. Due to the COVID rules in place, I've only been able to meet a few of the other cast members so far, they, along with the incredible crew and office staff, have all been very welcoming and supportive, making it easy to fit in. Having hit the ground running, we've already filmed a few hugely emotional scenes. It's been an absolute pleasure to work alongside and learn from such fantastic actors as Harvey Virdi (Misbah), Omar Malik (Shaq), Sarah Jayne Dunn (Mandy), Lysette Anthony (Marnie) and Nadine Mulkerrin (Cleo)."

== Saul Reeves ==
Saul Reeves
- Hollyoaks character
- Portrayed by: Chris Charles
- Duration: 2021–2022
- First appearance: Episode 5672; 7 September 2021
- Last appearance: Episode 5900; 6 July 2022
- Introduced by: Bryan Kirkwood
In-universe information
- Other names: Nate Denby
- Occupation: Police Constable

Saul Reeves (also Nate Denby), played by Chris Charles, made his first appearance on 7 September 2021. Saul is a new stallholder at the Cunningham's Grand Bazaar and becomes a roommate to Grace Black (Tamara Wall) and Ripley Lennox (Ki Griffin). Although Saul quickly bonds with the pair, the situation become complicated when he develops feelings for Grace. It has been teased though that Saul may not be someone who can be trusted.

Speaking of his casting, Charles said: "I'm absolutely thrilled and honoured to be joining such a legendary show and staple in British television. Words can't describe how blessed I feel or the level of excitement I have to get started and bring Nate to the village for all of our amazing audience. Let the drama begin!"

It is later revealed that Saul is an undercover police officer who has been going under the name, Nate Denby, hired to bring down Fergus Collins' (Robert Beck) illegal operation known as Bluebird, but that he has gone rogue on his own private mission to track down Lisa Loveday (Rachel Adedeji), who unbeknownst to him was murdered by Toby Faroe (Bobby Gordon). In an interview with Inside Soap, Charles said that the viewer reaction to his character has been mixed, with many suspicious of him at the beginning of his tenure. However, following the reveal that he is an undercover police officer, he said that the feedback had been positive. The actor was asked if Saul's feelings for Grace were real or faked for the mission, to which he confirmed that Saul does have true feelings for Grace despite their relationship initially being formed as part of his plan. He was also asked what Saul's reaction to discovering the truth about Lisa's murder would be. Charles affirmed that Saul would not result to violence and would rather keep it "in the parameters of the law", despite Saul and the Deveraux family being on "a collision course".

== Olivia Bradshaw ==
Olivia Bradshaw
- Hollyoaks character
- Portrayed by: Emily Burnett
- Duration: 2021–2022
- First appearance: Episode 5674; 9 September 2021
- Last appearance: Episode 6015; 29 December 2022
- Introduced by: Lucy Allan
In-universe information
- Other names: Olivia McQueen
- Occupation: Heiress; Teacher
- Husband: Prince McQueen (2022–2023 (Note: The divorce between Prince and Olivia took place after her initial departure.))

Olivia Bradshaw-McQueen (also Bradshaw), played by Emily Burnett, made her first appearance on 9 September 2021. Her casting and character details were announced on 6 July 2021, where it was confirmed that she would be introduced as part of Prince McQueen's (Malique Thompson-Dwyer) return storyline. Olivia becomes a staff member at Hollyoaks High. Upon the announcement of her casting, Burnett stated that she is having a lot of fun working with Thompson-Dwyer and Chelsee Healey, who portrays Prince's mother Goldie McQueen. Burnett also hoped her character would be considered a part of the McQueen family one day. Burnett described Olivia as "classy, very sassy" and someone that knows what she wants. Burnett also said that her character is "probably someone you don't want to get on the wrong side of" but noted that she has a good heart, especially concerning Prince. Hollyoaks confirmed that Olivia will cause a stir with the McQueen family due to her "self-assuredness and fondness for the finer things in life". It was confirmed on 19 December 2022 that Burnett would be departing from Hollyoaks. Olivia's final scenes aired on 29 December 2022.

Following Olivia's debut, Alice Penwill from Inside Soap wrote that she loves Olivia and hoped that Goldie would not "ruin things" between her and Olivia.

== Pearl Anderson ==
Pearl Anderson, played by Dawn Hope, made her first appearance on 10 September 2021. Her casting was announced on 17 August 2021 and it was confirmed that she would be introduced as a figure from Walter Deveraux's (Trevor A. Toussaint) past. Pearl is a friend of his dead wife Gloria and the Deveraux family in general. Pearl's intention for coming to the village is to catch up with the Deveraux family and to reminisce about her memories with Gloria. Hope said that she was thrilled to be joining the cast of Hollyoaks and voiced her excitement to be playing Pearl, who she described as fun-loving, vibrant and stylish. Writing for the Metro, Stephen Patterson described Pearl as a gregarious and forthright character who "brings a welcomed warmth to those around her". Patterson also noted that Pearl is an adventurous woman who refuses to slow down her life.

== Sharon Bailey ==
Sharon Bailey, portrayed by Jamelia, is the daughter of Pearl Anderson (Dawn Hope), mother of Zoe Anderson (Garcia Brown) and the childhood friend of Martine Deveraux (Kéllé Bryan). She made her debut in episode 5675, originally broadcast on 10 September 2021. This was Jameila's second role in the show since 2003. In March 2023, it was announced that Jamelia had reprised the role, and she returned on 21 March 2023. It was announced on 27 March 2024 that the Jamelia had left the role. She departed in episode 6360, originally broadcast on 24 April 2024.

== DeMarcus Westwood ==
DeMarcus Westwood
- Hollyoaks character
- Portrayed by: Tomi Ade
- Duration: 2021–2023
- First appearance: Episode 5675; 10 September 2021
- Last appearance: Episode 6153; 12 July 2023
- Introduced by: Lucy Allan
In-universe information
- Father: Felix Westwood
- Mother: Viv
- Stepmother: Martine Deveraux
- Half-brothers: Toby Faroe; Mitchell Deveraux
- Half-sisters: Celeste Faroe

DeMarcus Westwood, played by Tomi Ade, made his first appearance on 10 September 2021. The character and casting was announced on 23 August 2021. DeMarcus is the son of Felix Westwood (Richard Blackwood) who arrives in the village to reconnect with his estranged father. The character has been described as headstrong and rebellious and it was noted that he could cause trouble for other teen characters in the village. It has also been teased that DeMarcus may struggle to connect with half-siblings Toby Faroe (Bobby Gordon) and Celeste Faroe (Andrea Ali).

DeMarcus tracks Felix to the village through an app he had installed on his phone, confronting him at Walter Deveraux’s (Trevor A. Toussaint) birthday party. Initially sour, DeMarcus is left feeling guilty after Felix nearly drowns when DeMarcus crashes into his canoe. DeMarcus decides to move in with Felix and his partner, Martine Deveraux (Kéllé Bryan), which DeMarcus' mother Viv (Velile Tshabalala) agrees to.

Speaking about joining the soap, Ade said: "Joining the cast of Hollyoaks has been such an amazing experience. The cast have been so welcoming, and I've just had a blast on set so far. I cannot wait for the fans to meet DeMarcus and see what we have in store for him and his journey in the village!"

On 8 June 2023, it was announced Ade had quit the role after two years on the show, with DeMarcus set to depart upon moving to the United States for a fresh start. His final scenes aired on 12 July 2023.

== Serena Chen-Williams ==
Serena Chen-Williams, played by Emma Lau, made her first appearance on 23 September 2021. She was introduced to the series as a woman under the alias of Galaxy who meets Sid Sumner (Billy Price) on a night out and ends up in possession of his prosthetic leg. She arranges to meet him the following day, where Sid finds himself attracted to her. The pair kiss before she leaves. Lau was initially contracted on Hollyoaks as a guest star, but in November 2021, it was confirmed that she had been contracted as a series regular. Then in December 2021, she was revealed to be a member of the Chen-Williams, a new family on Hollyoaks and the first East Asian family on a soap opera. Upon her casting announcement, Serena was described as an aspiring olympian who has always been driven and ambitious to succeed in her athletic ventures, but she is now wanting to rebel due to being "torn between living a normal teenage life and focusing on athleticism". Lau knew that she was auditioning for the role of Serena, an athlete, and was surprised to find out that her first scenes as Galaxy involved her stating that she is a singer. However, the producers eventually told her that this was an alter ego that Serena uses to feel confident.

== Lexi Calder ==
Lexi Calder
- Hollyoaks character
- Portrayed by: Natalie Anderson
- Duration: 2021–2022
- First appearance: Episode 5710; 29 October 2021
- Last appearance: Episode 5949; 29 September 2022
- Introduced by: Bryan Kirkwood
In-universe information
- Occupation: Detective Inspector
- Husband: Carter Shepherd
- Daughters: Freya Calder

D.S. Lexi Calder, played by Natalie Anderson, made her first appearance on 29 October 2021. The character and casting was announced on 19 October 2021. Upon her casting, it was revealed that she would be appearing alongside characters including Grace Black (Tamara Wall), Felix Westwood (Richard Blackwood), Martine Deveraux (Kéllé Bryan) and fellow newcomer Nate Denby (Chris Charles). It was also teased that Lexi's arrival in the village would cause secrets to be unearthed about the Deveraux family.

Speaking about her time on the soap, Anderson said: "I'm having so much fun, and everyone at Hollyoaks have been so lovely and welcoming." Upon her arrival, it is revealed that Lexi is a police detective who works with Nate. On 29 September 2022, she was killed by Silas Blissett (Jeff Rawle), making her his last victim before his own death.

== Ethan Williams ==
Ethan Williams
- Hollyoaks character
- Portrayed by: Matthew James-Bailey
- Duration: 2021–2024
- First appearance: Episode 5717; 9 November 2021
- Last appearance: Episode 6471; 8 October 2024
- Introduced by: Lucy Allan
In-universe information
- Half-brothers: Dave Chen-Williams
- Wife: Sienna Blake (2024)
- Stepsons: Sebastian Blake (2024)
- Stepdaughters: Sophie Blake (2024)
- Nephews: Sam Chen-Williams; Mason Chen-Williams
- Nieces: Maxine Minniver; Lizzie Chen Williams (adoptive); Serena Chen-Williams (adoptive)
- Other relatives: Minnie Minniver

Ethan Williams, played by Matthew James-Bailey, made his first appearance on 9 November 2021. The character and casting was introduced during the episode as Ethan was revealed to have kidnapped Darren Osborne (Ashley Taylor Dawson). Ethan's role was later expanded as he was revealed to have been working with girlfriend Maya Harkwell (Ky Discala). Speaking about his character, James-Bailey said playing him was "incredibly fun" and teased: "I won't give too much away, but Ethan is here to shake things up and bring a new, albeit 'manic', energy to the village – unfortunately so for Darren. And he won't be the last to have the displeasure of meeting Ethan... Ethan's definitely coming in with a bang." He also recalled being in an episode of Hollyoaks earlier in his career and how he came out of the episode thinking about how he would like to be on the soap long-term, which made his casting a personal success for him. An official Hollyoaks video highlighting the Chen-Williams family called Ethan "The Ex-gangster, babysitter uncle".

In an interview with Inside Soap's Alice Penwill, James-Bailey said that playing Ethan is his first experience with playing a villain and that he loves it. He explained that the difference, however, between Ethan being a regular villain is that he is "three-dimensional", and that while he may come across as a "typical bad boy [...] he has a heart". After the death of Maya, Ethan is left with her body to hide. He stores her body in a van belonging to Sienna Blake (Anna Passey) and Ste Hay (Kieron Richardson) and threatens them into burying the body for their van back. However, Ethan learns that Sienna cannot be intimidated by him. On the pair's interactions, James-Bailey told Penwill that there is chemistry between them. He noted that since Ethan had a relationship with Maya, he is shown to have an obvious "thing for very powerful and strong women". Despite Sienna not being intimidated by Ethan, Ste is, which James-Bailey admitted left him feeling nervous from the fan reaction. He explained: "no one's going to be keen on Ethan after this. He becomes quite manipulative with Ste, which for an outsider is sad to see". The actor opined that Ethan's yearn for power comes from being controlled by Maya in their relationship.

On Ethan being the brother of Dave Chen-Williams (Dominic Power), James-Bailey said that Dave cares strongly for Ethan due to having raised him in a brotherly way. He noted that their bond would be hard to break but that it could be threatened by the presence of Dave's wife, Honour (Vera Chok), who does not like Ethan. Power gave James-Bailey advice for how to portray Ethan and noted the similarities between Ethan and his former Emmerdale character, villain Cameron Murray. On his general experience on the soap, James-Bailey stated that he is enjoying the "roller coaster" atmosphere on set and noted that with his initial dark storylines, he was "thrown in at the deep end", which he loved. On the eventuality of appearing alongside other villain Warren Fox (Jamie Lomas), he explained that their scenes are interesting and that it would be exciting to see the characters "go head-to-head" due to Ethan being a modern-day criminal as opposed to Warren, who he felt is "old school" and would "lead with his fists".

== Maya Harkwell ==
Maya Harkwell, played by Ky Discala, made her first appearance on 1 December 2021. The character and casting was announced in the programme's 2021 winter trailer. Maya is the girlfriend of Ethan Williams (Matthew James-Bailey) and is behind the kidnap of Darren Osborne (Ashley Taylor Dawson). Maya is billed as the soap's "new female villain" and as a "femme fatale" with Discala describing her character as "ruthless". During a scuffle with Ethan, Maya is accidentally shot and killed, dying in his arms.

== Dave Chen-Williams ==
Dave Williams (also Chen-Williams), played by Dominic Power, made his first appearance on 1 December 2021. The character and casting was announced on 23 November 2021. Dave initially appears as outwardly friendly and kind, but it has been teased that he is hiding some dark secrets that could spell trouble for some of the residents. Dave's initial storyline sees him clashing with Theresa McQueen (Jorgie Porter) over a doll's house they are both after. Speaking about joining the soap, Power said: "It's an honour to be part of such an iconic British soap. Can't wait for the Hollyoaks fans to meet Dave."

An official Hollyoaks video highlighting the Chen-Williams family named Honour and Dave as "The fun loving parents". Dave is later revealed to be a member of the Chen-Williams, a new family on Hollyoaks and the first East Asian family on a soap opera. After his arrival and the introduction, it is revealed that before his marriage to Honour (Vera Chok), Dave was married to another woman. He had married this woman after he abandoned his ex-girlfriend, Trish Minniver (Denise Welch) and it emerges that he is the father of established character Maxine Minniver (Nikki Sanderson). Dave was killed off on the episode broadcast on 11 September 2024.

== Honour Chen-Williams ==
Honour Chen-Williams was played by Vera Chok from 2021 to 2023. The character and casting was announced in November 2021 and Honour made her first appearance on 10 December 2021. Honour was introduced as Warren Fox (Jamie Lomas)'s prison psychologist and later revealed to be part of a new Hollyoaks family, which included Honour's husband and their children. An official Hollyoaks video highlighting the Chen-Williams family named Honour and Dave as "The fun loving parents". Chok was very grateful to be given the role, feeling that she had hit the Bamboo ceiling, and felt proud in being part of the first East Asian family in a soap opera. Chok was able to help impact the development of the character a little bit and was also able to influence the set of Honour's home by adding a rice cooker and making it a no-shoe house.

Honour's initial storylines included her work with Warren and her relationship with Dave and their family, as well as trying to fit in into the community. Another early storyline sees Honour and her family celebrate Lunar New Year, with Hollyoaks being the first soap opera to celebrate it. The character was given a short issue-based storyline when Honour and her daughter, Serena Chen-Williams (Emma Lau), experience Sinophobia, which Chok and other cast members praised for highlighting Xenophobia and racism related to the COVID-19 pandemic. Honour later gives the other residents free therapy sessions, with Chok also praising the soap for highlighting mental health issues. Honour's other storylines include finding out that her marriage to Dave is invalid due to Dave still being married to his former wife, conflicts with her family, dealing with her son Mason Chen-Williams (Frank Kauer)'s involvement in an incel chatroom, being fired from her job, the breakdown of her relationship with Dave and kissing Tony Hutchinson (Nick Pickard). Honour later made an unannounced exit from the role, with Honour last appearing on 14 April 2023, when she left for a job in London. The character was criticised for being underused.

== Sam Chen-Williams ==
Sam Chen-Williams
- Hollyoaks character
- Portrayed by: Matthew McGivern
- Duration: 2021–2023
- First appearance: Episode 5743; 15 December 2021
- Last appearance: Episode 6212; 29 September 2023
- Introduced by: Lucy Allan
In-universe information
- Occupation: Police Officer
- Father: Dave Chen-Williams
- Mother: Flora Williams
- Stepmother: Honour Chen-Williams
- Sisters: Serena Chen-Williams (adoptive)
- Half-brothers: Mason Chen-Williams
- Half-sisters: Maxine Minniver; Lizzie Chen-Williams
- Uncles: Ethan Williams
- Nieces: Minnie Minniver

Sam Chen-Williams, played by Matthew McGivern, made his first appearance on 15 December 2021. Sam is a police officer and it was announced upon his casting that he would form a relationship with another character on the soap. This is later revealed to be Celeste Faroe (Andrea Ali), for whom he buys a bottle of champagne. Sam is later revealed to be a member of the Chen-Williams, a new family on Hollyoaks and the first East Asian family on a soap opera. An official Hollyoaks video highlighting the Chen-Williams family called Sam "The Bro with the complicated love life".

== Lizzie Chen-Williams ==
Lizzie Chen-Williams
- Hollyoaks character
- Portrayed by: Lily Best
- Duration: 2021–2024
- First appearance: Episode 5745; 17 December 2021
- Last appearance: Episode 6369; 7 May 2024
- Introduced by: Lucy Allan
In-universe information
- Occupation: Barmaid
- Mother: Flora Williams
- Adoptive father: Dave Chen-Williams
- Adoptive mother: Honour Chen-Williams
- Brothers: Mason Chen-Williams (adoptive)
- Sisters: Serena Chen-Williams (adoptive)
- Half-brothers: Sam Chen-Williams
- Half-sisters: Maxine Minniver (adoptive)
- Uncles: Ethan Williams (adoptive)
- Aunts: Mei Lian Leong (adoptive)
- First cousins: Shing Lin Leong (adoptive)

Lizzie Chen-Williams, played by Lily Best, made her first appearance on 17 December 2021 and her last appearance on 7 May 2024 when the character was killed off. The character was announced in the programme's 2021 winter trailer, where she was confirmed to be a new love interest for Sid Sumner (Billy Price). The trailer also showed her having a connection with Serena (Emma Lau), who had previously had a romantic interest in Sid. Later scenes confirmed that she is the stepsister of Serena. The role is Best's first television role following her education at the Italia Conti Academy of Theatre Arts. She described her audition process for Hollyoaks as one of the nicest that she had experienced, noting that it was relaxed and that the casting directors made her feel welcome. The final round of Best's audition process involved her visiting the Hollyoaks studio, which she found daunting. She found the cast and crew to be welcoming, and after she was informed that she had been cast as Lizzie, she cried due to feeling lucky. An official Hollyoaks video highlighting the Chen-Williams family called Lizzie "The sassy sister".

Lizzie was killed-off in a previously unannounced departure on 7 May 2024 after taking impure drugs sold by Warren Fox (Jamie Lomas).

Best described Lizzie as "the epitome of bubbly" and said that she "brings a really good energy into the room... unless you annoy her or upset her". When asked if her character has any secrets, Best opined that Lizzie is a fairly open character, but hinted that she has some underlying insecurities which viewers would see when she argues with Serena. Lizzie's debut formed part of the introduction of the Chen-Williams, a new family on Hollyoaks. On being introduced as part of the family, Best said that she felt lucky to be involved, especially due to the Chen-Williams being the first East Asian family on a soap opera. Speaking more about Lizzie's initial connection with Sid, the actress said that she likes Sid a lot due to seeing the real him. Lizzie is also initially unaware that Sid and her stepsister have shared a kiss. On it eventually being revealed to Lizzie, Best said that it would hit her "like a ton of bricks" due to not expecting it at all. However, she noted that despite her feelings for Sid, Lizzie would step aside and support Serena and Sid if they decided to pursue a romantic relationship. When the truth emerges, Sid affirms that he wants to continue his relationship with Lizzie. Best said that she likes Sid and Lizzie together due to their contrasting personalities, with Sid's moodiness and her own character being a "breath of fresh air". They both get jobs at The Dog in the Pond public house, which for Lizzie allows her to be creative and have fun. On the eventuality of more drama hitting her relationship with Sid, Best said that Lizzie would not enjoy the drama but would take it on due to being a "force to be reckoned with".

== Mason Chen-Williams ==
Mason Chen-Williams
- Hollyoaks character
- Portrayed by: Frank Kauer
- Duration: 2021–2024
- First appearance: Episode 5749; 23 December 2021
- Last appearance: Episode 6370; 8 May 2024 (appearance); Episode 6379; 21 May 2024 (video)
- Introduced by: Lucy Allan
In-universe information
- Occupation: Student
- Father: Dave Chen-Williams
- Mother: Honour Chen-Williams
- Sisters: Lizzie Chen-Williams (adoptive)
- Half-brothers: Sam Chen-Williams
- Half-sisters: Maxine Minniver; Serena Chen-Williams
- Uncles: Ethan Williams
- Aunts: Mei Lian Chen
- Nieces: Minnie Minniver
- First cousins: Shing Lin Leong

Mason Chen-Williams, played by Frank Kauer, made his first appearance on 23 December 2021 and his last appearance on 8 May 2024. His casting on Hollyoaks was announced on 18 December 2021, where he was revealed to be a member of the Chen-Williams, a new family on Hollyoaks and the first East Asian family on a soap opera. He is the youngest child of Dave (Dominic Power) and Honour (Vera Chok). He was described by producers as a "gentle soul whose attempts to fit in with the cool kids can often be misconstrued by other students". He was also described someone who is quieter than other boys his age that tends to overcompensate whilst attempting to be cool. An official Hollyoaks video highlighting the Chen-Williams family called Mason "The Magical Little Brother".

Mason made a previously unannounced departure on 8 May 2024, following the death of his sister Lizzie.

== Other characters ==
List of other characters (2021)
Character	Episode(s)	Original broadcast date(s)	Actor	Details
Susie	5505	14 January	Jo Mousley	A counsellor who meets with Darren Osborne (Ashley Taylor Dawson) and Mandy Richardson (Sarah Jayne Dunn) to discuss possible counselling sessions for Ella Richardson (Erin Palmer).
Solicitor	5507	19 January	Heather Phoenix	A solicitor who informs Tony Hutchinson (Nick Pickard), Diane Hutchinson (Alex Fletcher) and Verity Hutchinson (Eva O'Hara) that Edward Hutchinson (Joe McGann) has left his entire estate to Diane.
Doctor Palmer	5509	21 January	Polly Kilpatrick	A psychiatrist who visits Toby Faroe (Bobby Gordon) to see whether he is fit to be a kidney donor. While at Toby's house, Doctor Palmer accidentally finds a copy of The Red Door, and when Toby sees her with it, he flies into a rage and orders her to leave.
PC Allan	5522	9 February	Katherine Jack	A police officer who arrests Dr. Ley (Sabina Cameron) after Celeste Faroe (Andrea Ali) reports her for fraud.
Drew	5541	8 March	Joseph Carter	Two groomsmen who pursue Shaq Qureshi (Omar Malik) after he jilts his bride at the altar. Shaq is able to avoid the men after Cleo McQueen (Nadine Mulkerrin) lies to say she hadn't seen him hiding.
Rob	5541	8 March	Drew Jenkinson	Two groomsmen who pursue Shaq Qureshi (Omar Malik) after he jilts his bride at the altar. Shaq is able to avoid the men after Cleo McQueen (Nadine Mulkerrin) lies to say she hadn't seen him hiding.
Officiator	5546	15 March	Christine Walsh	A woman who officiates the wedding of Darren Osborne (Ashley Taylor Dawson) and Mandy Richardson (Sarah Jayne Dunn).
Police Officer	5547	16 March	Jessica May Buxton	A police officer who arrests Ella Richardson (Erin Palmer) for the murder of Jordan Price (Connor Calland).
Sasha	5550	19 March	Alicia Thompson	A drug dealer working for Victor Brothers (Benjamin O'Mahony) who contacted by Ste Hay (Kieron Richardson) and James Nightingale (Gregory Finnegan) for evidence to help free Juliet Nightingale (Niamh Blackshaw). After Sasha's phone is picked up by Victor, the pair presume that she has been killed, but she later arrives at Ste's house and gives him evidence that frees Juliet.
Katja	5556, 5585-5588	29 March, 7-12 May	Caroline Koziol	A delivery driver for laptops that Felix Westwood (Richard Blackwood) intercepts, pretending to be a police officer. However, Katja notices he doesn't have a stab vest and runs off. Felix catches her and ties her up in the van, driving her to mechanic's garage, where Warren Fox (Jamie Lomas) bundles her into a side room. When Maxine Minniver (Nikki Sanderson) comes looking for Brad King (Tom Benedict Knight), Katja unties herself and gets into the van, hitting Maxine with the vehicle as she escapes. Katya later returns and threatens Fergus Collins (Robert Beck) over "Operation Bluebird", but appears dissuaded after she is left unable to access crucial evidence, however, she threatens Fergus again by coming forward over the laptop robbery. Fergus attempts to call her bluff, but when it fails offers to pay her off. Katja demands £100,000, and Fergus later meets Warren and persuades him to kill their blackmailer. When Warren goes to carry out the deed, he realises that it's Katja and backs off. Joel Dexter (Rory Douglas-Speed) later comes across Katja begging and sits with her, when she tells him about the danger she's in, he encourages her to call the police until he hears that Warren was one of the men Katja was on about. Joel's kindness inspires Katja not to hand Fergus and Warren into the police, but she demands Fergus to pay her the money in monthly installments.
Callum	5562	6 April	Noah Valentine	A friend of Oliver Morgan's (Gabriel Clark) who is approached by Luke Morgan (Gary Lucy) in order to find Ollie after he learns about him being homeless. Luke hands Callum over the keys to his house to try and convince Ollie to return home.
Dr Parker	5564	8 April	Ben Addis	A doctor who sees Cindy Cunningham (Stephanie Waring) and Luke Morgan (Gary Lucy) over Luke's frontotemporal dementia. He informs the couple that Luke is progressing well and passed a memory test, but that stress could worsen his condition.
Alan	5569	15 April	Stephen Thompson	A delivery driver who talks to Grace Black (Tamara Wall) when she is late for a delivery at The Loft. As he and Grace talk, Martine Deveraux (Kéllé Bryan) approaches for the delivery of stock for Price Slice, but Alan turns her away unaware that she is the manager. Once Martine makes the situation clear, he apologises.
Patsy	5569, 5592	15 April, 18 May	Cassie Vallance	An interview for the "Businesswoman of the Year" Award who interviews Grace Black (Tamara Wall) and Martine Deveraux (Kéllé Bryan). Grace and Martine have different experiences with Patsy, with Grace getting along fine with her despite being late and Martine getting chastised for the same issue. After Martine wins the award, Patsy meets with her to discuss the responsibilities that come with the role, but chastises Martine for not paying attention. Martine later snaps at Patsy and orders her to leave.
Theo	5582	4 May	Bradley Clarkson	An English literature professor who Sienna Blake (Anna Passey) messages on a dating app. The pair agree to meet for a date, but when Theo changes the time, Summer Ranger (Rhiannon Clements) deletes the message and goes on the date with Theo herself, posing as Sienna. After the date is finished, Summer threatens Theo to stay away from Sienna.
Tommy Bradshaw	5586-5587	10-11 May	Zak Sutcliffe	A boy (Sutcliffe) and his stepfather (Tighe) who are admitted to the hospital after Tommy sprains his wrist and loses consciousness. Tommy tells Cleo McQueen (Nadine Mulkerrin) that he sustained the injury after falling down the stairs, but Cleo suspects there's something amiss due to Adrian's behaviour. When she has him alone, Tommy begins to explain that he hadn't fallen down, but they are interrupted by Adrian who prepares to discharge Tommy. Cleo later lies and claims doctors want to run more tests on Tommy due to his loss of consciousness and Adrian reluctantly readmits Tommy. The next day, Toby Faroe (Bobby Gordon) lets the air out of Adrian's tyres, so Cleo can continue to talk to Tommy who confirms that Adrian has abused him. However, as he's too scared to press charges, Adrian will go free. Cleo and Toby meet Adrian in the park and Toby punches him to the ground after getting goaded. Adrian recovers from the punch and walks into the police station. It's revealed the following episode that Adrian confessed to abusing Tommy, he was remanded into custody while Tommy went into social services to live with his aunt.
Adrian	5586-5587	10-11 May	Darren Tighe	
Newspaper Editor	5590	14 May	Chloe Okora	A newspaper editor and judge for Dee Valley Businesswoman of the year, who awards the title to Martine Deveraux (Kéllé Bryan).
Nurse	5590	14 May	Gemma Lawman	A nurse who calls Martine Deveraux (Kéllé Bryan) in to get the results of her biopsy.
Raya	5598	26 May	Payal Mistry	A student at Hollyoaks High who Juliet Nightingale (Niamh Blackshaw) sets Sid Sumner (Billy Price) up with on a blind date. However, when Raya hears Sid tell Juliet and Courtney Campbell (Amy Conachan) that he doesn't want to be on the date, she leaves.
Evie	5603	2 June	Georgia Conlan	A patient at a rehab centre that Oliver Morgan (Gabriel Clark) meets and starts dating. When Evie is thrown out of the centre, Ollie discharges himself to look after her and her son, Louie. When Cindy Cunningham (Stephanie Waring) meets Ollie, she is surprised by Evie and forbids to move in with them, fearing that is could worsen Luke Morgan's (Gary Lucy) condition. Cindy later meets with Ollie and pays him off to leave with Evie.
Midwife	5617	22 June	Rachel Toomes	A midwife who tells Mercedes McQueen (Jennifer Metcalfe) that she can't perform a baby scan on her due to Mercedes not being pregnant. She informs her that the likely reasons were a false positive or a miscarriage.
Interviewer	5621	28 June	Philip Cairns	An interviewer for a school in Stirling who offers Courtney Campbell (Amy Conachan) a job. Courtney is initially very excited to take the job, but grows reluctant after the interviewer tells her that she'll need to leave for the job that week.
PC Franks	5625-5753	30 June-29 December	Bronte Terrell	A police officer who arrests Grace Black (Tamara Wall) after Fergus Collins (Robert Beck) reports her for theft and threatening him with a weapon. After Brody Hudson (Adam Woodward) goes on the run, she approaches Timmy Simons (Sam Tutty) to ask if he knows about his whereabouts. After Price Slice is robbed, she speaks to Warren Fox (Jamie Lomas) about the break-in, but he denies all knowledge. After being tipped off, she arrests Felix Westwood (Richard Blackwood) and interviews him at the station. She releases Felix when Martine Deveraux (Kéllé Bryan) gives him an alibi, but informs Grace about Felix's alibi. Franks later attempts to arrest Brody for the murder of Liberty Savage (Jessamy Stoddart), but when she is distracted by Scott Drinkwell (Ross Adams), he is able to escape. When Leah Barnes (Elà-May Demircan) claims to have seen Summer Ranger (Rhiannon Clements). Franks takes Brody and Sienna Blake (Anna Passey) to a safe house. After Peri Lomax (Ruby O'Donnell) is stalked by Timmy, Franks informs Peri that his passport has been used to travel out of the country. She later meets Felix who gives her information on a heist that Warren and Fergus are planning, however the pair are tipped off that the police are onto them, so when Franks searches their van, she's unable to find anything.
Naomi	5623	30 June	Ellie Clayton	A prospective tenant for Fergus Collins (Robert Beck), but before she signs, Grace Black (Tamara Wall) pretends to be one of Fergus' tenants and tells a terrible story about what he's like as a landlord scaring Naomi off.
Henry Quentin	5627	6 July	Uncredited	The son of Becky Quentin (Katie McGlynn).
Hasina	5633	14 July	Buckso Dhillon Woolley	The adoptive mother of Shaq Qureshi (Omar Malik) who arrives to take him back home after Sami Maalik (Rishi Nair) calls her. Hasina disapproves of the way that Shaq is living, and of his girlfriend Theresa McQueen (Jorgie Porter), leading to an argument. Hasina later criticises Shaq in front of Misbah Maalik (Harvey Virdi) and Sami, leading Shaq to state his belief that Sami's father had an affair with Hasina, resulting in his birth. Hasina confirms this to be the truth.
Reporter	5659	19 August	Christopher Jefferies	A reporter who interviews Trish Minniver (Denise Welch) about her dance school, and watches Kathleen-Angel McQueen (Kiara Mellor) dance. When Leah Barnes (Elà-May Demircan) shows up and also performs, the reporter expresses concern after she injures her ankle.
Dealer	5563	25 August	Jon Boydon	A dealer who meets with Mercedes McQueen (Jennifer Metcalfe) to sell her drugs so that she can spike Donna-Marie Quinn (Lucy-Jo Hudson).
Demi	5563	25 August	Megan Morgan	A woman who Sid Sumner (Billy Price) begins talking to on a dating app. He initially hides the fact he has a prosthetic leg from Demi due to fear she will reject him; however, his friend Juliet Nightingale (Niamh Blackshaw) informs her and arranges a date between the pair. The date initially goes well, until Sid finds out that Juliet had told Demi about his leg, prompting him to walk out on her.
Jonnie Peacock	5664-5665	26-27 August	Himself	A Paralympic sprinter contacted by Imran Maalik (Ijaz Rana) to help Sid Sumner (Billy Price) come to terms with the loss of his leg. Jonnie acts as a guest speaker in a support group Sid reluctantly joins, and encourages Sid to talk to his friends.
Host	5665	27 August	Sian Lord	The host of an online support group that Sid Sumner (Billy Price) reluctantly joins. Upon hearing Sid's voice, she encourages him to speak to the group.
Keller	5666	30 August	Will Barnett	A thug who meets with Luke Morgan (Gary Lucy) claiming to know the identity of who his mother was meeting in prison. Keller reveals to Luke and his son Oliver Morgan (Gabriel Clark) and threatens them. Luke attempts to fight back, but both he and Ollie are mugged by Keller and a second thug.
DJ Target	5675	10 September	Himself	A DJ who performs at Walter Deveraux's (Trevor A. Toussaint) party after Prince McQueen (Malique Thompson-Dwyer) is unable to perform well.
Nige	5684	23 September	Dominic Doughty	A man at Donna-Marie Quinn's (Lucy-Jo Hudson) support group who she gets to pose as a pest control man to get rid of a mouse at the Salon de The.
Psychiatrist	5693	6 October	Kelly Hotten	A psychiatrist assigned to talk with Toby Faroe (Bobby Gordon) for his reasons to become a kidney donor. Due to flashbacks from his treatment with Dr. Ley (Sabina Cameron), Toby becomes agitated causing the psychiatrist to end the session.
Fernando	5702	19 October	Rocco Marazzita	A stripper hired by Goldie McQueen (Chelsee Healey) to entertain Nana McQueen (Diane Langton). However, after insulting Nana's age in the village, she chases him off before he can perform.
Len Goodman	5702-5703	19-20 October	Himself	A dancer and judge whose voice appears in Trish Minniver's (Denise Welch) head when she recalls slipping over at a dance competition he was commentating on. Len commentates on the Blackpoolapalooza, complimenting Leah Barnes' (Elà-May Demircan) dancing and announcing The Trish Minniver School of Dance as the winner.
Alan	5703	20 October	Torin Pocock	A hacker hired by Joel Dexter (Rory Douglas-Speed) to hack into Operation Bluebird, but Fergus Collins (Robert Beck) shuts down the servers before he's able to.
Photographer	5708	27 October	Jennifer Hulman	A photographer for The Chester Herald who Becky Quentin (Katie McGlynn) calls in a bid to improve the publicity for The Dog in the Pond public house. The photographer is impressed, however, when she captions the photos she mislabels Becky and Tony Hutchinson (Nick Pickard) as husband and wife.
Clarke	5712-5713	2-3 November	Edward Baker-Duly	The chairman of a law firm that James Nightingale (Gregory Finnegan) seeks to merge with. Although he makes sexist comments about Verity Hutchinson (Eva O'Hara), James allows him to move ahead with merging the companies. The next day, Clarke continues to make sexist comments, much to Verity's annoyance.
Mikey	5712-5714	2-4 November	Charlie Ellerton	The son of Clarke who approaches James Nightingale (Gregory Finnegan), Peri Lomax (Ruby O'Donnell) and Juliet Nightingale (Niamh Blackshaw) in the park to take photos of Peri and Juliet after having watched them on an illegal livestream. Mikey later arrives at James' to deliver papers to sign for the company merger, but after making degrading comments about Peri and Juliet, James attacks him. Mikey refrains from telling the police about James, but only on the condition that he help him get off a sexual assault charge. James agrees to do so, but Mikey reports the assault to the police anyway.
Journalist	5713	3 November	Aise Ndiele	A journalist from the Walford Gazette who interviews Cindy Cunningham (Stephanie Waring) about sustainable fashion following the success of a fashion show.
Viv	5717-5719	9-11 November	Velile Tshabalala	The mother of DeMarcus Westwood (Tomi Ade) who confronts Martine Deveraux (Kéllé Bryan) and DeMarcus when she finds out that he has not been attending school and had stolen off of a stall. She is sympathetic to what Martine is going through but resolves to take DeMarcus home with her. Martine pleads with her to let DeMarcus stay and although she is reluctant, Viv agrees.
Jacob	5719-5720	11-12 November	Luke Delaney	The thug who kidnaps Maxine Minniver (Nikki Sanderson) in order to transport her to be trafficked. Warren Fox (Jamie Lomas) is able to distract Jacob and another henchmen by making some noise, prompting the pair to leave and investigate.
Anne	5721	15 November	Tracy Wiles	A therapist for Diane Hutchinson (Alex Fletcher) who diagnoses her with OCD and explains how she will be able to cope with it in the future.
Photographer	5722	16 November	Al Bollands	A photographer who interviews Ali Shazad (Raji James) after he wins an award. He keeps recording when Shaq Qureshi (Omar Malik) accuses Ali of raping Misbah Maalik (Harvey Virdi).
Gina	5724	18 November	Grace Cookey-Gam	A victim of Ali Shazad (Raji James) who meets with Misbah Maalik (Harvey Virdi) after seeing the video where Ali is accused of rape. She and Misbah share their experiences which motivates Gina to make a police report against Ali, however, when she later accidentally runs into her, he intimidates her into withdrawing the report.
Prison Guard	5726-5728	22-24 November	Christian Anthony Greenway	A prison guard who supervises a visit between Warren Fox (Jamie Lomas) and Fergus Collins (Robert Beck) and cautions Warren when he loses his temper. The guard is later revealed to be under the employ of Fergus as he gets three prisoners to attack Warren, before getting a larger one when Warren defeats them. The prison guard calls for help after the attack and Warren is no longer breathing.
Client	5729	25 November	Robert Gill	The owner of the Brass Bath Hotel that meets with Ste Hay (Kieron Richardson) to talk about giving his cleaning company a contract for the hotel. Due to Ste's nervousness he's about to lose the contract until Sienna Blake (Anna Passey) poses as Sally St. Claire (Annie Wallace) and praises Ste for the work done at the school.
Minister	5729	25 November	Daniel Kobbina	A minister who marries Felix Westwood (Richard Blackwood) and Martine Deveraux (Kéllé Bryan).
PC Harvey	5735–5736	3–6 December	Lucy Lowe	A police officer who visits The Dog in the Pond public house when Tony Hutchinson (Nick Pickard) reports Theresa McQueen (Jorgie Porter), Nana McQueen (Diane Langton) and Goldie McQueen (Chelsee Healey) for a disturbance of the peace. Although she is dismissive of Tony's concerns, she does grow worried for Nana's health.
Filmmaker	5736	6 December	Steve Shirley	A filmmaker for a retirement home who hires Nana McQueen (Diane Langton) as a model. When Nana learns that the advert is for, she prepares to storm out until she hears that it's paid. But when the filmmaker suggests she move into the home for a documentary about herself, she loses her temper and leaves.
Mary	5743–5746	15–20 December	Ariana Dar	The daughter of a friend of Scott Drinkwell (Ross Adams) who he looks after when she goes to hospital. Scott enjoys the prospect of being a parent to Mary, but grows worried when he discovers that she stole an ornament to gift to him from Ripley Lennox (Ki Griffin). When they return Ripley says the gift had already been paid for.
Caitlin	5746	20 December	Johanna Hinton	A coroner approached by Sami Maalik (Rishi Nair) in order to threaten Ali Shazad (Raji James) into confessing to raping Misbah Maalik (Harvey Virdi). Sami tells Ali that Caitlin would record his murder as a suicide unless he handed himself in.
