= Emily Burnett =

Welsh actress

- Born: 8 August 1997 (age 27); Cardiff, Wales
- Occupation: Actress
- Years active: 2010–present
- Television: The Dumping Ground; So Awkward; Hollyoaks

Emily Burnett (born 8 August 1997) is a Welsh actress. From 2017 to 2019, she portrayed the role of Charlie Morris in the CBBC series The Dumping Ground, a role for which she won the 2019 British Academy Children's Award for Performer. In 2020, she portrayed the role of Jas Salford in fellow CBBC series So Awkward. In 2021, Burnett was cast in the Channel 4 soap opera Hollyoaks as Olivia Bradshaw.

== Early life ==
Burnett was born in Cardiff, Wales, where she went on to study art. She has cited her father as an influence for getting into acting, recalling that he introduced her to films at a young age.

== Career ==
In 2011, Burnett appeared in an episode of the CBBC series The Sparticle Mystery. She made her professional stage debut in a production of Love is the Revolution at the Soho Theatre. A year later, she starred in a production titled Beacons. In 2017, Burnett was cast in the CBBC series The Dumping Ground as Charlie Morris. She stayed in the series until 2019. For her role as Charlie, Burnett was awarded the 2019 British Academy Children's Award for Performer. She then starred in the S4C series Merched Parchus as Cai in 2019. A year later, Burnett was cast as Jas Salford in the CBBC series So Awkward (replacing Ameerah Falzon-Ojo). Later in 2020, she appeared in an episode of the BBC soap opera Doctors as Zadie Stiller. In 2021, Burnett was cast in the Channel 4 soap opera Hollyoaks as Olivia Bradshaw.

== Filmography ==
| Year | Title | Role | Notes |
|---|---|---|---|
| 2011 | The Sparticle Mystery | Daisy | Episode: "The Water Rats" |
| 2017–2019 | The Dumping Ground | Charlie Morris | Main role |
| 2019 | Warren | Hen 2 | Episode: "The Holiday" |
| 2019 | Merched Parchus | Cai | Main role |
| 2020 | On the Edge | Lauren | Episode: "BBW" |
| 2020 | Doctors | Zadie Stiller | Episode: "Wanted" |
| 2020 | So Awkward | Jas Salford | Main role |
| 2020 | The Dumping Ground Survival Files | Charlie Morris | Main role |
| 2021–2022 | Hollyoaks | Olivia Bradshaw | Series regular |

== Stage ==
| Year | Title | Role | Venue | Ref. |
|---|---|---|---|---|
| 2015 | First Love is the Revolution | Rdeca | Soho Theatre | |
| 2016 | Karagula | Various | Various | |
| 2016 | Beacons | Skye | Park Theatre | |
| 2017 | The Snow Queen | Gerda | Bristol Old Vic | |
| 2017 | Jack and the Beanstalk | Smart Simone | Oxford Playhouse | |
| 2019 | Princess & the Hustler | Lorna | Bristol Old Vic | |
| 2020 | The Bee in Me | Rachel Bagshaw | Unicorn Theatre | |

== Video games ==
| Year | Title | Role |
|---|---|---|
| 2021 | Doctor Who: The Lonely Assassins | Ayesha |
| 2024 | Metaphor: ReFantazio | Eupha |

== Awards and nominations ==
| Year | Ceremony | Category | Nominated work | Result | Ref. |
|---|---|---|---|---|---|
| 2019 | BAFTA Children's Awards | Performer | The Dumping Ground | Won | |
