= 2025 British Soap Awards =

Annual British TV awards ceremony

- Date: 31 May 2025
- Location: Hackney Empire, Hackney
- Country: United Kingdom
- Presented by: Various
- Hosted by: Jane McDonald
- Most awards: EastEnders (8)

Television/radio coverage
- Network: ITV1; ITVX; STV
- Runtime: 120 minutes

The 2025 British Soap Awards honoured the best in British soap operas throughout 2024 and 2025. The ceremony was held on 31 May 2025 at the Hackney Empire theatre in Hackney, London, and was broadcast on ITV1, ITVX and STV on 5 June 2025. After ITV cancelled the 2024 ceremony for undisclosed reasons, this marked the return of the awards after two years. Jane McDonald returned as presenter, having previously replaced disgraced former presenter Phillip Schofield in 2023. This was the final edition to be held prior to the cancellation.

The publicly voted categories were announced on 7 April 2025, with the vote opening that same day. This included a longlist for the Best Leading Performer accolade, which included four cast members from each respective soap. The British Soap Award for Best Comedy Performance was also turned to a publicly-voted accolade for the first time. The shortlist, including panel nominations, were released on 1 May 2025. Despite falling within the eligibility period, transmitting its final episode in November 2024, the ceremony marks the first since 2002 that BBC the medical soap opera Doctors was not considered for the awards.

EastEnders dominated the ceremony with eight wins, including Best British Soap, as well winning the other publicly-voted awards and four panel-voted awards. Hollyoaks won three panel-voted awards, while David Neilson won the British Soap Award for Outstanding Achievement for 30 years of playing Roy Cropper in Coronation Street. The Tony Warren Award was given to Emmerdale cameraman Mike Plant.

== Winners and nominees ==
=== Publicly voted ===
Award	Winner	Shortlisted (Note: These nominees were voted through to the shortlist round.)	Longlisted (Note: These nominees were unsuccessful in being voted through to the shortlist.)
Best British Soap (presented by Sir David Jason)	EastEnders	Coronation Street; Emmerdale; Hollyoaks	—N/a
Best Comedy Performance (presented by Fay Ripley)	Patsy Palmer (Bianca Jackson in EastEnders)	Jack P. Shepherd (David Platt in Coronation Street); Nicola Wheeler (Nicola King in Emmerdale); Nicole Barber-Lane (Myra McQueen in Hollyoaks)	—N/a
Best Leading Performer (presented by Delta Goodrem)	Lacey Turner (Stacey Slater in EastEnders)	Kellie Bright (Linda Carter in EastEnders); Beth Cordingly (Ruby Fox-Miligan in Emmerdale); Eden Taylor-Draper (Belle Dingle in Emmerdale)	Charlotte Jordan (Daisy Midgeley in Coronation Street); Alison King (Carla Connor in Coronation Street); Jack P. Shepherd (David Platt in Coronation Street); Channique Sterling-Brown (Dee Dee Bailey in Coronation Street); Diane Parish (Denise Fox in EastEnders); Angela Wynter (Yolande Trueman in EastEnders); Mark Charnock (Marlon Dingle in Emmerdale); Danny Miller (Aaron Dingle in Emmerdale); Jennifer Metcalfe (Mercedes McQueen in Hollyoaks); Nadine Mulkerrin (Cleo McQueen in Hollyoaks); Kieron Richardson (Ste Hay in Hollyoaks); Isabelle Smith (Frankie Osborne in Hollyoaks)
Villain of the Year (presented by Emmett J. Scanlan)	Navin Chowdhry (Nish Panesar in EastEnders)	Calum Lill (Joel Deering in Coronation Street); Ned Porteous (Joe Tate in Emmerdale); Tyler Conti (Abe Fielding in Hollyoaks)	—N/a

=== Panel voted ===
Award	Winner	Nominees
Best Dramatic Performance (presented by Angelica Bell and Danny Beard)	Steve McFadden (Phil Mitchell in EastEnders)	Peter Ash (Paul Foreman in Coronation Street); Eden Taylor-Draper (Belle Dingle in Emmerdale); Isabelle Smith (Frankie Osborne in Hollyoaks)
Best Family (presented by Kelvin Fletcher, Elizabeth Marsland and Marnie Fletcher)	The Osbornes (Hollyoaks)	The Platts (Coronation Street); The Slaters (EastEnders); The Dingles (Emmerdale)
Best Newcomer (presented by Denise Welch and Martin Kemp)	Isabelle Smith (Frankie Osborne in Hollyoaks)	Jacob Roberts (Kit Green in Coronation Street); Laura Doddington (Nicola Mitchell in EastEnders); Shebz Miah (Kammy Hadiq in Emmerdale)
Best On-Screen Partnership (presented by Chris Walker and Jan Pearson)	Rudolph Walker and Angela Wynter (Patrick and Yolande Trueman in EastEnders)	Alison King and Vicky Myers (Carla Connor and Lisa Swain in Coronation Street); William Ash and Beth Cordingly (Caleb Miligan and Ruby Fox-Miligan in Emmerdale); Nathaniel Dass and Oscar Curtis (Dillon Ray and Lucas Hay in Hollyoaks)
Best Single Episode (presented by Joe Absolom and Patsy Kensit)	"Phil's Psychosis: The Mitchells in 1985" (EastEnders)	"Mason's Death" (Coronation Street); "April's Life on the Streets" (Emmerdale); "Hollyoaks Time Jump" (Hollyoaks)
Best Storyline (presented by Larry Lamb)	Sibling Sexual Abuse (Hollyoaks)	Paul's Battle with MND (Coronation Street); Phil Mitchell: Hypermasculinity in Crisis (EastEnders); Belle & Tom: Domestic Abuse (Emmerdale)
Best Young Performer (presented Hattie Ryan & Karis Musongole)	Amelia Flanagan (April Windsor in Emmerdale)	Will Flanagan (Joseph Winter-Brown in Coronation Street); Sonny Kendall (Tommy Moon in EastEnders); Noah Holdsworth (Oscar Osborne in Hollyoaks)
Outstanding Achievement (presented by Julie Hesmondhalgh)	David Neilson (Roy Cropper in Coronation Street)	—N/a
Scene of the Year (presented by Tasha Ghouri and Richie Anderson)	EastEnders at 40: Angie Watts' Shock Return (EastEnders)	Mason's Death – The Effects of Knife Crime (Coronation Street); Amy's Deathly Plunge Reveals a Grisly Secret (Emmerdale); Mercedes Confronts Her Mortality (Hollyoaks)
The Tony Warren Award (presented by Natalie J Robb and Mark Charnock)	Mike Plant (Emmerdale)	—N/a

== Wins by soap ==
Soap opera	Wins
EastEnders	8
Hollyoaks	3
Emmerdale	2
Coronation Street	1
