= Inside Soap Awards =

British soap opera awards ceremony

- Awarded for: The best in British and Australian soap opera and its actors
- Country: United Kingdom
- Presented by: Inside Soap
- First award: 1996; 30 years ago
- Website: https://www.insidesoap.co.uk/

The Inside Soap Awards is a yearly British award ceremony run by Inside Soap magazine since 1996. The awards celebrate both British and Australian soap operas and their actors. The current soap operas nominated for awards are Casualty, Coronation Street, EastEnders, Emmerdale, Hollyoaks, Home and Away and Waterloo Road. Now defunct soaps that were formerly nominated for awards included Take the High Road, Springhill, Sunset Beach, The Bill, Bad Girls, Brookside, Crossroads, Doctors, Family Affairs, Night and Day, Where the Heart Is, Holby City and Neighbours.

== Winners ==
=== 1990s ===
==== 1993 ====
In 1993, readers of Inside Soap were asked to vote in the first and only Inside Soap TV Awards, a forerunner to the Inside Soap Awards which began in 1996.

Category	Winner	Soap
Best Soap	Home and Away	
Best Aussie Soap	Home and Away	
Best Actor in Soap	Les Hill	Home and Away
Best Actress in Soap	Rebekah Elmaloglou	Home and Away
Best Couple in Soap	Pippa Ross and Michael Ross	Home and Away
Best Male Character	Blake Dean	Home and Away
Best Female Character	Sophie Simpson	Home and Away
Soap's Biggest Bitch	Mandy Salter	EastEnders

==== 1996 ====
Category	Winner	Character(s)	Soap
Best British Soap	EastEnders		
Best Foreign Soap	Home and Away		
Favourite Soap	Home and Away		
Best Actor	Ross Kemp	Grant Mitchell	EastEnders
Best Actress	Melissa George	Angel Parrish	Home and Away
Best Couple	Dieter Brummer and Melissa George	Shane and Angel Parrish	Home and Away
Most annoying couple	Peter Baldwin and Thelma Barlow	Derek Wilton and Mavis Wilton	Coronation Street
Most annoying character	Adam Woodyatt	Ian Beale	EastEnders
Best single performance by a female	Melissa George	Angel's reaction to Shane's death	Home and Away
Best single performance by a male	Bill Treacher	Arthur's breakdown in prison	EastEnders
Silliest plot	Derek's gnomes in Coronation Street		Coronation Street
Biggest Soap Bitch	Claire King	Kim Tate	Emmerdale
Biggest bad guy	Simon Gregson	Steve McDonald	Coronation Street
Best Soap Plot	The Frank / Kim / Dave love triangle	Frank Tate, Kim Tate and Dave Glover	Emmerdale
Sexiest Male	Paul Nicholls	Joe Wicks	EastEnders
Sexiest Female	Kimberley Davies	Annalise Hartman	Neighbours
Best Newcomer	Paul Nicholls	Joe Wicks	EastEnders

==== 1997 ====
Category	Winner	Character(s)	Soap
Best British Soap	EastEnders		
Best Overseas Soap	Home and Away		
Best International Soap	EastEnders		
Best Actor	Bernard Curry	Luke Handley	Neighbours
Best Supporting Actor	Mark Homer	Tony Hills	EastEnders
Best Actress	Martine McCutcheon	Tiffany Mitchell	EastEnders
Best Supporting Actress	Patsy Palmer	Bianca Butcher	EastEnders
Best Couple	Sid Owen and Patsy Palmer	Ricky and Bianca Butcher	EastEnders
Best Soap Veteran	Anne Haddy	Helen Daniels	Neighbours
Best Young Actor	Gemma Bissix	Clare Bates	EastEnders
Sexiest Female	Martine McCutcheon	Tiffany Mitchell	EastEnders
Sexiest Male	Paul Nicholls	Joe Wicks	EastEnders
Most dramatic storyline	The death of the Farnham children	Brookside	

==== 1998 ====
Category	Winner	Character(s)	Soap
Best British Soap	EastEnders		
Best Overseas Soap	Home and Away		
Best International Soap	Coronation Street		
Best Actress	Martine McCutcheon	Tiffany Mitchell	EastEnders
Best Actor	Ross Kemp	Grant Mitchell	EastEnders
Most dramatic storyline	Anne Kirkbride	The jailing of Deirdre Rachid	Coronation Street
Sexiest Female	Martine McCutcheon	Tiffany Mitchell	EastEnders
Sexiest Male	Ross Kemp	Grant Mitchell	EastEnders
Funniest character	Lisa Riley	Mandy Dingle	Emmerdale
Best Young Actor	Georgia Taylor	Toyah Battersby	Coronation Street
Most missed character	Paul Bradley	Nigel Bates	EastEnders
Best Bad Boy	Paul Usher	Barry Grant	Brookside
Best Newcomer	Anna Brecon	Tara Reynolds	Emmerdale
Best Couple	Nic Testoni and Megan Connolly / Belinda Emmett	Travis and Rebecca Nash	Home and Away

==== 1999 ====
Category	Winner	Character(s)	Soap
Best British Soap	EastEnders		
Best Overseas Soap	Home and Away		
Best Actress	Patsy Palmer	Bianca Butcher	EastEnders
Best Actor	Joe Absolom	Matthew Rose	EastEnders
Sexiest Female	Tamzin Outhwaite	Mel Owen	EastEnders
Sexiest Male	Michael Greco	Beppe di Marco	EastEnders
Best Newcomer	Jack Ryder	Jamie Mitchell	Emmerdale
Best Young Actor	Alan Halsall	Tyrone Dobbs	Coronation Street
Best Storyline	Carol Harrison / Ross Kemp / Martine McCutcheon	The Louise / Grant / Tiffany love triangle	EastEnders
Most Missed Actor	Martine McCutcheon	Tiffany Mitchell	EastEnders
Soap star of the 90s	Martine McCutcheon	Tiffany Mitchell	EastEnders
Best comic performance	John Savident	Fred Elliott	Coronation Street
Best Bad Boy	Kevin Pallister	Graham Clark	EastEnders
Best Couple	Paul Loughran and Kate McGregor	Butch Dingle and Emily Wylie	Emmerdale

=== 2000s ===
==== 2000 ====
Category	Winner	Character(s)	Soap
Best British Soap	EastEnders		
Best Overseas Soap	Neighbours		
Best Actress	Jane Danson	Leanne Battersby	Coronation Street
Best Actor	Martin Kemp	Steve Owen	EastEnders
Best Young Actor	Alan Halsall	Tyrone Dobbs	Coronation Street
Best Storyline	Paul Loughran	The bus crash and Butch's death	Emmerdale
Sexiest Female	Tamzin Outhwaite	Mel Owen	EastEnders
Sexiest Male	Michael Greco	Beppe di Marco	EastEnders
Best Bad Boy	Lee Boardman	Jez Quigley	Coronation Street
Best Couple	Samantha Giles and John Middleton	Bernice Blackstock and Ashley Thomas	Emmerdale
Funniest character	Shaun Williamson	Barry Evans	EastEnders
Most Missed Character	Paul Loughran	Butch Dingle	Emmerdale
Best Newcomer	Tina O'Brien	Sarah Platt	Coronation Street

==== 2001 ====
Category	Winner	Character(s)	Soap
Best Soap	EastEnders		
Best Overseas Soap	Neighbours		
Best Actor	Martin Kemp	Steve Owen	EastEnders
Best Actress	June Brown	Dot Cotton	EastEnders
Best Young Actor	Jack P. Shepherd	David Platt	Coronation Street
Best Bad Boy	Jeff Hordley	Cain Dingle	Emmerdale
Best Bitch	Charlie Brooks	Janine Butcher	EastEnders
Best Couple	Kevin Kennedy and Angela Lonsdale	Curly and Emma Watts	Coronation Street
Funniest Character	Malcolm Hebden	Norris Cole	Coronation Street
Best Newcomer	Jessie Wallace	Kat Slater	EastEnders
Best Exit	Karen Drury	Susannah Morrisey	Brookside
Sexiest Female	Tracy Shaw	Maxine Peacock	Coronation Street
Sexiest Male	Michael Greco	Beppe di Marco	EastEnders
Best Storyline	Who Shot Phil?	Phil Mitchell, Steve Owen and Lisa Fowler	EastEnders
Best Dressed Soap Star	Joanna Taylor	Geri Hudson	Hollyoaks
Outstanding Achievement	Barbara Windsor	Peggy Mitchell	EastEnders

==== 2002 ====
Category	Winner	Character(s)	Soap
Best Soap	EastEnders		
Best Drama	The Bill		
Best Actor	Alex Ferns	Trevor Morgan	EastEnders
Best Actress	Kacey Ainsworth	Little Mo Mitchell	EastEnders
Best Young Actor	Ray Quinn	Anthony Murray	Brookside
Best Bad Boy	Brian Capron	Richard Hillman	Coronation Street
Best Bitch	Suranne Jones	Karen McDonald	Coronation Street
Best Couple	John Bardon and June Brown	Jim Branning and Dot Cotton	EastEnders
Funniest Character	Malcolm Hebden	Norris Cole	Coronation Street
Best Newcomer	Seamus Gubbins	Ray Mullan	Emmerdale
Sexiest Female	Jessie Wallace	Kat Slater	EastEnders
Sexiest Male	Jack Ryder	Jamie Mitchell	EastEnders
Best Storyline	Zoe discovers Kat is her mother	Kat Slater and Zoe Slater	EastEnders
Best Dressed Soap Star	Tracy Shaw	Maxine Peacock	Coronation Street
Outstanding Achievement	Bill Tarmey and Liz Dawn	Jack and Vera Duckworth	Coronation Street

==== 2003 ====
Category	Winner	Character(s)	Soap
Best Soap	EastEnders		
Best Drama	Bad Girls		
Best Actor	Steve McFadden	Phil Mitchell	EastEnders
Best Actress	Leah Bracknell	Zoe Tate	Emmerdale
Best Young Actor	Charley Webb	Debbie Dingle	Emmerdale
Best Bad Boy	Brian Capron	Richard Hillman	Coronation Street
Best Bitch	Kate Ford	Tracy Barlow	Coronation Street
Best Couple	Suranne Jones and Simon Gregson	Karen and Steve McDonald	Coronation Street
Best Family	The Moons	Alfie Moon, Kat Moon and Nana Moon, Spencer Moon	EastEnders
Funniest Character	Shane Richie	Alfie Moon	EastEnders
Best Newcomer	Shane Richie	Alfie Moon	EastEnders
Sexiest Female	Jessie Wallace	Kat Slater	EastEnders
Sexiest Male	Shane Richie	Alfie Moon	EastEnders
Best Storyline	Richard's Terror	Richard Hillman, Gail Hillman and Maxine Peacock	Coronation Street
Best Dressed Soap Star	Suranne Jones	Karen McDonald	Coronation Street
Outstanding Achievement	June Brown	Dot Branning	EastEnders

==== 2004 ====
Category	Winner	Character(s)	Soap
Best Soap	EastEnders		
Best Drama	The Bill		
Best Actor	Nigel Harman	Dennis Rickman	EastEnders
Best Actress	June Brown	Dot Branning	EastEnders
Best Young Actor	Sam Aston	Chesney Battersby-Brown	Coronation Street
Best Bad Boy	Jeff Hordley	Cain Dingle	Emmerdale
Best Bitch	Charlie Brooks	Janine Evans	EastEnders
Best Couple	Shane Richie and Jessie Wallace	Alfie and Kat Moon	EastEnders
Funniest Character	Andrew Whyment	Kirk Sutherland	Coronation Street
Best Newcomer	Sam Aston	Chesney Battersby-Brown	Coronation Street
Sexiest Female	Suranne Jones	Karen McDonald	Coronation Street
Sexiest Male	Nigel Harman	Dennis Rickman	EastEnders
Best Storyline	Tracy and Steve's One Night Stand	Tracy Barlow and Steve McDonald	Coronation Street
Best Snog	Bruno Langley and Chris Finch	Todd Grimshaw and Karl Foster	Coronation Street
Outstanding Achievement	Sue Nicholls	Audrey Roberts	Coronation Street

==== 2005 ====
Category	Winner	Character(s)	Soap
Best Soap	EastEnders		
Best Drama	Bad Girls		
Best Actor	Nigel Harman	Dennis Rickman	EastEnders
Best Actress	Sally Lindsay	Shelley Unwin	Coronation Street
Best Young Actor	Charley Webb	Debbie Dingle	Emmerdale
Best Bad Boy	Bill Ward	Charlie Stubbs	Coronation Street
Best Bitch	Patsy Kensit	Sadie King	Emmerdale
Best Couple	John Bardon and June Brown	Jim and Dot Branning	EastEnders
Best Family	The Dingles	Various	Emmerdale
Funniest Character	Antony Cotton	Sean Tully	Coronation Street
Best Newcomer	Antony Cotton	Sean Tully	Coronation Street
Sexiest Female	Samia Smith	Maria Sutherland	Coronation Street
Sexiest Male	Nigel Harman	Dennis Rickman	EastEnders
Best Storyline	Dirty Den's Murder	Den Watts, Chrissie Watts, Zoe Slater, Sam Mitchell	EastEnders
Best Dressed Soap Star	Tracy-Ann Oberman	Chrissie Watts	EastEnders
Outstanding Achievement	Letitia Dean	Sharon Watts	EastEnders

==== 2006 ====
Category	Winner	Character(s)	Soap
Best Soap	EastEnders		
Best Drama	The Bill		
Best Actor	Bradley Walsh	Danny Baldwin	Coronation Street
Best Actress	Lacey Turner	Stacey Slater	EastEnders
Best Young Actor	Ellis Hollins	Tom Cunningham	Hollyoaks
Best Bad Boy	Bill Ward	Charlie Stubbs	Coronation Street
Best Bitch	Patsy Kensit	Sadie King	Emmerdale
Best Couple	Charlie Clements and Lacey Turner	Bradley Branning and Stacey Slater	EastEnders
Best Family	The Mitchells	Various	EastEnders
Funniest Character	Antony Cotton	Sean Tully	Coronation Street
Best Newcomer	Charlie Clements	Bradley Branning	EastEnders
Sexiest Female	Kara Tointon	Dawn Swann	EastEnders
Sexiest Male	Richard Fleeshman	Craig Harris	Coronation Street
Best Storyline	Alice's cancer battle	Alice and Sam Dingle	Emmerdale
Best Dressed Soap Star	Samia Smith	Maria Sutherland	Coronation Street
Outstanding Achievement	Helen Worth	Gail Platt	Coronation Street

==== 2007 ====
Category	Winner	Character(s)	Soap
Best Soap	Coronation Street		
Best Drama	The Bill		
Best Actor	Antony Cotton	Sean Tully	Coronation Street
Best Actress	Lacey Turner	Stacey Slater	EastEnders
Best Young Actor	Eden Taylor-Draper	Belle Dingle	Emmerdale
Best Bad Boy	Jack P. Shepherd	David Platt	Coronation Street
Best Bitch	Sophie Thompson	Stella Crawford	EastEnders
Best Couple	Charlie Clements and Lacey Turner	Bradley Branning and Stacey Slater	EastEnders
Funniest Performance	Charlie Hardwick	Val Pollard	Emmerdale
Best Newcomer	Rob James-Collier	Liam Connor	Coronation Street
Sexiest Female	Roxanne McKee	Louise Summers	Hollyoaks
Sexiest Male	Rob James-Collier	Liam Connor	Coronation Street
Best Storyline	Stella's Torment of Ben	Stella Crawford and Ben Mitchell	EastEnders
Best Dressed Soap Star	Kara Tointon	Dawn Swann	EastEnders

==== 2008 ====
Category	Winner	Character(s)	Soap
Best Soap	EastEnders		
Best Drama	The Bill		
Best Actor	Robert Kazinsky	Sean Slater	EastEnders
Best Actress	Lacey Turner	Stacey Branning	EastEnders
Best Young Actor	Ellis Hollins	Tom Cunningham	Hollyoaks
Best Bad Boy	Jack P. Shepherd	David Platt	Coronation Street
Best Bitch	Alison King	Carla Connor	Coronation Street
Best Couple	Charlie Clements and Lacey Turner	Bradley and Stacey Branning	EastEnders
Funniest Character	Cheryl Fergison	Heather Trott	EastEnders
Best Newcomer	Rita Simons	Roxy Mitchell	EastEnders
Sexiest Female	Kara Tointon	Dawn Swann	EastEnders
Sexiest Male	Robert Kazinsky	Sean Slater	EastEnders
Best Storyline	The Aftermath of Max and Stacey's affair	Max Branning, Bradley Branning, Stacey Branning and Tanya Branning	EastEnders
Best Dressed Soap Star	Kym Marsh	Michelle Connor	Coronation Street
Outstanding Achievement	Chris Chittell	Eric Pollard	Emmerdale

==== 2009 ====
Category	Winner	Character(s)	Soap
Best Soap	EastEnders		
Best Drama	The Bill		
Best Actor	Gray O'Brien	Tony Gordon	Coronation Street
Best Actress	Lacey Turner	Stacey Slater	EastEnders
Best Young Actor	Alex Bain	Simon Barlow	Coronation Street
Best Bad Boy	Larry Lamb	Archie Mitchell	EastEnders
Best Bitch	Charlie Brooks	Janine Butcher	EastEnders
Funniest Character	Maggie Jones	Blanche Hunt	Coronation Street
Best Newcomer	Craig Gazey	Graeme Proctor	Coronation Street
Sexiest Female	Michelle Keegan	Tina McIntyre	Coronation Street
Sexiest Male	John Partridge	Christian Clarke	EastEnders
Best Storyline	Archie's torment and Danielle's death	Archie Mitchell, Danielle Jones and Ronnie Mitchell	EastEnders
Best Dressed Soap Star	Kara Tointon	Dawn Swann	EastEnders
Best Family	The McQueens	Various	Hollyoaks

=== 2010s ===
==== 2010 ====
Category	Winner	Character(s)	Soap
Best Soap	EastEnders		
Best Actor	Danny Miller	Aaron Livesy	Emmerdale
Best Actress	Lacey Turner	Stacey Slater	EastEnders
Best Young Actor	Alex Bain	Simon Barlow	Coronation Street
Best Dramatic Performance	Danny Miller	Aaron Livesy	Emmerdale
Funniest Character	Craig Gazey	Graeme Proctor	Coronation Street
Best Newcomer	Ricky Norwood	Fatboy	EastEnders
Best Exit	Charlie Clements	Bradley Branning	EastEnders
Best Wedding	Marc Elliott and Preeya Kalidas	Syed Masood and Amira Shah	EastEnders
Best Stunt	The Factory Siege	Tony Gordon, Carla Connor, Hayley Cropper, Maria Connor	Coronation Street
Sexiest Female	Michelle Keegan	Tina McIntyre	Coronation Street
Sexiest Male	Scott Maslen	Jack Branning	EastEnders
Best Drama	Waterloo Road		
Best Daytime Soap	Neighbours		
Best Daytime Star	Ryan Moloney	Toadie Rebecchi	Neighbours

==== 2011 ====
Category	Winner	Character(s)	Soap
Best Soap	EastEnders		
Best Actor	Danny Miller	Aaron Livesy	Emmerdale
Best Actress	Jessie Wallace	Kat Moon	EastEnders
Best Young Actor	Maisie Smith	Tiffany Butcher	EastEnders
Best Dramatic Performance	Danny Miller	Aaron Livesy	Emmerdale
Funniest Character	Tameka Empson	Kim Fox	EastEnders
Best Newcomer	Emmett J. Scanlan	Brendan Brady	Hollyoaks
Best Exit	Bill Tarmey	Jack Duckworth	Coronation Street
Best Wedding	Himesh Patel and Meryl Fernandes	Tamwar Masood and Afia Khan	EastEnders
Sexiest Female	Michelle Keegan	Tina McIntyre	Coronation Street
Sexiest Male	Danny Mac	Dodger Savage	Hollyoaks
Best Drama	Waterloo Road		
Best Daytime Soap	Home and Away		
Best Daytime Star	Ryan Moloney	Toadie Rebecchi	Neighbours
Outstanding Achievement	Coronation Street		

==== 2012 ====
Category	Winner	Character(s)	Soap
Best Soap	EastEnders		
Best Actor	Emmett J. Scanlan	Brendan Brady	Hollyoaks
Best Actress	Gillian Wright	Jean Slater	EastEnders
Best Young Actor	Alex Bain	Simon Barlow	Coronation Street
Funniest Male	Ricky Norwood	Fatboy	EastEnders
Funniest Female	Tameka Empson	Kim Fox	EastEnders
Best Newcomer	Hetti Bywater	Lucy Beale	EastEnders
Best Bad Boy	Emmett J. Scanlan	Brendan Brady	Hollyoaks
Best Bitch	Charlie Brooks	Janine Butcher	EastEnders
Sexiest Female	Michelle Keegan	Tina McIntyre	Coronation Street
Sexiest Male	David Witts	Joey Branning	EastEnders
Best Dressed Soap Star	Michelle Keegan	Tina McIntyre	Coronation Street
Best Drama	Waterloo Road		
Best Daytime Soap	Neighbours		
Best Daytime Star	Ryan Moloney	Toadie Rebecchi	Neighbours

==== 2013 ====
Category	Winner	Character(s)	Soap
Best Soap	Emmerdale		
Best Actor	David Neilson	Roy Cropper	Coronation Street
Best Actress	Jacqueline Jossa	Lauren Branning	EastEnders
Best Young Actor	Maisie Smith	Tiffany Butcher	EastEnders
Funniest Male	Simon Gregson	Steve McDonald	Coronation Street
Funniest Female	Tameka Empson	Kim Fox	EastEnders
Best Newcomer	Khali Best	Dexter Hartman	EastEnders
Best Bad Boy	Dominic Power	Cameron Murray	Emmerdale
Best Bitch	Natalie Gumede	Kirsty Soames	Coronation Street
Sexiest Female	Michelle Keegan	Tina McIntyre	Coronation Street
Sexiest Male	Danny Mac	Dodger Savage	Hollyoaks
Best Storyline	Cameron's Killer Cover-Up	Cameron Murray, Debbie Dingle, Chas Dingle	Emmerdale
Best Drama	Waterloo Road		
Best Daytime Soap	Home and Away		
Best Daytime Star	Steve Peacocke	Darryl Braxton	Home and Away

==== 2014 ====
Category	Winner	Character(s)	Soap
Best Soap	EastEnders		
Best Actor	Danny Dyer	Mick Carter	EastEnders
Best Actress	Nikki Sanderson	Maxine Minniver	Hollyoaks
Best Young Actor	Amelia Flanagan	April Windsor	Emmerdale
Best Family	The Carters	Various	EastEnders
Funniest Male	Simon Gregson	Steve McDonald	Coronation Street
Funniest Female	Laura Norton	Kerry Wyatt	Emmerdale
Best Newcomer	Michael Parr	Ross Barton	Emmerdale
Best Bad Boy	Marc Baylis	Rob Donovan	Coronation Street
Best Bitch	Kate Ford	Tracy Barlow	Coronation Street
Sexiest Female	Jacqueline Jossa	Lauren Branning	EastEnders
Sexiest Male	Danny Mac	Dodger Savage	Hollyoaks
Best Storyline	Maxine and Patrick's Domestic Abuse	Maxine Minniver, Patrick Blake	Hollyoaks
Best Drama	Waterloo Road		
Best Daytime Soap	Neighbours		
Best Daytime Star	Lincoln Younes	Casey Braxton	Home and Away

==== 2015 ====
Category	Winner	Character(s)	Soap
Best Soap	Emmerdale		
Best Actor	Michael Parr	Ross Barton	Emmerdale
Best Actress	Alison King	Carla Connor	Coronation Street
Best Young Actor	Amelia Flanagan	April Windsor	Emmerdale
Funniest Male	Joe Duttine	Tim Metcalfe	Coronation Street
Funniest Female	Tameka Empson	Kim Fox-Hubbard	EastEnders
Best Newcomer	Ryan Hawley	Robert Sugden	Emmerdale
Best Bad Boy	Michael Parr	Ross Barton	Emmerdale
Best Bad Girl	Kate Ford	Tracy Barlow	Coronation Street
Sexiest Female	Jennifer Metcalfe	Mercedes McQueen	Hollyoaks
Sexiest Male	Michael Parr	Ross Barton	Emmerdale
Best Shock Twist	Bobby kills Lucy	Bobby Beale, Jane Beale and Lucy Beale	EastEnders
Best Affair	Charley Webb and Michael Parr	Debbie Dingle and Ross Barton	Emmerdale
Best Partnership	Charlie Hardwick and Chris Chittell	Val and Eric Pollard	Emmerdale
Best Show-Stopper	The Live Episode		EastEnders
Best Drama	Casualty		
Best Daytime Soap	Neighbours		
Best Daytime Star	Jackie Woodburne	Susan Kennedy	Neighbours

==== 2016 ====
Category	Winner	Nominees
Best Soap	Emmerdale	Coronation Street; EastEnders; Hollyoaks
Best Actor	Steve McFadden (Phil Mitchell in EastEnders)	Jack P. Shepherd (David Platt in Coronation Street); Danny Dyer (Mick Carter in EastEnders); Danny Miller (Aaron Dingle in Emmerdale)
Best Actress	Lacey Turner (Stacey Fowler in EastEnders)	Paula Lane (Kylie Platt in Coronation Street); Tina O'Brien (Sarah Platt in Coronation Street); Lucy Pargeter (Chas Dingle in Emmerdale)
Best Young Actor	Amelia Flanagan (April Windsor in Emmerdale)	Elle Mulvaney (Amy Barlow in Coronation Street); Isobel Steele (Liv Flaherty in Emmerdale); Ruby O'Donnell (Peri Lomax in Hollyoaks)
Funniest Male	Joe Duttine (Tim Metcalfe in Coronation Street)	Simon Gregson (Steve McDonald in Coronation Street); Danny Dyer (Mick Carter in EastEnders); Matthew Wolfenden (David Metcalfe in Emmerdale)
Funniest Female	Tameka Empson (Kim Fox-Hubbard in EastEnders)	Patti Clare (Mary Taylor in Coronation Street); Laura Norton (Kerry Wyatt in Emmerdale); Nicole Barber-Lane (Myra McQueen in Hollyoaks)
Best Newcomer	Shayne Ward (Aidan Connor in Coronation Street)	Liam Bairstow (Alex Warner in Coronation Street); Isobel Steele (Liv Flaherty in Emmerdale); Richard Linnell (Alfie Nightingale in Hollyoaks)
Best Bad Boy	Connor McIntyre (Pat Phelan in Coronation Street)	Eliot Carrington (Bobby Beale in EastEnders); Jeff Hordley (Cain Dingle in Emmerdale); Greg Wood (Trevor Royle in Hollyoaks)
Best Bad Girl	Persephone Swales-Dawson (Nico Blake in Hollyoaks)	Kate Ford (Tracy Barlow in Coronation Street); Annette Badland (Babe Smith in EastEnders); Emma Atkins (Charity Dingle in Emmerdale)
Sexiest Female	Jacqueline Jossa (Lauren Branning in EastEnders)	Kym Marsh (Michelle Connor in Coronation Street); Gemma Atkinson (Carly Hope in Emmerdale); Jennifer Metcalfe (Mercedes McQueen in Hollyoaks)
Sexiest Male	Charlie Clapham (Freddie Roscoe in Hollyoaks)	Shayne Ward (Aidan Connor in Coronation Street); Danny Dyer (Mick Carter in EastEnders); Michael Parr (Ross Barton in Emmerdale)
Best Shock Twist	Val dies in the Hall of Mirrors (Emmerdale)	Kylie kills Callum (Coronation Street); Bobby attacks Jane and confesses all (EastEnders); Trevor is murdered by Nico (Hollyoaks)
Best Exit	Barbara Windsor (Peggy Mitchell in EastEnders)	Sean Ward (Callum Logan in Coronation Street); Charlie Hardwick (Val Pollard in Emmerdale); Greg Wood (Trevor Royle in Hollyoaks)
Best Partnership	Danny Miller and Ryan Hawley (Aaron Dingle and Robert Sugden in Emmerdale)	Joe Duttine and Sally Dynevor (Tim and Sally Metcalfe in Coronation Street); James Bye and Lacey Turner (Martin and Stacey Fowler in EastEnders); Nick Miles and Nicola Wheeler (Jimmy and Nicola King in Emmerdale)
Best Show-Stopper	The Live Episode (Coronation Street)	Stacey being sectioned (EastEnders); Wedding day helicopter crash (Emmerdale); Roscoes in the river (Hollyoaks)
Best Drama Star	Derek Thompson (Charlie Fairhead in Casualty)	Amanda Mealing (Connie Beauchamp in Casualty); David Ames (Dominic Copeland in Holby City); Rob Ostlere (Arthur Digby in Holby City)
Best Drama Storyline	Arthur's death (Holby City)	Charlie's near-death experience (Casualty); Ethan and Cal meet their mum (Casualty); Fletch saves the day (Holby City)
Best Daytime Soap	Neighbours	Doctors; Home and Away
Best Daytime Star	Alan Fletcher (Karl Kennedy in Neighbours)	Lorna Laidlaw (Mrs. Tembe in Doctors); Lynne McGranger (Irene Roberts in Home and Away); Bonnie Sveen (Ricky Sharpe in Home and Away)

==== 2017 ====
Category	Winner	Nominees
Best Soap	Emmerdale	Coronation Street; EastEnders; Hollyoaks
Best Actor	Danny Miller (Aaron Dingle in Emmerdale)	Simon Gregson (Steve McDonald in Coronation Street); Danny Dyer (Mick Carter in EastEnders); John Middleton (Ashley Thomas in Emmerdale)
Best Actress	Lucy Fallon (Bethany Platt in Coronation Street)	Charlotte Bellamy (Laurel Thomas in Emmerdale); Zoë Henry (Rhona Goskirk in Emmerdale); Anna Passey (Sienna Blake in Hollyoaks)
Best Young Actor	Alfie Clarke (Arthur Thomas in Emmerdale)	Matilda Freeman (Summer Spellman in Coronation Street); Amelia Flanagan (April Windsor in Emmerdale); Elà-May Demircan (Leah Barnes in Hollyoaks)
Funniest Male	Dominic Brunt (Paddy Kirk in Emmerdale)	Simon Gregson (Steve McDonald in Coronation Street); Nick Miles (Jimmy King in Emmerdale); Ashley Taylor Dawson (Darren Osborne in Hollyoaks)
Funniest Female	Dolly-Rose Campbell (Gemma Winter in Coronation Street)	Tameka Empson (Kim Fox-Hubbard in EastEnders); Sally Dexter (Faith Dingle in Emmerdale); Nicole Barber-Lane (Myra McQueen in Hollyoaks)
Best Newcomer	Julia Goulding (Shona Ramsey in Coronation Street)	Rob Mallard (Daniel Osbourne in Coronation Street); Lee Ryan (Woody Woodward in EastEnders); Sally Dexter (Faith Dingle in Emmerdale)
Best Bad Boy	Connor McIntyre (Pat Phelan in Coronation Street)	Jake Wood (Max Branning in EastEnders); Ryan Hawley (Robert Sugden in Emmerdale); Jamie Lomas (Warren Fox in Hollyoaks)
Best Bad Girl	Gillian Kearney (Emma Barton in Emmerdale)	Lorna Fitzgerald (Abi Branning in EastEnders); Emma Atkins (Charity Dingle in Emmerdale); Tamara Wall (Grace Black in Hollyoaks)
Sexiest Female	Natalie J. Robb (Moira Dingle in Emmerdale)	Catherine Tyldesley (Eva Price in Coronation Street); Jacqueline Jossa (Lauren Branning in EastEnders); Jennifer Metcalfe (Mercedes McQueen in Hollyoaks)
Sexiest Male	Davood Ghadami (Kush Kazemi in EastEnders)	Sam Robertson (Adam Barlow in Coronation Street); Michael Parr (Ross Barton in Emmerdale); Matthew Wolfenden (David Metcalfe in Emmerdale)
Best Shock Twist	Andy's alive (Coronation Street)	Holly's death (Emmerdale); James is killed by Emma (Emmerdale); Nathan's death (Hollyoaks)
Best Exit	John Middleton (Ashley Thomas in Emmerdale)	Samantha Womack and Rita Simons (Ronnie Branning and Roxy Mitchell in EastEnders); Bill Ward (James Barton in Emmerdale); Kassius Nelson (Jade Albright in Hollyoaks)
Best Partnership	Lysette Anthony and Nicole Barber-Lane (Marnie Nightingale and Myra McQueen in Hollyoaks)	Colson Smith and Lucy Fallon (Craig Tinker and Bethany Platt in Coronation Street); John Middleton and Charlotte Bellamy (Ashley and Laurel Thomas in Emmerdale); Ryan Hawley and Danny Miller (Robert Sugden and Aaron Dingle in Emmerdale)
Best Show-Stopper	Motorway crash/James' death	Michelle and Steve lose their son (Coronation Street); Ronnie and Roxy's deaths (EastEnders); Jade's death (Hollyoaks)
Outstanding Achievement	Gillian Taylforth (Kathy Beale in EastEnders)	
Best Drama Star	George Rainsford (Ethan Hardy in Casualty)	Amanda Mealing (Connie Beauchamp in Casualty); Derek Thompson (Charlie Fairhead in Casualty); David Ames (Dominic Copeland in Holby City)
Best Drama Storyline	The helicopter crash (Casualty)	Cal's murder (Casualty); Charlie and Duffy's wedding (Casualty); Dom's abuse (Holby City)
Best Daytime Soap	Neighbours	Doctors; Home and Away
Best Daytime Star	Lorna Laidlaw (Mrs Tembe in Doctors)	Lynne McGranger (Irene Roberts in Home and Away); Stefan Dennis (Paul Robinson in Neighbours); Ryan Moloney (Toadie Rebecchi in Neighbours)

==== 2018 ====
The winners were announced on 22 October 2018.

Category	Winner	Nominees
Best Soap	Coronation Street	EastEnders; Emmerdale; Hollyoaks
Best Actor	Jack P. Shepherd (David Platt in Coronation Street)	Shayne Ward (Aidan Connor in Coronation Street); Danny Dyer (Mick Carter in EastEnders); Gregory Finnegan (James Nightingale in Hollyoaks)
Best Actress	Emma Atkins (Charity Dingle in Emmerdale)	Lucy Fallon (Bethany Platt in Coronation Street); Catherine Tyldesley (Eva Price in Coronation Street); Bonnie Langford (Carmel Kazemi in EastEnders)
Best Young Actor	Isobel Steele (Liv Flaherty in Emmerdale)	Kyran Bowes (Jack Webster in Coronation Street); Maisie Smith (Tiffany Butcher in EastEnders); Aedan Duckworth (Oliver Morgan in Hollyoaks)
Funniest Male	Simon Gregson (Steve McDonald in Coronation Street)	Joe Duttine (Tim Metcalfe in Coronation Street); Mark Charnock (Marlon Dingle in Emmerdale); Shaun Thomas (Gerry Roberts in Emmerdale)
Funniest Female	Dolly-Rose Campbell (Gemma Winter in Coronation Street)	Tameka Empson (Kim Fox-Hubbard in EastEnders); Lorraine Stanley (Karen Taylor in EastEnders); Nicole Barber-Lane (Myra McQueen in Hollyoaks)
Best Newcomer	Ash Palmisciano (Matty Barton in Emmerdale)	James Burrows (Ali Neeson in Coronation Street); Tony Clay (Callum "Halfway" Highway in EastEnders); Rishi Nair (Sami Maalik in Hollyoaks)
Best Bad Boy	Connor McIntyre (Pat Phelan in Coronation Street)	Ricky Champ (Stuart Highway in EastEnders); Thomas Atkinson (Lachlan White in Emmerdale); Ned Porteous (Joe Tate in Emmerdale)
Best Bad Girl	Mollie Winnard (Kayla Clifton in Coronation Street)	Tanya Franks (Rainie Branning in EastEnders); Sally Dexter (Faith Dingle in Emmerdale); Tamara Wall (Grace Black in Hollyoaks)
Soap Superstar (Female)	Jennifer Metcalfe (Mercedes McQueen in Hollyoaks)	—N/a
Soap Superstar (Male)	Danny Miller (Aaron Dingle in Emmerdale)	—N/a
Best Shock Twist	Anna returns to kill Phelan (Coronation Street)	Lachlan kills Gerry (Emmerdale); Moira gives birth (Emmerdale); Nico's alive/Sienna kills Nico (Hollyoaks)
Best Exit	Shayne Ward (Aidan Connor in Coronation Street)	Connor McIntyre (Pat Phelan in Coronation Street); Shaheen Jafargholi (Shakil Kazemi in EastEnders); Shaun Thomas (Gerry Roberts in Emmerdale)
Best Partnership	Danny Dyer and Kellie Bright (Mick and Linda Carter in EastEnders)	Jack P. Shepherd and Julia Goulding (David Platt and Shona Ramsey in Coronation Street); Danny Miller and Ryan Hawley (Aaron Dingle and Robert Sugden in Emmerdale); Jacob Roberts and Adam Woodward (Damon Kinsella and Brody Hudson in Hollyoaks)
Best Show-Stopper	Keegan and Shakil's knife attack (EastEnders)	Aidan takes his own life (Coronation Street); Phelan's last stand (Coronation Street); High school explosion/Neeta dies (Hollyoaks)
Best Drama Star	Chelsea Halfpenny (Alicia Munroe in Casualty)	William Beck (Dylan Keogh in Casualty); Amanda Mealing (Connie Beauchamp in Casualty); Rosie Marcel (Jac Naylor in Holby City)
Best Drama Storyline	The hospital shooting (Holby City)	Alicia's rape (Casualty); Connie's cancer (Casualty); John Gaskell's journey to the dark side (Holby City)
Best Daytime Soap	Doctors	Home and Away; Neighbours
Best Daytime Star	Ray Meagher (Alf Stewart in Home and Away)	Chris Walker (Rob Hollins in Doctors); Jake Ryan (Robbo in Home and Away); Jackie Woodburne (Susan Kennedy in Neighbours)

==== 2019 ====
The longlist was announced on 1 July 2019. The winners were announced on 7 October 2019.

Category	Winner	Nominees
Best Soap	Hollyoaks	Coronation Street; EastEnders; Emmerdale
Best Actor	Adam Woodward (Brody Hudson in Hollyoaks)	Jack P. Shepherd (David Platt in Coronation Street); Danny Dyer (Mick Carter in EastEnders); Jeff Hordley (Cain Dingle in Emmerdale)
Best Actress	Stephanie Davis (Sinead Shelby in Hollyoaks)	Alison King (Carla Connor in Coronation Street); Gillian Wright (Jean Slater in EastEnders); Lucy Pargeter (Chas Dingle in Emmerdale)
Best Young Actor	Kara-Leah Fernandes (Bailey Baker in EastEnders)	Amelia Flanagan (April Windsor in Emmerdale); Joe-Warren Plant (Jacob Gallagher in Emmerdale); Aedan Duckworth (Oliver Morgan in Hollyoaks); Bleu Landau (Dennis Rickman Jnr in EastEnders)
Funniest Male	Danny Dyer (Mick Carter in EastEnders)	Joe Duttine (Tim Metcalfe in Coronation Street); Dominic Brunt (Paddy Kirk in Emmerdale); Ashley Taylor Dawson (Darren Osborne in Hollyoaks)
Funniest Female	Lorraine Stanley (Karen Taylor in EastEnders)	Patti Clare (Mary Taylor in Coronation Street); Maureen Lipman (Evelyn Plummer in Coronation Street); Sally Dexter (Faith Dingle in Emmerdale)
Best Newcomer	Maureen Lipman (Evelyn Plummer in Coronation Street)	Max Bowden (Ben Mitchell in EastEnders); Jessica Plummer (Chantelle Atkins in EastEnders); Niamh Blackshaw (Juliet Quinn in Hollyoaks)
Best Bad Boy	Max Bowden (Ben Mitchell in EastEnders)	Mikey North (Gary Windass in Coronation Street); Ricky Champ (Stuart Highway in EastEnders); Kyle Pryor (Laurie Shelby in Hollyoaks)
Best Bad Girl	Louisa Clein (Maya Stepney in Emmerdale)	Tanya Franks (Rainie Branning in EastEnders); Claire King (Kim Tate in Emmerdale); Jennifer Metcalfe (Mercedes McQueen in Hollyoaks)
Soap Superstar	Sally Dynevor (Sally Metcalfe in Coronation Street)	
Best Shock Twist	Flashback to the Big Night Out (Emmerdale)	Gary is the factory killer (Coronation Street); Linda double-crosses Stuart (EastEnders); Breda is a serial killer (Hollyoaks)
Best Exit	Jane Cox (Lisa Dingle in Emmerdale)	Bhavna Limbachia (Rana Habeeb in Coronation Street); Bonnie Langford (Carmel Kazemi in EastEnders); Lauren McQueen (Lily McQueen in Hollyoaks)
Best Partnership	Dominic Brunt and Lucy Pargeter (Paddy Kirk and Chas Dingle in Emmerdale)	Danny Dyer and Kellie Bright (Mick and Linda Carter in EastEnders); Roger Griffiths and Kara-Leah Fernandes (Mitch and Bailey Baker in EastEnders); Emma Atkins and Michelle Hardwick (Charity Dingle and Vanessa Woodfield in Emmerdale)
Best Show-Stopper	Carla's Mental Health episode (Coronation Street)	The factory collapse (Coronation Street); Sean's story (EastEnders); Victoria's rape (Emmerdale)
Best Drama Star	Rosie Marcel (Jac Naylor in Holby City)	Amanda Mealing (Connie Beauchamp in Casualty); Michael Stevenson (Iain Dean in Casualty); David Ames (Dominic Copeland in Holby City)
Best Drama Storyline	Iain's depression (Casualty)	Duffy's dementia (Casualty); The Holby cyber attack (Holby City); Dom finds out Ange is his mother (Holby City)
Best Daytime Soap	Neighbours	Doctors; Home and Away
Best Daytime Star	Ryan Moloney (Toadfish Rebecchi in Neighbours)	Matthew Chambers (Daniel Granger in Doctors); Ray Meagher (Alf Stewart in Home and Away); Jodi Anasta (Elly Conway in Neighbours)

=== 2020s ===
==== 2020 ====
The longlist was announced on 14 September 2020. The winners were announced on 23 November 2020.

Category	Winner	Shortlisted	Longlisted
Best Soap	EastEnders	Coronation Street; Emmerdale; Hollyoaks	—N/a
Best Actor	Ian Bartholomew (Geoff Metcalfe, Coronation Street)	Max Bowden (Ben Mitchell, EastEnders); Jeff Hordley (Cain Dingle, Emmerdale); Ashley Taylor Dawson (Darren Osborne, Hollyoaks)	Rob Mallard (Daniel Osbourne, Coronation Street); Simon Gregson (Steve McDonald, Coronation Street); James Bye (Martin Fowler, EastEnders); Zack Morris (Keegan Butcher-Baker, EastEnders); Dominic Brunt (Paddy Kirk, Emmerdale); Mark Charnock (Marlon Dingle, Emmerdale); Imran Adams (Mitchell Deveraux, Hollyoaks); Nick Pickard (Tony Hutchinson, Hollyoaks)
Best Actress	Jessica Plummer (Chantelle Atkins, EastEnders)	Shelley King (Yasmeen Metcalfe, Coronation Street); Natalie J. Robb (Moira Dingle, Emmerdale); Jennifer Metcalfe (Mercedes McQueen, Hollyoaks)	Jane Danson (Leanne Battersby, Coronation Street); Sally Carman (Abi Franklin, Coronation Street); Kellie Bright (Linda Carter, EastEnders); Shona McGarty (Whitney Dean, EastEnders); Emma Atkins (Charity Dingle, Emmerdale); Lisa Riley (Mandy Dingle, Emmerdale); Jessica Fox (Nancy Osborne, Hollyoaks); Kéllé Bryan (Martine Deveraux, Hollyoaks)
Funniest Performance	Lorraine Stanley (Karen Taylor, EastEnders)	Maureen Lipman (Evelyn Plummer, Coronation Street); Lisa Riley (Mandy Dingle, Emmerdale); Jessamy Stoddart (Liberty Savage, Hollyoaks)	Patti Clare (Mary Taylor, Coronation Street); Ricky Champ (Stuart Highway, EastEnders); Dominic Brunt (Paddy Kirk, Emmerdale); Lysette Anthony (Marnie Nightingale, Hollyoaks)
Best Newcomer	Mollie Gallagher (Nina Lucas, Coronation Street)	Jaz Deol (Kheerat Panesar, EastEnders); Max Parker (Luke Posner, Emmerdale); Callum Kerr (PC George Kiss, Hollyoaks)	Adam Hussain (Aadi Alahan, Coronation Street); Jane Hazlegrove (Bernie Winter, Coronation Street); Clay Milner Russell (Bobby Beale, EastEnders); Milly Zero (Dotty Cotton, EastEnders); Michael Wildman (Al Chapman, Emmerdale); Reece Dinsdale (Paul Ashdale, Emmerdale); Andrea Ali (Celeste Faroe, Hollyoaks); Connor Calland (Jordan Price, Hollyoaks)
Best Villain	Ian Bartholomew (Geoff Metcalfe, Coronation Street)	Toby-Alexander Smith (Gray Atkins, EastEnders); Mark Womack (DI Mark Malone, Emmerdale); Bobby Gordon (Toby Faroe, Hollyoaks)	Mark Frost (Ray Crosby, Coronation Street); Mikey North (Gary Windass, Coronation Street); Balvinder Sopal (Suki Panesar, EastEnders); Tom Wells (Leo King, EastEnders); Claire King (Kim Tate, Emmerdale); Jonathan Wrather (Pierce Harris, Emmerdale); Joe McGann (Edward Hutchinson, Hollyoaks); Tamara Wall (Grace Black, Hollyoaks)
Best Partnership	Danny Dyer and Kellie Bright (Mick and Linda Carter, EastEnders)	Sam Aston and Dolly-Rose Campbell (Chesney Brown and Gemma Winter, Coronation Street); Dominic Brunt and Lucy Pargeter (Paddy Kirk and Chas Dingle, Emmerdale); Imran Adams and Ross Adams (Mitchell Deveraux and Scott Drinkwell, Hollyoaks)	Alison King and Chris Gascoyne (Carla Connor and Peter Barlow, Coronation Street); Max Bowden and Tony Clay (Ben Mitchell and Callum Highway, EastEnders); Bradley Johnson and Lisa Riley (Vinny Ashdale and Mandy Dingle, Emmerdale); Haeisha Mistry and Ellis Hollins (Yasmine Maalik and Tom Cunningham, Hollyoaks)
Best Family	Dingle family (Emmerdale)	Barlow-McDonald family (Coronation Street); Taylor family (EastEnders); McQueen family (Hollyoaks)	Bailey family (Coronation Street); Mitchell family (EastEnders); Sharma family (Emmerdale); Maalik family (Hollyoaks)
Feel-Good Moment	Walford celebrates Pride (EastEnders)	Gemma gives birth (Coronation Street); Chas gives birth (Emmerdale); Sienna gets her babies back (Hollyoaks)	Rita and Jenny reminisce for Episode 10,000 (Coronation Street); Tiffany and Keegan's wedding (EastEnders); Sam and Lydia's wedding (Emmerdale); Mitchell proposes to Scott (Hollyoaks)
Best Show-Stopper	Yasmeen fights back against Geoff (Coronation Street)	The 35th anniversary river disaster (EastEnders); Cain and Nate's showdown (Emmerdale); Tony's rescue and Breda's death (Hollyoaks)	Sinead's death (Coronation Street); Linda's drunken New Year (EastEnders); The lockdown episodes (Emmerdale); The tunnel collapse (Hollyoaks)
Best Drama Star	Cathy Shipton (Lisa "Duffy" Duffin, Casualty)	Derek Thompson (Charlie Fairhead, Casualty); Rosie Marcel (Jac Naylor, Holby City); Alex Walkinshaw (Adrian "Fletch" Fletcher, Holby City)	Amanda Mealing (Connie Beauchamp, Casualty); Shaheen Jafargholi (Marty Kirkby, Casualty); Kaye Wragg (Essie Harrison, Holby City); Nic Jackman (Cameron Dunn, Holby City)
Best Daytime Soap	Neighbours	Doctors; Home and Away	—N/a
Best Daytime Star	Stefan Dennis (Paul Robinson, Neighbours)	Bharti Patel (Ruhma Carter, Doctors); Ray Meagher (Alf Stewart, Home and Away)	Adrian Lewis Morgan (Jimmi Clay, Doctors); Dex Lee (Bear Sylvester, Doctors); Dido Miles (Emma Reid, Doctors); Ada Nicodemou (Leah Patterson-Baker, Home and Away); Rob Kipa-Williams (Ari Parata, Home and Away); Sam Frost (Jasmine Delaney, Home and Away); Alan Fletcher (Karl Kennedy, Neighbours); Georgie Stone (Mackenzie Hargreaves, Neighbours); Jackie Woodburne (Susan Kennedy, Neighbours)

==== 2021 ====
The longlist was announced on 28 September 2021. The winners were announced on 23 November 2021.

Category	Winner	Longlisted
Best Soap	Coronation Street	EastEnders; Emmerdale; Hollyoaks
Best Actress	Sally Carman (Abi Webster, Coronation Street)	Jennie McAlpine (Fiz Stape, Coronation Street); Mollie Gallagher (Nina Lucas, Coronation Street); Balvinder Sopal (Suki Panesar, EastEnders); Letitia Dean (Sharon Watts, EastEnders); Shona McGarty (Whitney Dean, EastEnders); Amy Walsh (Tracy Metcalfe, Emmerdale); Isobel Steele (Liv Flaherty, Emmerdale); Lisa Riley (Mandy Dingle, Emmerdale); Alex Fletcher (Diane Hutchinson, Hollyoaks); Anna Passey (Sienna Blake, Hollyoaks); Kéllé Bryan (Martine Deveraux, Hollyoaks)
Best Actor	David Neilson (Roy Cropper, Coronation Street)	Charlie De Melo (Imran Habeeb, Coronation Street); Simon Gregson (Steve McDonald, Coronation Street); Danny Dyer (Mick Carter, EastEnders); Jaz Deol (Kheerat Panesar, EastEnders); Stevie Basaula (Isaac Baptiste, EastEnders); Bradley Johnson (Vinny Dingle, Emmerdale); Jonny McPherson (Liam Cavanagh, Emmerdale); Nick Miles (Jimmy King, Emmerdale); Billy Price (Sid Sumner, Hollyoaks); Gary Lucy (Luke Morgan, Hollyoaks); Richard Blackwood (Felix Westwood, Hollyoaks)
Best Newcomer	Jude Riordan (Sam Blakeman, Coronation Street)	Harriet Bibby (Summer Spellman, Coronation Street); Tony Maudsley (George Shuttleworth, Coronation Street); Brian Conley (Tom "Rocky" Cotton, EastEnders); James Farrar (Zack Hudson, EastEnders); Zaraah Abrahams (Chelsea Fox, EastEnders); Kevin Mathurin (Charles Anderson, Emmerdale); Lawrence Robb (Mackenzie Boyd, Emmerdale); Paige Sandhu (Meena Jutla, Emmerdale); Ki Griffin (Ripley Lennox, Hollyoaks); Omar Malik (Shaq Qureshi, Hollyoaks); Rhiannon Clements (Summer Ranger, Hollyoaks)
Best Villain	Paige Sandhu (Meena Jutla, Emmerdale)	Mark Frost (Ray Crosby, Coronation Street); Maximus Evans (Corey Brent, Coronation Street); Will Mellor (Harvey Gaskell, Coronation Street); Balvinder Sopal (Suki Panesar, EastEnders); Simone Lahbib (Katy Lewis, EastEnders); Toby-Alexander Smith (Gray Atkins, EastEnders); Alexander Lincoln (Jamie Tate, Emmerdale); Reece Dinsdale (Paul Ashdale, Emmerdale); Jamie Lomas (Warren Fox, Hollyoaks); Rhiannon Clements (Summer Ranger, Hollyoaks); Robert Beck (Fergus Collins, Hollyoaks)
Funniest Performance	Maureen Lipman (Evelyn Plummer, Coronation Street)	Jimmi Harkishin (Dev Alahan, Coronation Street); Gwen Taylor (Vi Highway, EastEnders); Tameka Empson (Kim Fox, EastEnders); Lawrence Robb (Mackenzie Boyd, Emmerdale); Samantha Giles (Bernice Blackstock, Emmerdale); Kevin Mathurin (Charles Anderson, Emmerdale); Chelsee Healey (Goldie McQueen, Hollyoaks); Jorgie Porter (Theresa McQueen, Hollyoaks)
Best Family	The Dingles (Emmerdale)	The Alahans (Coronation Street); The Platts (Coronation Street); The Panesars (EastEnders); The Slaters (EastEnders); The Tates (Emmerdale); The Deverauxs (Hollyoaks); The McQueens (Hollyoaks)
Best Partnership	David Neilson and Mollie Gallagher (Nina Lucas and Roy Cropper, Coronation Street)	Jane Danson and Ben Price (Leanne Battersby and Nick Tilsley, Coronation Street); Jessie Wallace and Steve McFadden (Kat Slater and Phil Mitchell, EastEnders); Tanya Franks and Ricky Champ (Rainie and Stuart Highway, EastEnders); Isobel Steele and Bradley Johnson (Liv Flaherty and Vinny Dingle, Emmerdale); Nicola Wheeler and Nick Miles (Nicola and Jimmy King, Emmerdale); Anna Passey and Rhiannon Clements (Sienna Blake and Summer Ranger, Hollyoaks); Kéllé Bryan and Richard Blackwood (Martine Deveraux and Felix Westwood, Hollyoaks)
Best Show-Stopper	Nina and Seb's Hate Crime Horror (Coronation Street)	The 60th Anniversary: Save Our Street! (Coronation Street); Gray kills Kush (EastEnders); Mick faces his abuser Katy (EastEnders+ Jimmy's Barn Crash/Paul dies (Emmerdale); Meena kills Leanna (Emmerdale); Flash-Forward Conclusion/Ella stabs Jordan (Hollyoaks); Sid's death and return (Hollyoaks)
Feel-Good Moment	Ben and Callum's Wedding (EastEnders)	Carla and Peter marry, (Coronation Street); James and Danny kiss, Coronation Street); Bobby stops Dana from leaving, EastEnders); Emmerdale celebrates Pride, Emmerdale); Tracy gives birth, Emmerdale); Brooke tells their friends they identify as non-binary, Hollyoaks); Tom and Yasmine's wedding, Hollyoaks)
Best Drama Star	Rosie Marcel (Jac Naylor, Holby City)	Amanda Mealing (Connie Beauchamp, Casualty); Charles Venn (Jacob Masters, Casualty); Di Botcher (Jan Jenning, Casualty); George Rainsford (Ethan Hardy, Casualty); Guy Henry (Henrik Hanssen, Holby City); Jo Martin (Max McGerry, Holby City); Nic Jackman (Cameron Dunn, Holby City)
Best Daytime Soap	Neighbours	Doctors; Home and Away
Best Daytime Star	April Rose Pengilly (Chloe Brennan, Neighbours)	Charlotte Chimes (Nicolette Stone, Neighbours); Matt Wilson (Aaron Brennan, Neighbours); Takaya Honda (David Tanaka, Neighbours); Ada Nicodemou (Leah Patterson, Home and Away); Emily Weir (Mackenzie Booth, Home and Away); James Stewart (Justin Morgan, Home and Away); Patrick O'Connor (Dean Thompson, Home and Away); Bharti Patel (Ruhma Carter, Doctors); Chris Walker (Rob Hollins, Doctors); Jan Pearson (Karen Hollins, Doctors); Ross McLaren (Luca McIntyre, Doctors)

==== 2022 ====
The longlist was announced on 19 July 2022. The shortlist was revealed on 11 October 2022. The winners were announced on 17 October 2022.

Category	Winner	Shortlisted	Longlisted
Best Soap	EastEnders	Coronation Street; Emmerdale; Hollyoaks	—N/a
Best Actor	Mark Charnock (Marlon Dingle, Emmerdale)	David Neilson (Roy Cropper, Coronation Street); Max Bowden (Ben Mitchell, EastEnders); Gregory Finnegan (James Nightingale, Hollyoaks)	Michael Le Vell (Kevin Webster, Coronation Street); Mikey North (Gary Windass, Coronation Street); Danny Dyer (Mick Carter, EastEnders); Jaz Deol (Kheerat Panesar, EastEnders); Kevin Mathurin (Charles Anderson, Emmerdale); Jeff Hordley (Cain Dingle, Emmerdale); Richard Blackwood (Felix Westwood, Hollyoaks); James Sutton (John Paul McQueen, Hollyoaks)
Best Actress	Gillian Wright (Jean Slater, EastEnders)	Sally Carman (Abi Webster, Coronation Street); Sally Dexter (Faith Dingle, Emmerdale); Harvey Virdi (Misbah Maalik, Hollyoaks)	Georgia Taylor (Toyah Habeeb, Coronation Street); Millie Gibson (Kelly Neelan, Coronation Street); Lacey Turner (Stacey Slater, EastEnders); Zaraah Abrahams (Chelsea Atkins, EastEnders); Paige Sandhu (Meena Jutla, Emmerdale); Zoë Henry (Rhona Goskirk, Emmerdale); Jennifer Metcalfe (Mercedes McQueen, Hollyoaks); Stephanie Waring (Cindy Cunningham, Hollyoaks)
Best Comic Performance	Maureen Lipman (Evelyn Plummer, Coronation Street)	Tameka Empson (Kim Fox, EastEnders); Dominic Brunt (Paddy Kirk, Emmerdale); Chelsee Healey (Goldie McQueen, Hollyoaks)	Jimmi Harkishin (Dev Alahan, Coronation Street); Brian Conley (Tom "Rocky" Cotton, EastEnders); Lisa Riley (Mandy Dingle, Emmerdale); Jessamy Stoddart (Liberty Savage, Hollyoaks)
Best Newcomer	Heather Peace (Eve Unwin, EastEnders)	Paddy Bever (Max Turner, Coronation Street); Louise Jameson (Mary Goskirk, Emmerdale); Matthew James-Bailey (Ethan Williams, Hollyoaks)	Bill Fellows (Stu Carpenter, Coronation Street); Delroy Atkinson (Howie Danes, EastEnders); Martelle Edinborough (Suzy Merton, Emmerdale); Garcia Brown (Zoe Anderson, Hollyoaks)
Best Young Performer	Isabella Flanagan (Hope Stape, Coronation Street)	Lillia Turner (Lily Slater, EastEnders); Amelia Flanagan (April Windsor, Emmerdale); Jayden Fox (Bobby Costello, Hollyoaks)	Jude Riordan (Sam Blakeman, Coronation Street); Sonny Kendall (Tommy Moon, EastEnders); Gabrielle Dowling (Cathy Hope, Emmerdale); Charlie Behan (Charlie Dean, Hollyoaks)
Best Villain	Paige Sandhu (Meena Jutla, Emmerdale)	Maximus Evans (Corey Brent, Coronation Street); Charlie Brooks (Janine Butcher, EastEnders); Jamie Lomas (Warren Fox, Hollyoaks)	Rebecca Ryan (Lydia Chambers, Coronation Street); Toby-Alexander Smith (Gray Atkins, EastEnders); Michael Wildman (Al Chapman, Emmerdale); Glynis Barber (Norma Crow, Hollyoaks)
Best Double Act	Anna Passey and Kieron Richardson (Sienna Blake and Ste Hay, Hollyoaks)	David Neilson and Mollie Gallagher (Nina Lucas and Roy Cropper, Coronation Street); Gillian Wright and Lacey Turner (Jean and Stacey Slater, EastEnders); Dominic Brunt and Mark Charnock (Paddy Kirk and Marlon Dingle, Emmerdale)	Jamie Kenna and Alan Halsall (Phill Whittaker and Tyrone Dobbs, Coronation Street); James Bye and James Farrar (Martin Fowler and Zack Hudson, EastEnders); Jeff Hordley and Jonny McPherson (Cain Dingle and Liam Cavanagh, Emmerdale); Ijaz Rana and Nick Pickard (Imran Maalik and Tony Hutchinson, Hollyoaks)
Best Romance	Zoë Henry and Mark Charnock (Rhona Goskirk and Marlon Dingle, Emmerdale)	Sally Dynevor and Joe Duttine (Sally and Tim Metcalfe, Coronation Street); Lacey Turner and Jaz Deol (Stacey Slater and Kheerat Panesar, EastEnders); Jessica Fox and Ashley Taylor Dawson (Nancy and Darren Osborne, Hollyoaks)	Elle Mulvaney and Jack James Ryan (Amy Barlow and Jacob Hay, Coronation Street); Jessie Wallace and Steve McFadden (Kat Slater and Phil Mitchell, EastEnders); Isobel Steele and Bradley Johnson (Liv and Vinny Dingle, Emmerdale); Haiesha Mistry and Ellis Hollins (Yasmine and Tom Cunningham, Hollyoaks)
Best Family	The Platts (Coronation Street)	The Slaters (EastEnders); The Dingles (Emmerdale); The McQueens (Hollyoaks)	The Alahans (Coronation Street); The Panesars (EastEnders); The Sharmas (Emmerdale); The Chen-Williams (Hollyoaks)
Best Storyline	Marlon's stroke (Emmerdale)	Abi's battle for baby Alfie (Coronation Street); Jean's bipolar disorder (EastEnders); Misbah's historic rape (Hollyoaks)	Fiz's love dilemma (Coronation Street); Ben's rape (EastEnders); Meena's reign of terror (Emmerdale); John Paul's alcohol addiction (Hollyoaks)
Best Show-Stopper	Jean in Southend (EastEnders)	Sinkhole horror/Johnny drowns (Coronation Street); Marlon's stroke (Emmerdale); Luke's death in Mallorca (Hollyoaks)	Imran's shock death (Coronation Street); Walford's Royal Jubilee visit (EastEnders); Meena kidnaps Dawn and Billy (Emmerdale); Explosion at the Salon de Thé (Hollyoaks)
All Time Icon	Lacey Turner (Stacey Slater, EastEnders)		
Best Drama Star	Rosie Marcel (Jac Naylor, Holby City)	Elinor Lawless (Stevie Nash, Casualty); Jason Durr (David Hide, Casualty); Alex Walkinshaw (Adrian "Fletch" Fletcher, Holby City)	Kirsty Mitchell (Faith Cadogan, Casualty); Neet Mohan (Rash Masum, Casualty); Guy Henry (Henrik Hanssen, Holby City); Jo Martin (Max McGerry, Holby City)
Best Daytime Soap	Neighbours	Doctors; Home and Away	—N/a
Best Daytime Star	Stefan Dennis (Paul Robinson, Neighbours)	Sarah Moyle (Valerie Pitman, Doctors); Emily Symons (Marilyn Chambers, Home and Away); Benny Turland (Hendrix Greyson, Neighbours)	Chris Walker (Rob Hollins, Doctors); Dex Lee (Bear Sylvester, Doctors); Jan Pearson (Karen Hollins, Doctors; Emily Weir (Mackenzie Booth, Home and Away); Ethan Browne (Tane Parata, Home and Away); Shane Withington (John Palmer, Home and Away); Georgie Stone (Mackenzie Greyson, Neighbours); Rebekah Elmaloglou (Terese Willis, Neighbours)

==== 2023 ====
The longlist was announced on 4 July 2023. Winners announced in September 2023.

Category	Winner	Shortlisted	Longlisted
Best Soap	EastEnders	Coronation Street; Emmerdale; Hollyoaks	—N/a
Best Actress	Danielle Harold (Lola Pearce-Brown, EastEnders)	Charlotte Jordan (Daisy Midgeley, Coronation Street); Claire King (Kim Tate, Emmerdale); Nikki Sanderson (Maxine Minniver, Hollyoaks)	Elle Mulvaney (Amy Barlow, Coronation Street); Maureen Lipman (Evelyn Plummer, Coronation Street); Diane Parish (Denise Fox, EastEnders); Shona McGarty (Whitney Dean, EastEnders); Emma Atkins (Charity Dingle, Emmerdale); Louise Jameson (Mary Goskirk, Emmerdale); Jennifer Metcalfe (Mercedes McQueen, Hollyoaks); Lucy-Jo Hudson (Donna-Marie Quinn, Hollyoaks)
Best Actor	Jamie Borthwick (Jay Brown, EastEnders)	Ryan Prescott (Ryan Connor Coronation Street); Dominic Brunt (Paddy Kirk, Emmerdale); Jamie Lomas (Warren Fox, Hollyoaks)	David Neilson (Roy Cropper, Coronation Street); Peter Ash (Paul Foreman, Coronation Street); James Farrar (Zack Hudson, EastEnders); Perry Fenwick (Billy Mitchell, EastEnders); Jeff Hordley (Cain Dingle, Emmerdale); Kevin Mathurin (Charles Anderson, Emmerdale); Gregory Finnegan (James Nightingale, Hollyoaks); Richard Blackwood (Felix Westwood, Hollyoaks)
Best Villain	Todd Boyce (Stephen Reid, Coronation Street)	William Ellis (Theo Hawthorne, EastEnders); William Ash (Caleb Miligan, Emmerdale); Angus Castle-Doughty (Eric Foster, Hollyoaks)	Andrew Still (Justin Rutherford, Coronation Street); Aaron Thiara (Ravi Gulati, EastEnders); Jane Gurnett (Faye Helders, Emmerdale); Glynis Barber (Norma Crow, Hollyoaks)
Best Comic Performance	Maureen Lipman (Evelyn Plummer, Coronation Street)	Shane Richie (Alfie Moon, EastEnders); Samantha Giles (Bernice Blackstock, Emmerdale); Chelsee Healey (Goldie McQueen, Hollyoaks)	Patti Clare (Mary Taylor, Coronation Street); Bobby Brazier (Freddie Slater, EastEnders); Tony Audenshaw (Bob Hope, Emmerdale); Diane Langton (Nana McQueen, Hollyoaks)
Best Newcomer	Channique Sterling-Brown (Dee Dee Bailey, Coronation Street)	Bobby Brazier (Freddie Slater, EastEnders); Lewis Cope (Nicky Miligan, Emmerdale); Jon-Paul Bell (Beau Ramsey, Hollyoaks)	Jodie Prenger (Glenda Shuttleworth, Coronation Street); Harriet Thorpe (Elaine Peacock, EastEnders); Flo Wilson (Claudette Anderson, Emmerdale); Jemma Donovan (Rayne Royce, Hollyoaks)
Best Partnership	Dominic Brunt and Mark Charnock (Paddy Kirk and Marlon Dingle, Emmerdale)	David Neilson and Maureen Lipman (Roy Cropper and Evelyn Plummer, Coronation Street); Balvinder Sopal and Heather Peace (Suki Panesar and Eve Unwin, EastEnders); Anna Passey and Matthew James-Bailey (Sienna Blake and Ethan Williams, Hollyoaks)	Sally Dynevor and Joe Duttine (Sally and Tim Metcalfe, Coronation Street); Emma Barton and Perry Fenwick (Honey and Billy Mitchell, EastEnders); Kevin Mathurin and Rebecca Sarker (Charles Anderson and Manpreet Sharma, Emmerdale); Ruby O'Donnell and Niamh Blackshaw (Peri Lomax and Juliet Nightingale, Hollyoaks)
Best Young Performer	Isabella Brown (Lexi Pearce, EastEnders)	Jude Riordan (Sam Blakeman, Coronation Street); Alfie Clarke (Arthur Thomas, Emmerdale); Jayden Fox (Bobby Costello, Hollyoaks)	Isabella Flanagan (Hope Stape, Coronation Street); Lillia Turner (Lily Slater, EastEnders); Gabrielle Dowling (Cathy Hope, Emmerdale); Elà-May Demircan (Leah Barnes, Hollyoaks)
Best Family	The Dingles (Emmerdale)	The Platts (Coronation Street); The Trueman-Fox-Brannings (EastEnders); The McQueens (Hollyoaks)	The Winter-Browns (Coronation Street); The Mitchells (EastEnders); The Andersons (Emmerdale); The Maaliks (Hollyoaks)
Best Storyline	Loving and losing Lola (EastEnders)	Daisy's stalker/acid attack (Coronation Street); Paddy's suicidal thoughts (Emmerdale); Juliet's cancer battle (Hollyoaks)	Amy did not consent (Coronation Street); Whitney and Zack say goodbye to Peach (EastEnders); Caleb plots to destroy Kim (Emmerdale); Incel Eric targets Mason and Maxine (Hollyoaks)
Best Showstopper	Acid Attack (Coronation Street)	Cindy Beale - Back from the dead! (EastEnders); The Storm/50th anniversary (Emmerdale); Maxine's long walk home (Hollyoaks)	Gemma and Chesney's wedding (Coronation Street); Mick jumps off a cliff to save Linda and Janine (EastEnders); Marlon saves Paddy (Emmerdale); Silas' revenge/carnival horror (Hollyoaks)
Best Daytime Star	Chris Walker (Rob Hollins, Doctors)	Kia Pegg (Scarlett Kiernan, Doctors); Ada Nicodemou (Leah Patterson-Baker, Home and Away); Matt Evans (Theo Poulos, Home and Away)	Dex Lee (Bear Sylvester, Doctors); Jan Pearson (Karen Hollins, Doctors); Jacqui Purvis (Felicity Newman, Home and Away); James Stewart (Justin Morgan, Home and Away)
Best Drama Star	Nigel Harman (Max Cristie, Casualty)	Charles Venn (Jacob Masters), Casualty); Adam Thomas (Donte Charles, Waterloo Road); Kym Marsh (Nicky Walters, Waterloo Road)	Elinor Lawless (Stevie Nash, Casualty); Kirsty Mitchell (Faith Cadogan, Casualty); Adam Abbou (Danny Lewis, Waterloo Road); Angela Griffin (Kim Campbell, Waterloo Road)
Soap Superstar of the Year	Max Bowden (Ben Mitchell, Eastenders)	—N/a	—N/a
Outstanding Achievement	Nikki Sanderson (Maxine Minniver, Hollyoaks)	—N/a	—N/a

==== 2024 ====
The longlist was announced on 16 July 2024. Winners were announced in London in September 2024. A new award for Best Pet was introduced this year.

Category	Winner	Shortlisted	Longlisted
Best Soap	Coronation Street	EastEnders; Emmerdale; Hollyoaks	—N/a
Best Daytime Soap	Neighbours	Doctors; Home and Away	—N/a
Best Actress	Eden Taylor-Draper (Belle King, Emmerdale)	Channique Sterling-Brown (Dee-Dee Bailey, Coronation Street); Angela Wynter (Yolande Trueman, EastEnders); Kirsty-Leigh Porter (Leela Dexter, Hollyoaks)	Georgia Taylor (Toyah Battersby, Coronation Street); Samia Longchambon (Maria Connor, Coronation Street); Diane Parish (Denise Fox, EastEnders); Michelle Collins (Cindy Beale, EastEnders); Lucy Pargeter (Chas Dingle, Emmerdale); Zoë Henry (Rhona Goskirk, Emmerdale); Anna Passey (Sienna Blake, Hollyoaks); Nadine Mulkerrin (Cleo McQueen, Hollyoaks)
Best Actor	Peter Ash (Paul Foreman, Coronation Street)	Colin Salmon (George Knight, EastEnders); Jeff Hordley (Cain Dingle, Emmerdale); Kieron Richardson (Ste Hay, Hollyoaks)	Daniel Brocklebank (Billy Mayhew, Coronation Street); David Neilson (Roy Cropper, Coronation Street); Rudolph Walker (Patrick Trueman, EastEnders); Scott Maslen (Jack Branning, EastEnders); Kevin Mathurin (Charles Anderson, Emmerdale); Mark Charnock (Marlon Dingle, Emmerdale); Charlie Clapham (Freddie Roscoe, Hollyoaks); James Sutton (John Paul McQueen, Hollyoaks)
Best Villain	Navin Chowdhry (Nish Panesar, EastEnders)	Calum Lill (Joel Deering, Coronation Street); James Chase (Tom King, Emmerdale); Jamie Lomas (Warren Fox, Hollyoaks)	Luca Toolan (Mason Radcliffe, Coronation Street); Matt Di Angelo (Dean Wicks, EastEnders); Beth Cordingly (Ruby Fox-Miligan, Emmerdale); Tyler Conti (Abe Fielding, Hollyoaks)
Best Comic Performance	Maureen Lipman (Evelyn Plummer, Coronation Street)	Tameka Empson (Kim Fox, EastEnders); Lisa Riley (Mandy Dingle, Emmerdale); Jorgie Porter (Theresa McQueen, Hollyoaks)	Jack P. Shepherd (David Platt, Coronation Street); Laila Morse (Mo Harris, EastEnders); Laura Norton (Kerry Wyatt, Emmerdale); Jessamy Stoddart (Liberty Savage, Hollyoaks)
Best Newcomer	Isabelle Smith (Frankie Osborne, Hollyoaks)	Vicky Myers (DS Lisa Swain, Coronation Street); Sophie Khan Levy (Priya Nandra-Hart, EastEnders); Beth Cordingly (Ruby Fox-Miligan, Emmerdale)	Jack Carroll (Bobby Crawford, Coronation Street); Charlie Suff (Johnny Carter, EastEnders); Paula Lane (Ella Forster, Emmerdale); Iz Hesketh (Kitty Draper, Hollyoaks)
Best Partnership	Daniel Brocklebank and Peter Ash (Billy Mayhew and Paul Foreman, Coronation Street)	Balvinder Sopal and Heather Peace (Suki Panesar and Eve Unwin, EastEnders); Dominic Brunt and Mark Charnock (Paddy Dingle and Marlon Dingle, Emmerdale); Nathaniel Dass and Oscar Curtis (Dillon Ray and Lucas Hay, Hollyoaks)	Joe Duttine and Simon Gregson (Tim Metcalfe and Steve McDonald, Coronation Street); Colin Salmon and Harriet Thorpe (George Knight and Elaine Peacock, EastEnders); Emma Atkins and Lawrence Robb (Charity Dingle and Mackenzie Boyd, Emmerdale); Kirsty-Leigh Porter and Rory Douglas-Speed (Leela and Joel Dexter, Hollyoaks)
Best Young Performer	Charlie Wrenshall (Liam Connor, Coronation Street)	Ellie Dadd (Amy Mitchell, EastEnders); Amelia Flanagan (April Windsor, Emmerdale); Oscar Curtis (Lucas Hay, Hollyoaks)	Liam McCheyne (Dylan Wilson, Coronation Street); Jaden Ladega (Denzel Danes, EastEnders); Gabrielle Dowling (Cathy Hope, Emmerdale); Ava Webster (Ro Hutchinson, Hollyoaks)
Best Family	The Dingles (Emmerdale)	The Platts (Coronation Street); The Mitchells (EastEnders); The McQueens (Hollyoaks	The Winter-Browns (Coronation Street); The Fox-Trueman-Brannings (EastEnders); The Tate-Taylors of Home Farm (Emmerdale); The Osbornes (Hollyoaks)
Best Storyline	Paul's MND (Coronation Street)	The Six: Killer cover-up (EastEnders); Tom and Belle: Coercive control (Emmerdale); Sibling sexual abuse (Hollyoaks)	Lauren disappears and Roy is jailed (Coronation Street); George unlocks the truth of his childhood (EastEnders); Rhona's battle for baby Ivy (Emmerdale); Leela and Joel's baby loss (Hollyoaks)
Best Showstopper	The Six: Killer cover-up) (EastEnders)	Joel is Lauren's mystery boyfriend (Coronation Street); Cliffhanger: Mackenzie Boyd's choice (Emmerdale); Frankie Osborne is being abused by JJ Osborne (Hollyoaks)	Carla Connor and Peter Barlow say goodbye (Coronation Street); Honey Mitchell and Jay Brown run the London Marathon (EastEnders); Ella Forster's killer past revealed (Emmerdale); Car crash carnage (Hollyoaks)
Best Daytime Star	Ryan Moloney (Jarrod 'Toadfish' Rebecchi, Neighbours)	Kia Pegg (Scarlett Kiernan, Doctors); Ada Nicodemou (Leah Patterson, Home and Away)	Dex Lee (Bear Sylvester, Doctors); Elisabeth Dermot Walsh (Zara Carmichael, Doctors); Ian Midlane (Al Haskey, Doctors); Emily Weir (Mackenzie Booth, Home and Away); Ethan Browne (Tane Parata, Home and Away); James Stewart (Justin Morgan, Home and Away); Majella Davis (Krista Sinclair, Neighbours); Matt Wilson (Aaron Brennan, Neighbours); Rebekah Elmaloglou (Terese Willis, Neighbours)
Best Drama Star	Adam Thomas (Donte Charles, Waterloo Road)	Elinor Lawless (Stevie Nash, Casualty); Neet Mohan (Rash Masum, Casualty); Alicia Forde (Kelly-Jo Rafferty, Waterloo Road)	Milo Clarke (Theodore "Teddy" Gowan, Casualty); Sarah Seggari (Rida Amaan, Casualty); Angela Griffin (Kim Campbell, Waterloo Road); James Baxter (Joe Casey, Waterloo Road)
Best Pet	Piper the dog (Emmerdale)	Freddie the dog (Coronation Street); Tyson the dog (EastEnders)	David the dog (Coronation Street); Jasper the parrot (EastEnders); Ice the horse (Emmerdale)
Soap Superstar of the Year	Balvinder Sopal	—N/a	—N/a
Outstanding Achievement	The cast and crew of Doctors	—N/a	—N/a

==== 2025 ====
The longlist was announced on 8 July 2025. The shortlist was announced on 23 September, with the winners revealed a week later. This was the first ceremony since 2008 to not include BBC daytime soap Doctors, following its final episode airing in November 2024. The ceremony also honoured Australian soap Neighbours with an achievement award following its cancellation in 2025.

Category	Winner	Shortlisted	Longlisted
Best Soap	Coronation Street	EastEnders; Emmerdale; Hollyoaks	—N/a
Best Actress	Vicky Myers (Lisa Swain, Coronation Street)	Lacey Turner (Stacey Slater, EastEnders); Beth Cordingly (Ruby Miligan, Emmerdale); Isabelle Smith (Francine Osborne, Hollyoaks)	Cait Fitton (Lauren Bolton, Coronation Street); Sue Devaney (Debbie Webster, Coronation Street); Diane Parish (Denise Fox, EastEnders); Michelle Collins (Cindy Beale, EastEnders); Amy Walsh (Tracy Robinson, Emmerdale); Emma Atkins (Charity Dingle, Emmerdale); Jennifer Metcalfe (Mercedes McQueen, Hollyoaks); Nadine Mulkerrin (Cleo McQueen, Hollyoaks)
Best Actor	Steve McFadden (Phil Mitchell, EastEnders)	Jack P. Shepherd (David Platt, Coronation Street); Jeff Hordley (Cain Dingle, Emmerdale); Kieron Richardson (Ste Hay, Hollyoaks)	Gareth Pierce (Todd Grimshaw, Coronation Street); Jacob Roberts (Kit Green, Coronation Street; Paul Bradley (Nigel Bates, EastEnders); Scott Maslen (Jack Branning, EastEnders); Danny Miller (Aaron Dingle, Emmerdale); William Ash (Caleb Miligan, Emmerdale); Ashley Taylor Dawson (Darren Osborne, Hollyoaks); Rory Douglas-Speed (Joel Dexter, Hollyoaks)
Best Comic Performance	Jack P. Shepherd (David Platt, Coronation Street)	Patsy Palmer (Bianca Jackson, EastEnders); Michael Parr (Ross Barton, Emmerdale); Nicole Barber-Lane (Myra McQueen, Hollyoaks)	Jodie Prenger (Glenda Shuttleworth, Coronation Street); Tameka Empson (Kim Fox, EastEnders); Nicola Wheeler (Nicola King, Emmerdale); Jessamy Stoddart (Liberty Savage, Hollyoaks)
Best Villain	Navin Chowdhry (Nish Panesar, EastEnders)	Joe Layton (Mick Michaelis, Coronation Street); Oliver Farnworth (John Sugden, Emmerdale); Gemma Bissix (Clare Devine, Hollyoaks)	Claire Sweeney (Cassie Plummer, Coronation Street); Jonny Freeman (Reiss Colwell, EastEnders); Ned Porteous (Joe Tate, Emmerdale); Jeremy Sheffield (Jeremy Blake, Hollyoaks)
Best Young Performer	Amelia Flanagan (April Windsor, Emmerdale)	Ryan Mulvey (Brody Michaelis, Coronation Street); Lillia Turner (Lily Slater, EastEnders); Ava Webster (Ro Hutchinson, Hollyoaks)	Liam McCheyne (Dylan Wilson, Coronation Street); Sonny Kendall (Tommy Moon, EastEnders); Fred Kettle (Dylan Penders, Emmerdale); Dan Hough (Arlo Fielding, Hollyoaks)
Best Newcomer	Laura Doddington (Nicola Mitchell, EastEnders)	Ryan Mulvey (Brody Michaelis, Coronation Street); Bradley Riches (Lewis Barton, Emmerdale); Zak Sutcliffe (Bobby Costello, Hollyoaks)	Jonathan Howard (Carl Webster, Coronation Street); Alice Haig (Vicki Fowler, EastEnders); Shebz Miah (Kammy Hadiq, Emmerdale); Brandon Fellows (Tommy Odenkirk, Hollyoaks)
Best Exit	James Bye (Martin Fowler, EastEnders)	Colson Smith (Craig Tinker, Coronation Street); Natalie Ann Jamieson (Amy Wyatt, Emmerdale); Tyler Conti (Abe Fielding, Hollyoaks)	Charlotte Jordan (Daisy Midgeley, Coronation Street); Natalie Cassidy (Sonia Fowler, EastEnders); Roxy Shahidi (Leyla Harding, Emmerdale); Nikki Sanderson (Maxine Minniver, Hollyoaks)
Best Family	The Dingles (Emmerdale)	The Platts (Coronation Street); The Slaters (EastEnders); The Osbornes (Hollyoaks)	The Websters (Coronation Street); The Fox-Truemans (EastEnders); The Miligans (Emmerdale); The Blakes (Hollyoaks)
Best Partnership	Alison King and Vicky Myers (Carla Connor and Lisa Swain, Coronation Street)	Angela Wynter and Rudolph Walker (Yolande and Patrick Trueman, EastEnders); Danny Miller and Ryan Hawley (Aaron Dingle and Robert Sugden, Emmerdale); Harvey Virdi and Louis Emerick (Misbah Maalik and Donny Clark, Hollyoaks)	Sue Devaney and Vinta Morgan (Debbie Webster and Ronnie Bailey, Coronation Street); Diane Parish and Scott Maslen (Denise Fox and Jack Branning, EastEnders); Beth Cordingly and William Ash (Ruby and Caleb Miligan, Emmerdale); Gemma Bissix and Tamara Wall (Clare Devine and Grace Black, Hollyoaks)
Best Storyline	Mason's death & Abi's PTSD (Coronation Street)	Phil Mitchell: Hypermasculinity in crisis (EastEnders); John's hero complex (Emmerdale); Teenage sexual exploitation (Hollyoaks)	Debbie's dementia (Coronation Street); Who attacked Cindy? (EastEnders); Joe Tate's wicked fight for survival (Emmerdale); Cleo's abuse at the hands of Abe (Hollyoaks)
Best Showstopper	The limo crash disaster (Emmerdale)	Craig's death (Coronation Street); Nish and Suki's final showdown (EastEnders); Mercedes faces her cancer scars (Hollyoaks)	The Platt house explodes (Coronation Street); EastEnders at 40: Angie Watts returns (EastEnders); Robert crashes Aaron and John's wedding (Emmerdale); Clare Devine back from the dead (Hollyoaks)
Best Daytime Star	Stefan Dennis (Paul Robinson, Neighbours)	Ethan Browne (Tane Parata, Home and Away); Nicholas Cartwright (Cash Newman, Home and Away); Xavier Molyneux (Byron Stone, Neighbours)	Georgie Parker (Roo Stewart, Home and Away); Stephanie Panozzo (Eden Fowler, Home and Away); Annie Jones (Jane Harris, Neighbours); Lucinda Armstrong Hall (Holly Hoyland, Neighbours)
Best Drama Star	Michael Stevenson (Iain Dean, Casualty)	Barney Walsh (Cameron Mickelthwaite, Casualty); Jason Manford (Steve Savage, Waterloo Road); Zak Sutcliffe (Schuey Weever, Waterloo Road)	Anna Chell (Jodie Whyte, Casualty); Sarah Seggari (Rida Amaan, Casualty); Hattie Dynevor (Libby Guthrie, Waterloo Road); Summer Bird (Tonya Walters, Waterloo Road)
Soap Superstar	Heather Peace (Eve Panesar-Unwin, EastEnders)	—N/a	—N/a
Outstanding Achievement (Solo)	Nick Pickard (Tony Hutchinson, Hollyoaks)	—N/a	—N/a
Outstanding Achievement (Team)	The cast and crew of Neighbours	—N/a	—N/a

==== 2026 ====
The longlist was announced on 30 June 2026. For the first time since 2009, Australian soap Home and Away is nominated in all main categories.

Category	Winner	Shortlisted	Longlisted
Best Soap	TBA	TBA	Coronation Street; Eastenders; Emmerdale; Hollyoaks; Home and Away
Best Actress	Vicky Myers (Lisa Connor-Swain, Coronation Street)	Vicky Myers (Lisa Connor-Swain, Coronation Street) Diane Parish (Denise Fox, Eastenders) Emma Atkins (Charity Dingle, Emmerdale) Alex Fletcher (Diane Hutchinson, Hollyoaks) Emily Weir (Mackenzie Booth, Home and Away)	Sue Devaney (Debbie Webster Coronation Street); Vicky Myers (Lisa Connor-Swain, Coronation Street); Tina O'Brien (Sarah Platt, Coronation Street); Emma Barton (Honey Mitchell, Coronation Street); Karen Henthorn (Julie Bates, Eastenders); Diane Parish (Denise Fox, Eastenders); Emma Atkins (Charity Dingle, Emmerdale); Olivia Bromley (Dawn Fletcher, Emmerdale); Natalie J Robb (Moira Dingle, Emmerdale); Alex Fletcher (Diane Hutchinson, Hollyoaks); Nadine Mulkerrin (Cleo McQueen, Hollyoaks); Anna Passey (Sienna Blake, Hollyoaks); Ada Nicodemou (Leah Patterson, Home and Away); Sophea Pennington (Lacey Miller, Home and Away); Emily Weir (Mackenzie Booth, Home and Away)
Best Actor	Gareth Pierce (Todd Grimshaw, Coronation Street)	Gareth Pierce (Todd Grimshaw, Coronation Street) Paul Bradley (Nigel Bates, Eastenders) Jeff Hordley (Cain Dingle, Emmerdale) Danny Mac (Dodger Savage, Hollyoaks) Ethan Browne (Tane Parata, Home and Away)	Rob Mallard (Daniel Osborne, Coronation Street); Vinta Morgan (Ronnie Bailey, Coronation Street)
Best Comic Performance	Chriss Coghill (Kev Barton, Emmerdale)	Amy Robbins (Christina Boyd, Coronation Street) Pierre Counihan-Moullier (Oscar Branning, Eastenders) Chris Coghill (Kev Barton, Emmerdale) Nicole Barber-Lane (Myra McQueen, Hollyoaks) Shane Withington (John Palmer, Home and Away)	Amy Robbins (Christina Boyd, Coronation Street) Pierre Counihan-Moullier (Oscar Branning, Eastenders) Chris Coghill (Kev Barton, Emmerdale) Nicole Barber-Lane (Myra McQueen, Hollyoaks) Shane Withington (John Palmer, Home and Away)
Best Villan		James Cartwright (Theo Silverton, Coronation Street) Ronni Ancona (Bea Pollard, Eastenders) Joe Absolom (Ray Walters, Emmerdale) Anna Passey (Sienna Blake, Hollyoaks) Sara Wiseman (Kerrie Matheson, Home and Away)	James Cartwright (Theo Silverton, Coronation Street) Ronni Ancona (Bea Pollard, Eastenders) Joe Absolom (Ray Walters, Emmerdale) Anna Passey (Sienna Blake, Hollyoaks) Sara Wiseman (Kerrie Matheson, Home and Away)
Best Young Performer			
Best Newcomer	Chris Coghill (Kev Barton, Emmerdale)		
Best Exit	Daniel Brocklebank (Billy Mayhew, Coronation Street)		
Best Family	The Dingles (Emmerdale)	The Driscolls (Coronation Street) The Brannings (Eastenders) The Dingles (Emmerdale) The Hutchinsons (Hollyoaks) The Folwers (Home and Away)	
Best Partnership	Alison King & Vicky Myers (Carla & Lisa Connor-Swain, Coronation Street)		
Best Storyline			
Best Showstopper	Corriedale (Coronation Street & Emmerdale)		
Outstanding Achievement			

== Awards totals ==
Key:

– Best Soap award winner

Soap opera	2001	2002	2003	2004	2005	2006	2007	2008	2009	2010	2011	2012	2013	2014	2015	2016	2017	2018	2019	2020	2021	2022	2023	2024	2025	Total awards
Bad Girls	0	0	0	0	1	0	—N/a																			1
Brookside	1	1	—N/a																							2
Casualty	0	0	0	0	0	0	0	0	0	0	0	0	0	0	1	1	2	1	1	1	0	0	1	0	0	8
Coronation Street	4	4	4	6	6	6	5	3	5	4	3	3	4	3	3	4	5	8	3	4	7	3	4	6	5	112
Doctors	0	0	0	0	0	0	0	0	0	0	0	0	0	0	0	0	1	1	0	0	0	0	1	1	—N/a	4
EastEnders	8	7	8	7	7	6	5	9	7	6	5	7	4	4	3	5	2	2	4	5	1	5	6	2	5	130
Emmerdale	1	1	2	1	2	2	2	1	0	2	2	0	3	3	8	4	8	4	4	1	2	4	2	3	3	65
Family Affairs	0	0	0	0	0	—N/a																				0
Holby City	0	0	0	0	0	0	0	0	0	0	0	0	0	0	0	1	0	1	1	0	1	1	—N/a			5
Hollyoaks	0	0	0	0	1	1	1	1	1	0	2	3	1	3	1	2	1	1	3	0	0	1	1	1	1	26
Home and Away	0	0	0	0	0	0	0	0	0	0	1	0	2	1	0	0	0	1	0	0	0	0	0	0	0	5
Neighbours	1	0	0	0	0	0	0	0	0	2	1	1	0	1	2	2	0	0	2	2	2	2	0	2	2	22
Night and Day	0	0	0	—N/a																						0
The Bill	0	1	1	1	0	1	1	1	1	0	—N/a															7
Waterloo Road	—N/a							0	0	0	0	1	1	1	1	1	0	—N/a								5
Where the Heart Is	0	0	0	0	0	0	—N/a																			0
