= British Soap Award for Best Young Performer =

Annual British TV award

- Country: United Kingdom
- First award: 2004
- Final award: 2025
- Currently held by: Amelia Flanagan, Emmerdale (2025)

Highlights
- Most awards: Amelia Flanagan; Ellis Hollins; Eden Taylor-Draper (all 2)
- Most nominations: Ellis Hollins (5)

The British Soap Award for Best Young Performer is an award presented annually by the British Soap Awards. It was also been presented as Best Dramatic Performance from a Young Actor or Actress, Best Young Actor and Best Young Performance. First awarded in 2004, the accolade was voted for by a panel. However, solely in 2023, the public were able to vote for the winner. EastEnders won the award six times, the most wins for any soap. Emmerdale actress Amelia Flanagan was the final winner of the award.

== Awards and nominees ==
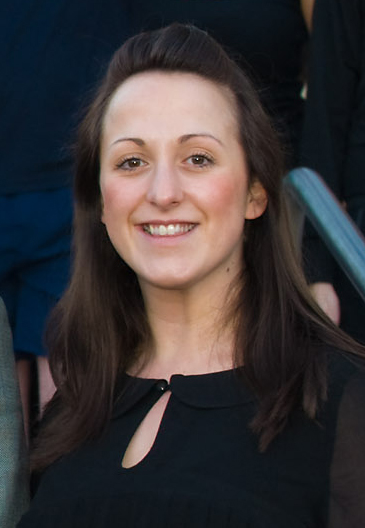
2004 winner Natalie Cassidy.

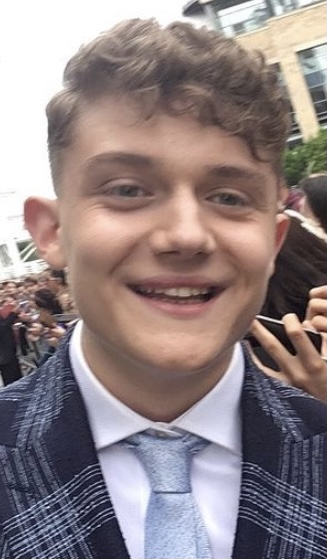
2006 and 2014 winner Ellis Hollins; he has a record five nominations.

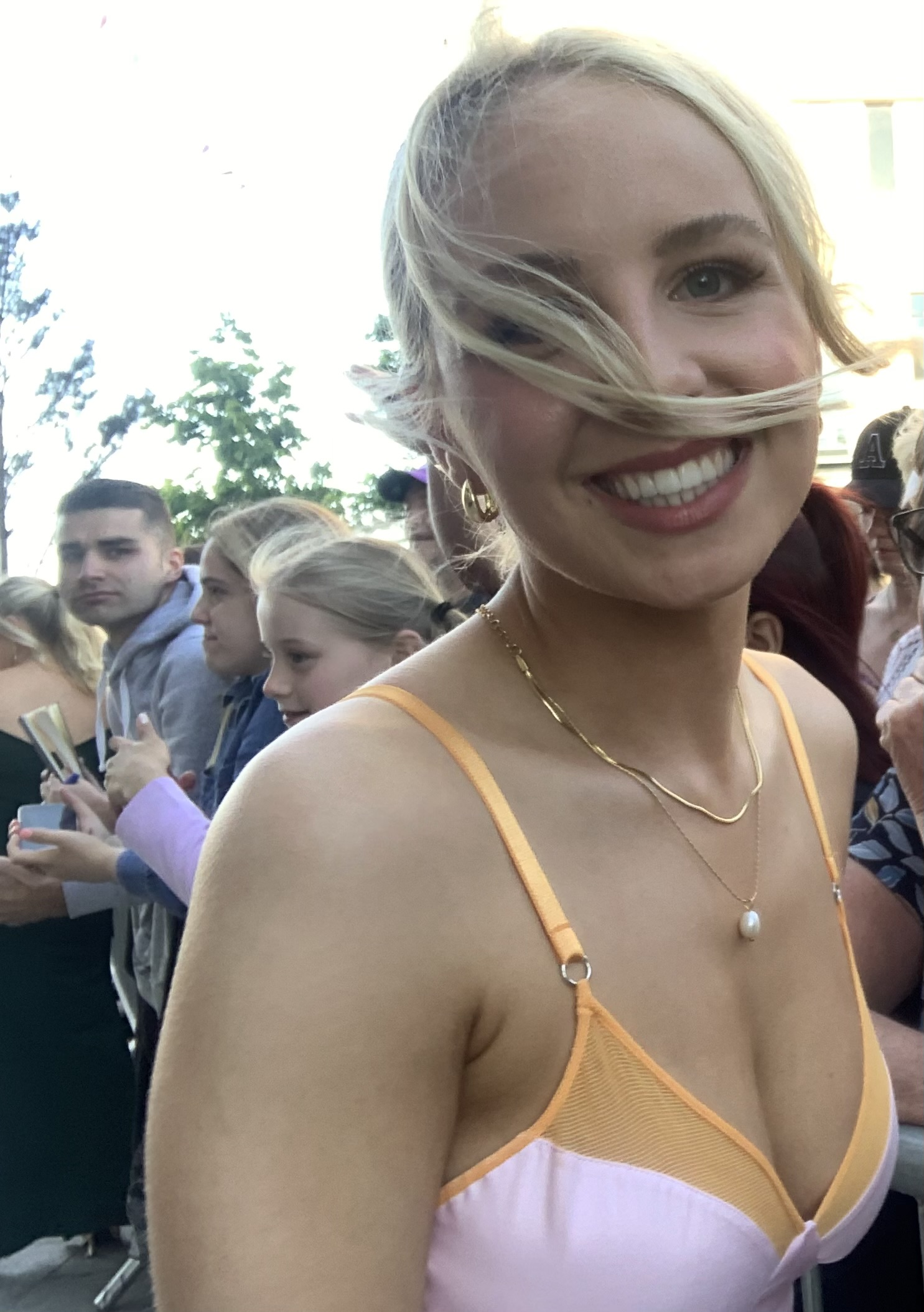
2007 and 2013 winner Eden Taylor-Draper.

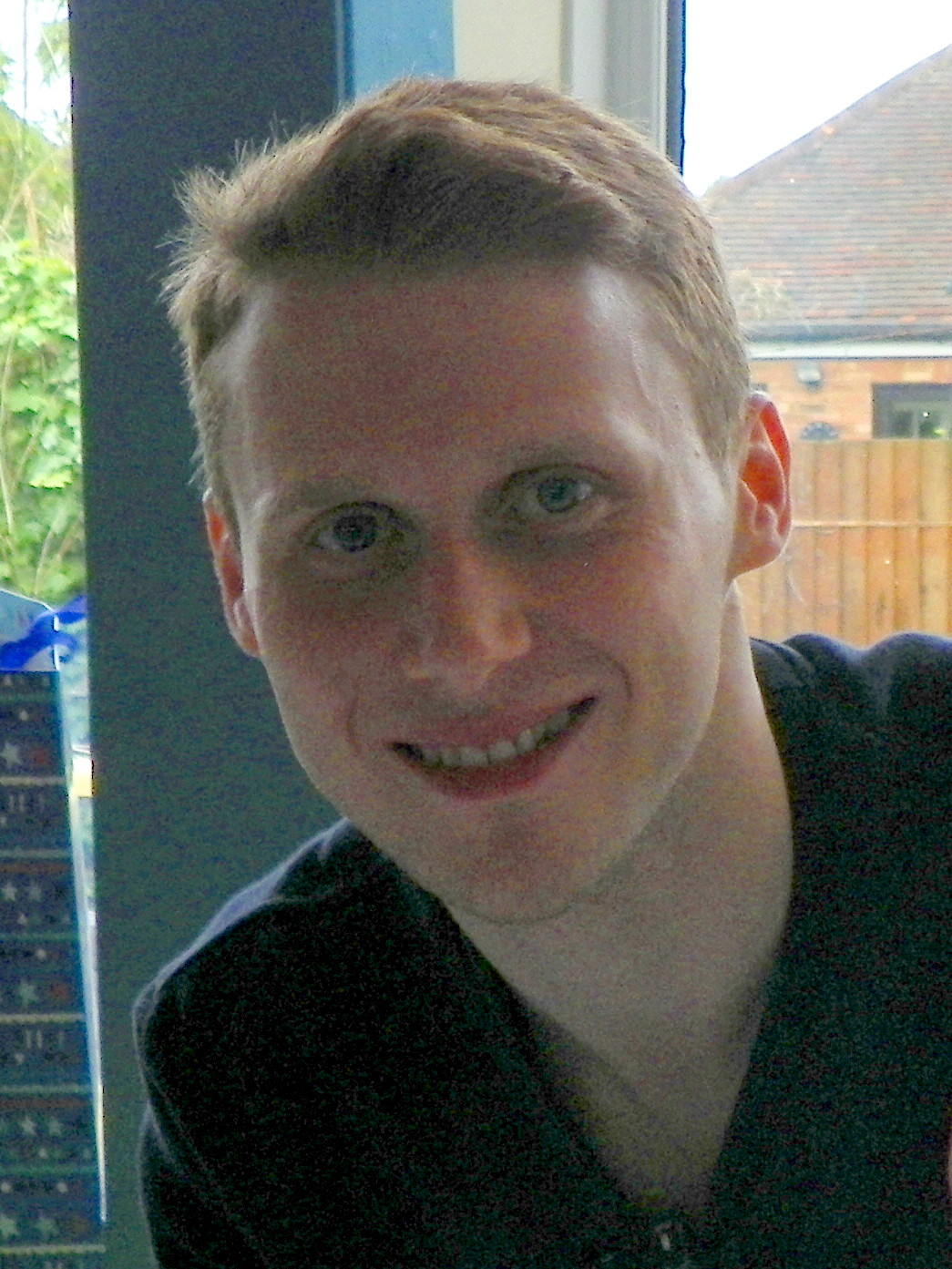
2008 winner Jamie Borthwick.

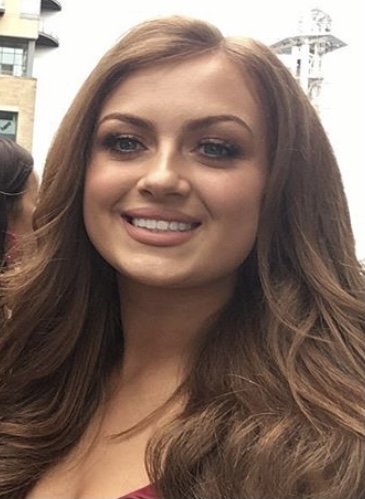
2009 winner Maisie Smith.

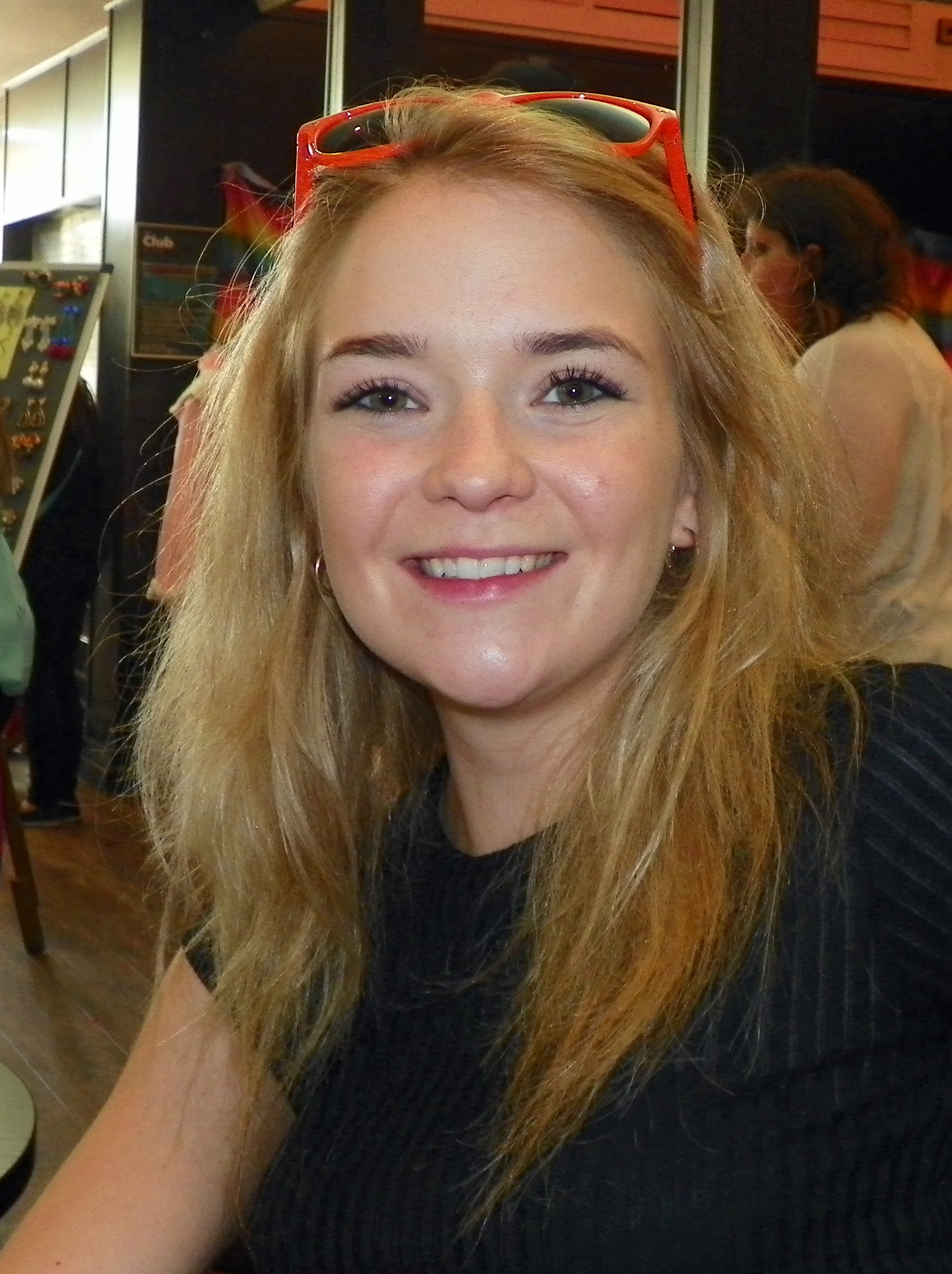
2012 winner Lorna Fitzgerald.

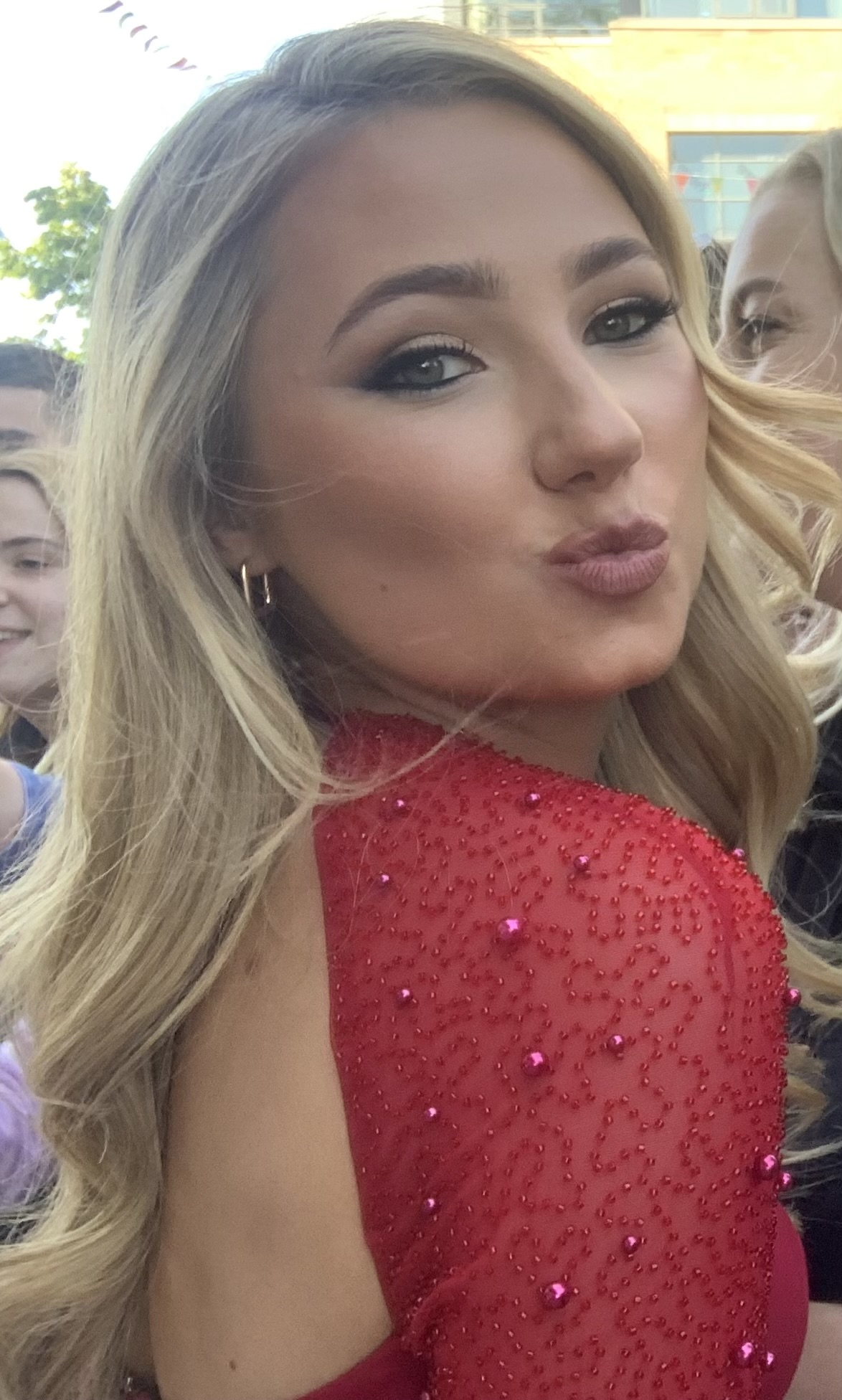
2016 winner Ruby O'Donnell.

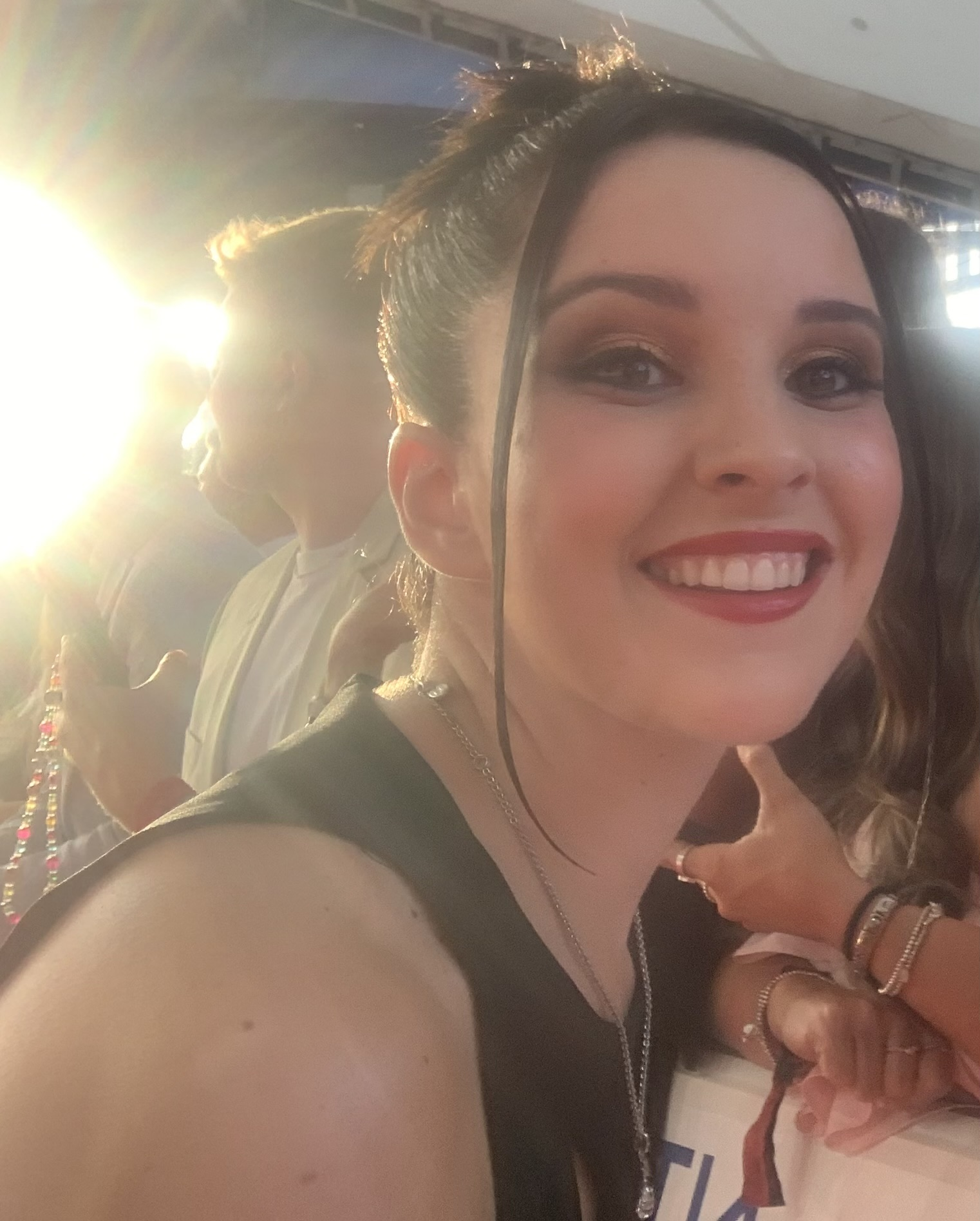
2017 winner Elle Mulvaney.

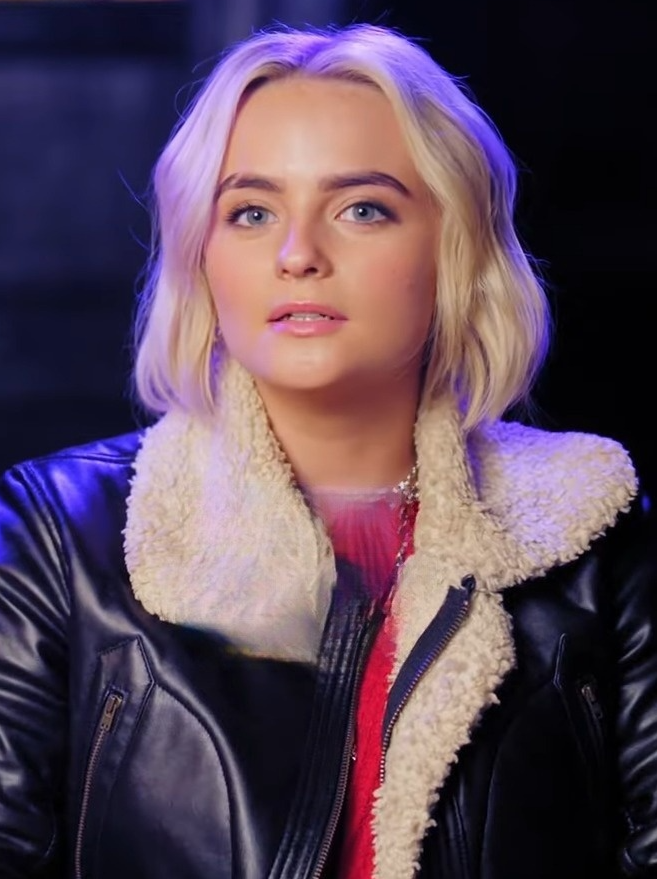
2022 winner Millie Gibson.

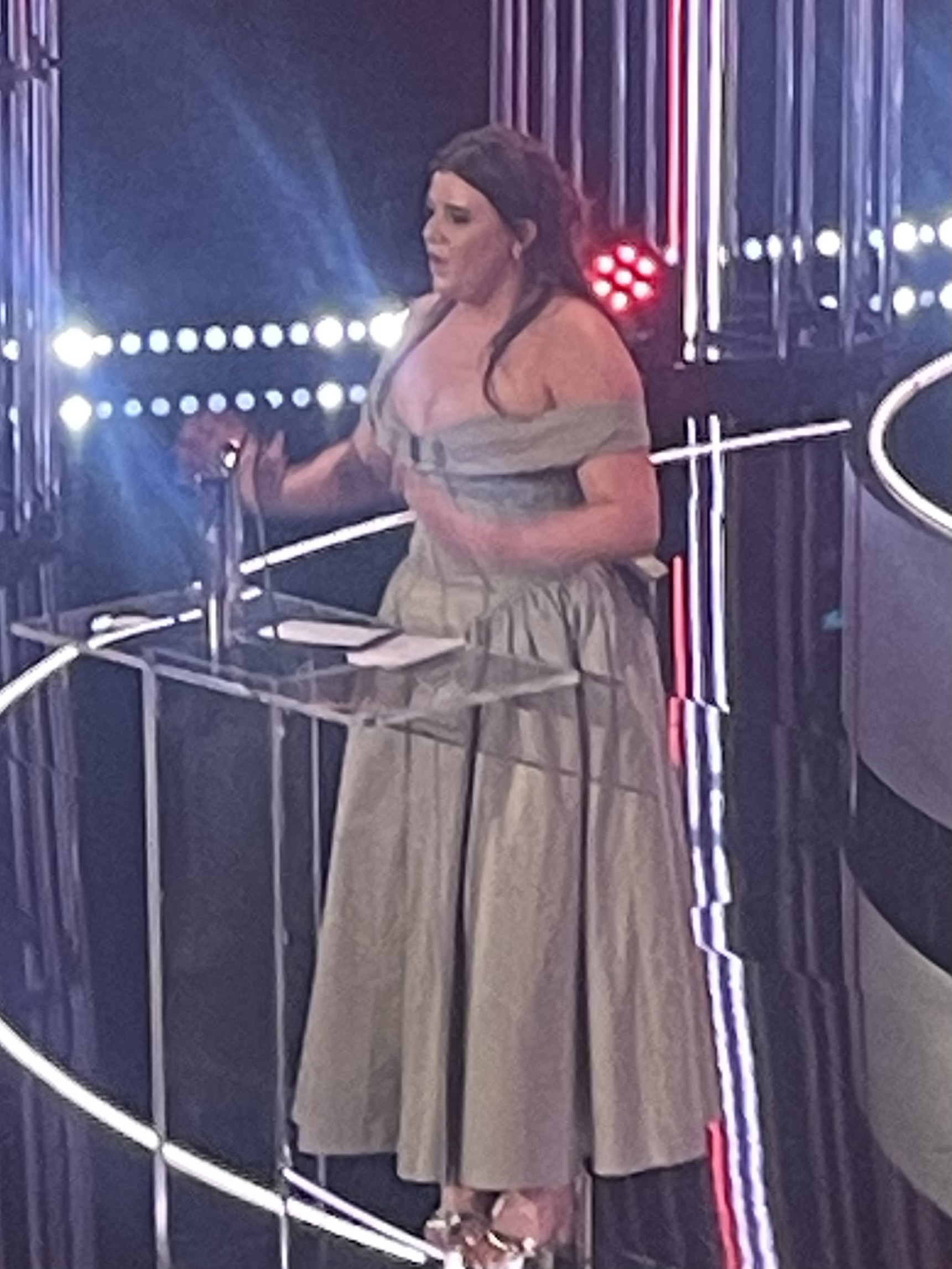
2023 winner Lillia Turner.

Year	Performer	Role	Soap opera
2004	Natalie Cassidy	Sonia Jackson	EastEnders
2004	Sam Aston	Chesney Brown	Coronation Street
2004	Luke Tittensor	Daz Eden	Emmerdale
2004	Gemma Atkinson	Lisa Hunter	Hollyoaks
2005	Sam Aston	Chesney Brown	Coronation Street
2005	Lacey Turner	Stacey Slater	EastEnders
2005	Charley Webb	Debbie Dingle	Emmerdale
2005	Chris Fountain	Justin Burton	Hollyoaks
2006	Ellis Hollins	Tom Cunningham	Hollyoaks
2006	Helen Flanagan	Rosie Webster	Coronation Street
2006	Richard Fleeshman	Craig Harris	Coronation Street
2006	Luke Tittensor	Daz Eden	Emmerdale
2007	Eden Taylor-Draper	Belle Dingle	Emmerdale
2007	Sam Aston	Chesney Battersby-Brown	Coronation Street
2007	Charlie G. Hawkins	Darren Miller	EastEnders
2007	Ellis Hollins	Tom Cunningham	Hollyoaks
2008	Jamie Borthwick	Jay Brown	EastEnders
2008	Brooke Vincent	Sophie Webster	Coronation Street
2008	Eden Taylor-Draper	Belle Dingle	Emmerdale
2008	Ellis Hollins	Tom Cunningham	Hollyoaks
2009	Maisie Smith	Tiffany Dean	EastEnders
2009	Alex Bain	Simon Barlow	Coronation Street
2009	Isabel Hodgins	Victoria Sugden	Emmerdale
2009	Ellis Hollins	Tom Cunningham	Hollyoaks
2010	Ami Metcalf	Sapphire Cox	Doctors
2010	Alex Bain	Simon Barlow	Coronation Street
2010	Maisie Smith	Tiffany Butcher	EastEnders
2010	Oscar Lloyd	Will Wylde	Emmerdale
2011	Alex Bain	Simon Barlow	Coronation Street
2011	Maisie Smith	Tiffany Butcher	EastEnders
2011	Eden Taylor-Draper	Belle Dingle	Emmerdale
2011	Ellis Hollins	Tom Cunningham	Hollyoaks
2012	Lorna Fitzgerald	Abi Branning	EastEnders
2012	Alex Bain	Simon Barlow	Coronation Street
2012	Charlie Kenyon	Cameron Waterhouse	Doctors
2012	Eden Taylor-Draper	Belle Dingle	Emmerdale
2013	Eden Taylor-Draper	Belle Dingle	Emmerdale
2013	Ellie Leach	Faye Windass	Coronation Street
2013	Maisie Smith	Tiffany Butcher	EastEnders
2013	Ellis Hollins	Tom Cunningham	Hollyoaks
2014	Ellis Hollins	Tom Cunningham	Hollyoaks
2014	Alex Bain	Simon Barlow	Coronation Street
2014	Oliver Woollford	Tom Finlayson	Doctors
2014	Mimi Keene	Cindy Williams	EastEnders
2014	Joe-Warren Plant	Jacob Gallagher	Emmerdale
2015	Amelia Flanagan	April Windsor	Emmerdale
2015	Ellie Leach	Faye Windass	Coronation Street
2015	Jack Carroll	Peter Harker	Doctors
2015	Eliot Carrington	Bobby Beale	EastEnders
2015	Ruby O'Donnell	Peri Lomax	Hollyoaks
2016	Ruby O'Donnell	Peri Lomax	Hollyoaks
2016	Elle Mulvaney	Amy Barlow	Coronation Street
2016	Grace	Janet Mitchell	EastEnders
2016	Amelia Flanagan	April Windsor	Emmerdale
2017	Elle Mulvaney	Amy Barlow	Coronation Street
2017	Bleu Landau	Dennis Rickman Jnr	EastEnders
2017	Isobel Steele	Liv Flaherty	Emmerdale
2017	Elà-May Demircan	Leah Barnes	Hollyoaks
2018	Isobel Steele	Liv Flaherty	Emmerdale
2018	Matilda Freeman	Summer Spellman	Coronation Street
2018	Maisie Smith	Tiffany Butcher	EastEnders
2018	Elà-May Demircan	Leah Barnes	Hollyoaks
2019	Kara-Leah Fernandes	Bailey Baker	EastEnders
2019	Elle Mulvaney	Amy Barlow	Coronation Street
2019	Oliver Falconer	Joe Granger Carmichael	Doctors
2019	Joe-Warren Plant	Jacob Gallagher	Emmerdale
2019	Lacey Findlow	Dee Dee Hutchinson	Hollyoaks
2022	Millie Gibson	Kelly Neelan	Coronation Street
2022	Sonny Kendall	Tommy Moon	EastEnders
2022	Amelia Flanagan	April Windsor	Emmerdale
2022	Jayden Fox	Bobby Costello	Hollyoaks
2023	Lillia Turner	Lily Slater	EastEnders
2023	Jude Riordan	Sam Blakeman	Coronation Street
2023	Huey Quinn	Kyle Winchester	Emmerdale
2023	Jayden Fox	Bobby Costello	Hollyoaks
2025	Amelia Flanagan	April Windsor	Emmerdale
2025	Will Flanagan	Joseph Winter-Brown	Coronation Street
2025	Sonny Kendall	Tommy Moon	EastEnders
2025	Noah Holdsworth	Oscar Osborne	Hollyoaks

== Achievements ==
=== Performers with multiple wins ===
Performer	Role	Soap opera	Wins	Nominations (Note: These nominations did not result in a win.)
Amelia Flanagan	April Windsor	Emmerdale	2	2
Ellis Hollins	Tom Cunningham	Hollyoaks	2	5
Eden Taylor-Draper	Belle Dingle	Emmerdale	2	3

=== Wins by soap ===
Soap opera	Wins	Nominations
EastEnders	6	12
Coronation Street	4	16
Emmerdale	5	14
Hollyoaks	3	14
Doctors	1	4
