= Sonny Kendall =

English actor

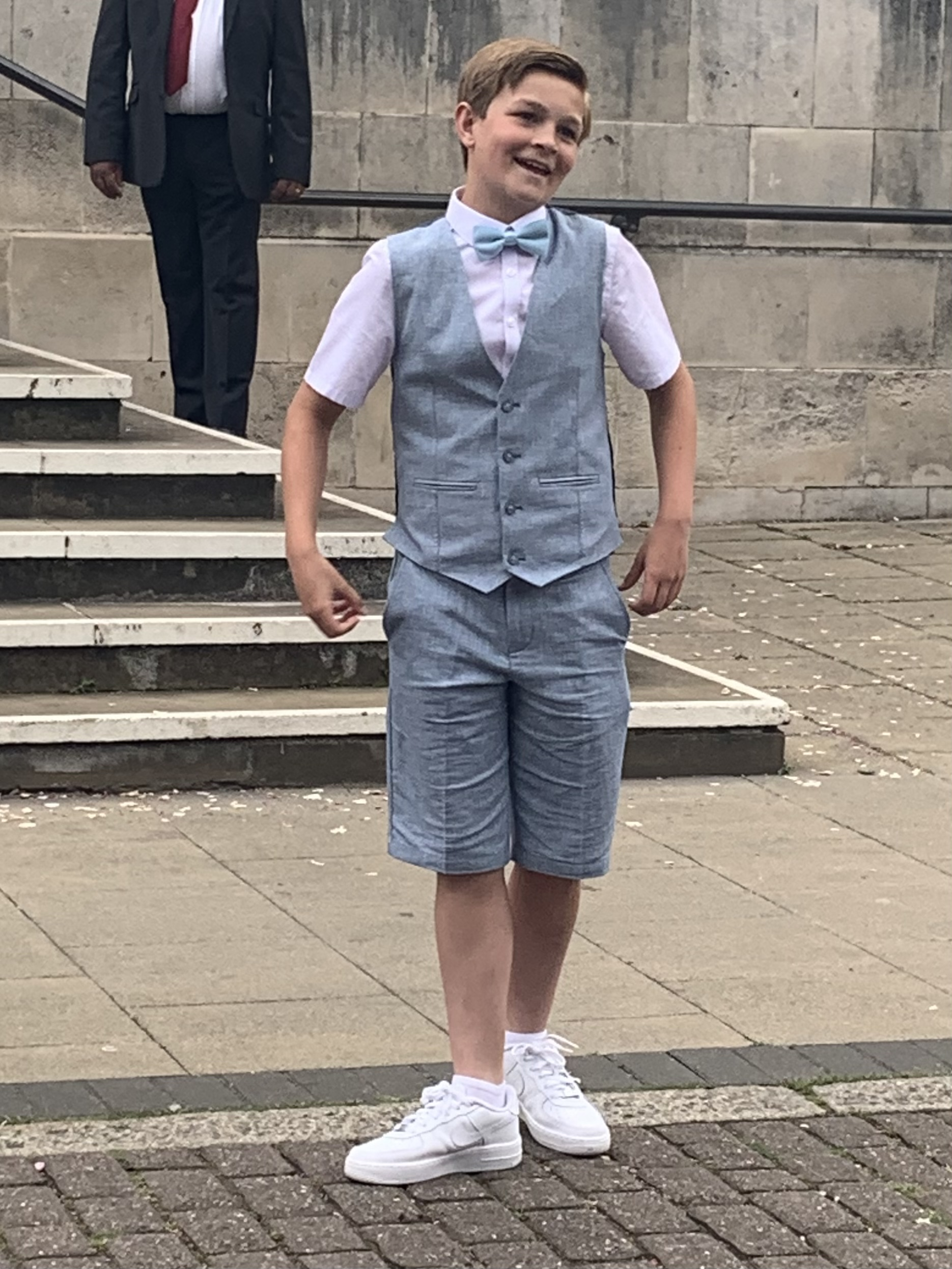
- Kendall in 2022
- Born: 13 January 2010 (age 16) (Note: Sonny and Ellie Dadd confirm his age as 15 in theTikTok comments section.); London, England UK
- Occupation: Actor
- Years active: 2021–present
- Television: EastEnders

Sonny Kendall (born 13 January 2010) is a British actor, known for his role as Tommy Moon in the BBC soap opera EastEnders. Since taking over the role in 2021, he has been nominated for Best Young Performer at the 2022 British Soap Awards.

== Career ==
In 2021, Kendall was cast in the BBC soap opera EastEnders. He was cast in the role of Tommy Moon, taking over from previous actor Shay Crotty. Since his introduction, Kendall's character has been involved in storylines including bullying, knife crime and parent abuse. For his portrayal of Tommy, Kendall has received award nominations including Best Young Performer at the 2022 British Soap Awards and Rising Star at the 27th National Television Awards.

== Filmography ==
Year	Title	Role	Notes
2021–present	EastEnders	Tommy Moon	Regular role

== Awards and nominations ==
Year	Ceremony	Category	Nominated work	Result	Ref.
2022	British Soap Awards	Best Young Performer	Tommy Moon (EastEnders)	Nominated	
2022	National Television Awards	Rising Star	Tommy Moon (EastEnders)	Nominated	
2022	Inside Soap Awards	Best Young Performer	Tommy Moon (EastEnders)	Nominated	
2022	TVTimes Awards	Favourite Young Performer	Tommy Moon (EastEnders)	Third	
2025	British Soap Awards	Best Young Performer	Tommy Moon (EastEnders)	Nominated	
2025	TVTimes Awards	Favourite Young Actor	Tommy Moon (EastEnders)	Pending	
