= Ellis Hollins =

English actor (born 1999)

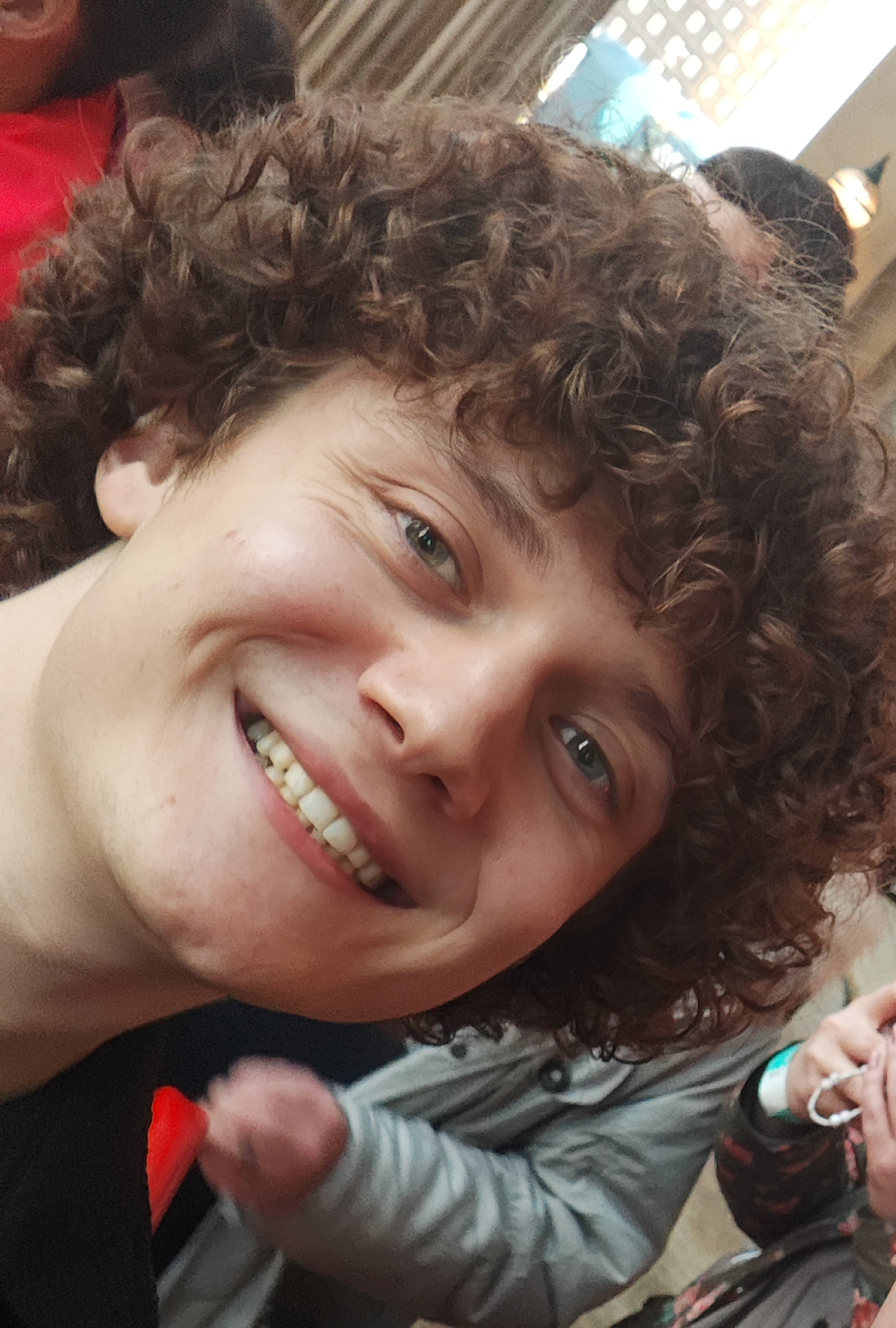
- Hollins in 2025
- Born: 14 November 1999 (age 26); Hollinwood, Oldham, England
- Occupation: Actor
- Years active: 1999–present
- Television: Hollyoaks

Ellis Hollins (born 14 November 1999) is an English actor. Aged three, he was cast as Tom Cunningham in the Channel 4 soap opera Hollyoaks. He portrayed the role from 2003 to 2025.

== Life and career ==
Hollins was born in Hollinwood, Oldham, on 14 November 1999. Aged 3, he was cast as Tom Cunningham in the Channel 4 soap opera Hollyoaks. Hollins was nominated for a British Soap Award in the Best Dramatic Performance from a Young Actor or Actress category in 2005, 2006, 2007, 2008, 2009 and 2011. He won the award in 2006. Hollins won Best Young Actor at the Inside Soap Awards in 2005, 2006 and 2008 and was nominated for the award in 2007, 2009, 2010 and 2011. In 2008, he won Best Child Actor at the inaugural Digital Spy Soap Awards. In 2009 in a poll for Inside Soap magazine, Hollins' Hollyoaks character, Tom, was voted 'Soap's Greatest Ever Youngster'. Hollins was also nominated for Best Young Actor at the 2012 Inside Soap Magazine awards.

In 2006, Hollins played the part of Nathan Lamis in the Dan Wilde production of Alpha Male. In 2012, he played the role of a young Hans Christian Andersen in the BBC Radio 4 drama The Beautiful Ugly. In 2024, it was announced that after 21 years, Hollins had been axed from Hollyoaks and would be departing from his role as Tom. He made his final appearance in 2025.

== Filmography ==
Year	Title	Role	Notes
2003–2025	Hollyoaks	Tom Cunningham	Regular role
2006	Alpha Male	Nathan Lamis	Film
2008	Hollyoaks Later	Tom Cunningham	Recurring role
2012	Little Crackers	Young Jason	Episode: "A Tender Christmas"
2014	Hollyoaks: Tom's Life	Tom Cunningham	Main role
2021	Powerless	Dan	Short film

== Awards and nominations ==
Year	Ceremony	Category	Nominated work	Result
2005	British Soap Awards	Best Dramatic Performance from a Young Actor or Actress	Hollyoaks	Nominated
2005	Inside Soap Awards	Best Young Actor	Hollyoaks	Won
2006	British Soap Awards	Best Dramatic Performance from a Young Actor or Actress	Hollyoaks	Won
2006	Inside Soap Awards	Best Young Actor	Hollyoaks	Won
2007	British Soap Awards	Best Dramatic Performance from a Young Actor or Actress	Hollyoaks	Nominated
2007	Inside Soap Awards	Best Young Actor	Hollyoaks	Nominated
2008	British Soap Awards	Best Dramatic Performance from a Young Actor or Actress	Hollyoaks	Nominated
2008	Inside Soap Awards	Best Young Actor	Hollyoaks	Won
2008	Digital Spy Soap Awards	Best Young Actor	Hollyoaks	Won
2009	Digital Spy Soap Awards	Best Young Actor	Hollyoaks	Won
2009	Inside Soap Awards	Best Young Actor	Hollyoaks	Nominated
2009	Inside Soap Award Poll	Soap's Greatest Child	Hollyoaks	Won
2010	Inside Soap Awards	Best Young Actor	Hollyoaks	Nominated
2011	British Soap Awards	Best Young Performance	Hollyoaks	Nominated
2011	Inside Soap Awards	Best Young Actor	Hollyoaks	Nominated
2012	British Soap Awards	Best Young Performance	Hollyoaks	Nominated
2012	Inside Soap Awards	Best Young Actor	Hollyoaks	Nominated
2013	British Soap Awards	Best Young Performance	Hollyoaks	Nominated
2013	Inside Soap Awards	Best Young Actor	Hollyoaks	Nominated
2014	British Soap Awards	Best Young Performance	Hollyoaks	Won
