= Isobel Steele =

English actress (born 2000)

- Born: Isobel Victoria Steele; 28 December 2000 (age 25); Salford, Greater Manchester, England
- Education: Philips High School
- Occupations: Actress; singer
- Years active: 2008–present

Isobel Victoria Steele (born 28 December 2000) is an English actress and singer. She is known for her role as Liv Flaherty in the ITV soap opera Emmerdale from February 2016 to October 2022, for which she was nominated for and won various awards, including a nomination for the British Soap Award for Best Newcomer in 2016, and winning the Best Young Actor award at both the British Soap Awards and the Inside Soap Awards.

== Career ==
Between 2008 and 2010, Steele appeared in commercials for Park Foods, Iceland, Harveys Furniture and Bernard Matthews Ltd. For BBC Learning in 2013, she played Nicky in Lost. Steele appeared in Our Zoo in 2014 as Barbara. She also played Chloe in a short film, A Father's Day. Steele appeared in episode of The Dumping Ground in series 4 playing Kara. In 2016, Steele was cast as Liv Flaherty in Emmerdale, the half-sister of Aaron Dingle (Danny Miller). She took a break from the show in 2017 to sit her GCSE exams. Steele also began posting original and cover songs on her YouTube channel in 2017. In November 2019, Steele released an extended play, Sounds from the Lounge. In October 2022, it was announced that Steele had made the decision to leave Emmerdale to focus on her music career. She released the single "Out for Breakfast" in April 2023. She now makes music under the name "Little Dog Star".

== Filmography ==
| Year | Title | Role | Notes |
|---|---|---|---|
| 2014 | Our Zoo | Barbara | 1 episode |
| 2016 | A Father's Day | Chloe | Short film |
| 2016 | The Dumping Ground | Kara | Episode: "Getting to Know You" |
| 2016–2022 | Emmerdale | Liv Flaherty | Regular role |

== Discography ==
=== Extended plays ===
List of extended plays, with selected details
| Title | Details |
|---|---|
| Sounds from the Lounge | Released: 1 November 2019; Format: Digital download, streaming |

=== Singles ===
List of singles, showing year released and album name
| Title | Year | Album |
|---|---|---|
| "In Your Case" | 2019 | Non-album single |
| "Out for Breakfast" | 2023 | TBA |
| "The Book that I've Been Reading" | 2023 | TBA |

== Awards and nominations ==
| Year | Award | Category | Result | Ref. |
|---|---|---|---|---|
| 2016 | British Soap Awards | Best Newcomer | Nominated | |
| 2016 | TV Choice Awards | Best Soap Newcomer | Nominated | |
| 2016 | Inside Soap Awards | Best Newcomer | Nominated | |
| 2016 | TVTimes Award | Best Newcomer | Won | |
| 2017 | British Soap Awards | Best Young Actor | Nominated | |
| 2018 | British Soap Awards | Best Young Actor | Won | |
| 2018 | Inside Soap Awards | Best Young Actor | Won | |
| 2021 | 26th National Television Awards | Serial Drama Performance | Nominated | |
| 2021 | TV Choice Awards | Best Soap Actress | Shortlisted | |
| 2021 | Inside Soap Awards | Best Actress | Nominated | |
| 2021 | Inside Soap Awards | Best Partnership (alongside Bradley Johnson) | Nominated | |
| 2022 | British Soap Awards | Best On-Screen Partnership (alongside Bradley Johnson) | Nominated | |
| 2022 | Inside Soap Awards | Best Romance (alongside Bradley Johnson) | Nominated | |
