= Eden Taylor-Draper =

English actress (b. 1997)

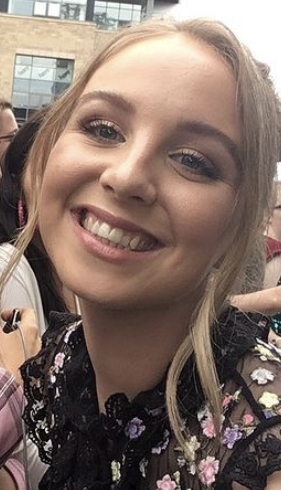
- Taylor-Draper in 2023
- Born: Eden Elenor Taylor-Draper; 28 October 1997 (age 28); Selby, North Yorkshire, England
- Occupation: Actress
- Years active: 2005–present
- Height: 5 ft 4 in (1.63 m)
- Partner: Ed Lewis

Eden Elenor Taylor-Draper (born 28 October 1997) is an English actress. She portrays Belle Dingle in the ITV soap opera Emmerdale, a role she took over from Emily Mather in 2005.

== Career ==
In 2005, at the age of eight, Taylor-Draper was cast in the role of Belle Dingle in the ITV soap opera Emmerdale, taking over from the previous portrayer, Emily Mather. One of Taylor-Draper's notable storylines in Emmerdale was when Belle fell down a mineshaft on Christmas Day 2005. Alongside Luke Tittensor, she won the Spectacular Scene of the Year award at the 2006 British Soap Awards for this storyline. In 2007, at the age of nine, she appeared in the short film The Cardiac Oak. In 2013, she won the award for Best Young Performance at the British Soap Awards.

== Personal life ==
On 11 September 2016, alongside her Emmerdale co-star Matthew Wolfenden, Taylor-Draper took part in the Great North Run to raise funds for Bloodwise. Since 2016, she has been in a relationship with Ed Lewis.

== Filmography ==
| Year | Title | Role | Notes |
|---|---|---|---|
| 2005–present | Emmerdale | Belle Dingle | Regular role |
| 2009 | The Cardiac Oak | | Short film |
| 2010 | Emmerdale: The Dingles - For Richer or Poorer | Belle Dingle | Special |
| 2011 | Emmerdale: Paddy and Marlon's Big Night In | Belle Dingle | Special |

== Awards and nominations ==
| Year | Award | Category | Result | Ref. |
|---|---|---|---|---|
| 2006 | Inside Soap Awards | Best Young Actor | Nominated | |
| 2007 | British Soap Awards | Best Dramatic Performance from a Young Actor or Actress | Won | |
| 2007 | Inside Soap Awards | Best Young Actor | Won | |
| 2007 | Yorkshire Young Achievers Awards | Personality of the Year | Won | |
| 2008 | British Soap Awards | Best Dramatic Performance from a Young Actor or Actress | Nominated | |
| 2008 | Inside Soap Awards | Best Young Actress | Nominated | |
| 2013 | British Soap Awards | Best Young Performance | Won | |
| 2024 | TVTimes Awards | Favourite Soap Performer | Nominated | |
| 2024 | National Television Awards | Serial Drama Performance | Nominated | |
| 2024 | Inside Soap Awards | Best Actress | Won | |
| 2024 | I Talk Telly Awards | Best Soap Performance | Nominated | |
| 2025 | TV Choice Awards | Best Soap Performance | Nominated | |
| 2025 | British Soap Awards | Best Dramatic Performance | Nominated | |
| 2025 | British Soap Awards | Best Leading Performer | Nominated | |
