= Sam Aston =

English actor (born 1993)

- Born: Samuel David Aston; 7 June 1993 (age 33); Bacup, England
- Education: Haslingden High School
- Occupation: Actor
- Years active: 2001–present
- Spouse: Briony Gardner (m. 2019)
- Children: 3
- Awards: National TV Awards Best Newcomer; 2004 Coronation Street – Chesney Brown; British Soap Awards – Chesney Brown; Best Dramatic Performance from a Young Actor or Actress at the British Soap Awards 2005 – Coronation Street

Samuel David Aston (born 7 June 1993) is an English actor, who has played Chesney Brown on the ITV soap opera Coronation Street since 2003.

== Career ==
Aston made his television debut at the age of five, as an extra in Eddie Mountain. He also appeared in Where the Heart Is and The Bill. In 2003, he was cast in the role of Chesney Brown on the ITV soap opera Coronation Street after four auditions.

In 2004, Aston was awarded Best Newcomer at the National Television Awards. The following year, Aston won Best Dramatic Performance from a Young Actor or Actress at the British Soap Awards. In October 2005, Aston presented the Queen with a bouquet at a party to celebrate fifty years of ITV. He appeared as Horrid Henry in the Children's Party at the Palace, an event to celebrate the 80th birthday of Queen Elizabeth II in June 2006. Aston has also appeared on All Star Family Fortunes with his family. In 2025, Aston won the seventeenth series of Dancing on Ice.

== Personal life ==
Aston has five sisters and three brothers. He is the younger brother of actress Emily Aston, who played Becky Palmer in Coronation Street from 1996 to 1997.

In 2017, Aston became engaged to yoga teacher Briony Gardner. He proposed to her in front of 250 spectators at an annual charity golf dinner, that he hosts with co stars Andy Whyment and Alan Halsall, at the Worsley Park Marriott Hotel in Salford. In May 2020, they announced that they were expecting their first child. In October 2021, they announced that they were expecting their second child. In November 2023, they announced that they were expecting their third child.
