= Amelia Flanagan =

English actress

- Born: 6 June 2008 (age 17); Leeds, West Yorkshire, England
- Occupation: Actress
- Years active: 2014–present
- Television: Emmerdale

Amelia Flanagan (born 6 June 2008) is an English actress who has appeared as April Windsor in the ITV soap opera Emmerdale since 2014.

== Early and personal life ==
Flanagan was born in Leeds, West Yorkshire, to parents Rachel and Chris Flanagan. Her younger twin siblings, Isabella and William, have been playing the roles of cousins Hope Stape and Joseph Brown in Coronation Street since 2017.

== Awards and nominations ==
Year	Award	Category	Work	Result	Ref(s)
2014	Inside Soap Awards	Best Young Actor	Emmerdale	Won	
2015	The British Soap Awards	Best Young Performance	Emmerdale	Won	
2015	Inside Soap Awards	Best Young Actor	Emmerdale	Won	
2016	The British Soap Awards	Best Young Performance	Emmerdale	Nominated	
2016	Inside Soap Awards	Best Young Actor	Emmerdale	Won	
2017	Yorkshire Choice Awards	Young Achiever of the Year	Emmerdale	Nominated	
2017	Inside Soap Awards	Best Young Actor	Emmerdale	Nominated	
2022	The British Soap Awards	Best Young Performer	Emmerdale	Nominated	
