= RadioTimes.com Soap Awards =

British soap opera awards ceremony

- Awarded for: Best in British soap opera
- Location: Midland Hotel, Manchester
- Country: United Kingdom
- Presented by: Brian Conley (2024)
- First award: 2024; 2 years ago
- Website: www.radiotimes.com/radiotimes-com-soap-awards-2024/

The RadioTimes.com Soap Awards is an awards ceremony in the United Kingdom hosted by magazine Radio Times. It honours soap operas and their cast members. Since 2024, the majority of the awards are voted for by a panel of industry professionals, while certain awards including Best Soap and Best Actor are voted for by the general public.

== Background ==
On 1 November 2023, it was announced that for only the third time in their 24-year history, The British Soap Awards would not be taking place in 2024, (twice previously due to the COVID-19 pandemic).

A month later, the inaugural RadioTimes Soap Awards were launched, despite having been previously awarded in 2020, also in response to the cancellation of that year's British Soap Awards.The 2024 award categories precisely mirrored those of the postponed British Soap Awards, but resurrected the Best Exit Award which was last conferred by the latter in 2013.

== Winners ==
=== 2020 ===
In response to the cancellation of the British Soap Awards due to the COVID-19 pandemic, Radio Times launched its own soap awards in May of this year. It consisted of just five categories, all of which were decided by public poll and awarded online as in-person ceremonies were largely prohibited. Australian soap opera Neighbours took all five awards when the results were announced in June of that year.

| Award | Winners | Nominees |
|---|---|---|
| Best Soap | Neighbours | Coronation Street; EastEnders; Emmerdale; Hollyoaks; Home and Away |
| Best Actor | Rob Mills (Finn Kelly in Neighbours) | Ian Bartholomew (Geoff Metcalfe in Coronation Street); Max Bowden (Ben Mitchell in EastEnders); Jeff Hordley (Cain Dingle in Emmerdale); Gregory Finnegan (James Nightingale in Hollyoaks); Ray Meagher (Alf Stewart in Home and Away) |
| Best Actress | Jackie Woodburne (Susan Kennedy in Neighbours) | Shelley King (Yasmeen Nazir in Coronation Street); Letitia Dean (Sharon Watts in EastEnders); Michelle Hardwick (Vanessa Woodfield in Emmerdale); Anna Passey (Sienna Blake in Hollyoaks); Lynne McGranger (Irene Roberts in Home and Away) |
| Best Newcomer | Jemma Donovan (Harlow Robinson in Neighbours) | Mollie Gallagher (Nina Lucas in Coronation Street); Milly Zero (Dotty Cotton in EastEnders); Mark Womack (DI Mark Malone in Emmerdale); Joe McGann (Edward Hutchinson in Hollyoaks); Kawakawa Fox-Reo (Nikau Parata in Home and Away) |
| Best Storyline | Finn Kelly's Revenge (Neighbours) | Coercive control (Coronation Street); Boat disaster (EastEnders); Who killed Graham Foster? (Emmerdale); Ste Hay's radicalisation (Hollyoaks); Hospital siege (Home and Away) |

=== 2024 ===
The ceremony took place on 13 July 2024 at the Midland Hotel in Manchester and was hosted by comedian Brian Conley. EastEnders dominated this year's ceremony with wins in seven out of the thirteen categories. Chris Chittell was honoured with the Special Recognition Award for his forty continuous years of portraying Eric Pollard in Emmerdale.

Legend:

– Decided by Public Vote

| Award | Winners | Nominees |
|---|---|---|
| Best Soap | EastEnders | Coronation Street; Emmerdale; Hollyoaks |
| Best Comedy Performance | Lisa Riley (Mandy Dingle in Emmerdale) | Jodie Prenger (Glenda Shuttleworth in Coronation Street); Jonny Freeman (Reiss Colwell in EastEnders); Jorgie Porter (Theresa McQueen in Hollyoaks); Diane Langton (Nana McQueen in Hollyoaks) |
| Best Actor | Angela Wynter (Yolande Trueman in EastEnders) | Peter Ash (Paul Foreman in Coronation Street); Alison King (Carla Connor in Coronation Street); Elle Mulvaney (Amy Barlow in Coronation Street); Colin Salmon (George Knight in EastEnders); Balvinder Sopal (Suki Panesar in EastEnders); Lucy Pargeter (Chas Dingle in Emmerdale); Karen Blick (Lydia Dingle in Emmerdale); Lesley Dunlop (Brenda Walker in Emmerdale); Kieron Richardson (Ste Hay in Hollyoaks); Jennifer Metcalfe (Mercedes McQueen in Hollyoaks); David Ames (Carter Shepherd in Hollyoaks) |
| Best Newcomer | Iz Hesketh (Kitty Draper in Hollyoaks) | Jack Carroll (Bobby Crawford in Coronation Street); Francesca Henry (Gina Knight in EastEnders); Beth Cordingly (Ruby Fox-Miligan in Emmerdale) |
| Best Single Episode | George confronts Eddie (EastEnders) | New Year's Day (Coronation Street); Paul and Billy's wedding (Coronation Street); Christmas Day (EastEnders); Cliff-top crash (Emmerdale); Tom and Belle's wedding (Emmerdale); Worlds Collide (Hollyoaks) |
| Best Storyline | Paul Foreman's MND diagnosis (Coronation Street) | Roy Cropper's arrest (Coronation Street); Teen bullying (Coronation Street); Child farming (EastEnders); The Six (EastEnders); Cindy Beale's return (EastEnders); Lydia Dingle's rape (Emmerdale); Eric Pollard's Parkinson's diagnosis (Emmerdale); Tom's domestic abuse of Belle (Emmerdale); Ste Hay kills Ella Richardson and covers it up (Hollyoaks); Gay conversion (Hollyoaks) |
| Best Young Performer | Charlie Wrenshall (Liam Connor Jr. in Coronation Street) | Liam McCheyne (Dylan Wilson in Coronation Street; Ellie Dadd (Amy Mitchell in EastEnders); Jaden Ladega (Denzel Danes in EastEnders); Elizabeth Green (Jade Masood in EastEnders); Amelia Flanagan (April Windsor in Emmerdale); Gabrielle Dowling (Cathy Hope in Emmerdale); Rebecca Bakes (Angelica King in Emmerdale); Ela-May Demircan (Leah Barnes in Hollyoaks); Noah Holdsworth (Oscar Osborne in Hollyoaks) |
| Soap Moment of the Year | Sixmas (EastEnders) | Stephen Reid's showdown in the pub (Coronation Street); Charity, Mack & Chloe's cliffhanger car crash (Emmerdale); Ste Hay realises he's killed Ella Richardson (Hollyoaks) |
| Best Villain | Navin Chowdhry (Nish Panesar in EastEnders) | Todd Boyce (Stephen Reid in Coronation Street); Will Mellor (Harvey Gaskell in Coronation Street); Matt Di Angelo (Dean Wicks in EastEnders); Beth Cordingly (Ruby Fox-Miligan in Emmerdale); James Chase (Thomas King in Emmerdale); David Ames (Carter Shepherd in Hollyoaks); Glynis Barber (Norma Crow in Hollyoaks) |
| Best Exit | Danny Walters (Keanu Taylor in EastEnders) | Todd Boyce (Stephen Reid in Coronation Street); Chris Gascoyne (Peter Barlow in Coronation Street); Elizabeth Counsell (Gloria Knight in EastEnders); Bhasker Patel (Rishi Sharma in Emmerdale); Sebastian Dowling (Heath Hope in Emmerdale); Owen Warner (Romeo Nightingale in Hollyoaks); Erin Palmer (Ella Richardson in Hollyoaks) |
| Inspiring Storyline of the Year | Suki Panesar comes out to her family (EastEnders) | Paul and Billy get married (Coronation Street); Jay and Honey run the London Marathon (EastEnders); Mary Goskirk's quest for love in later life (Emmerdale); Tony and Diane's child comes out as trans (Hollyoaks) |
| Best Twist | Mercedes McQueen's twins have different dads (Hollyoaks) | Tim Metcalfe is alive (Coronation Street); Peter Barlow kills Stephen Reid (Coronation Street); Cindy Beale's return (EastEnders); Keanu Taylor's Christmas Day death (EastEnders); Aaron Dingle's shock return (Emmerdale); Who killed Lydia Dingle's rapist? (Emmerdale); Dilly is Rafe's wife and Patrick's daughter (Hollyoaks) |
| Special Recognition Award | Chris Chittell (Eric Pollard in Emmerdale) | —N/a |

== Awards statistics ==
Legend:
- CO Coronation Street
- EE EastEnders
- EM Emmerdale
- HO Hollyoaks
- NE Neighbours

| Award | 2020 | 2024 |
|---|---|---|
| Best British Soap | NE | EE |
| Best Comedy Performance | —N/a | EM |
| Best Actor | NE | EE |
| Best Actress | NE | —N/a |
| Best Newcomer | NE | HO |
| Best Single Episode | —N/a | EE |
| Best Storyline | NE | CO |
| Best Young Performer | —N/a | CO |
| Soap Moment of the Year | —N/a | EE |
| Best Villain | —N/a | EE |
| Best Exit | —N/a | EE |
| Inspiring Storyline of the Year | —N/a | EE |
| Best Twist | —N/a | HO |
| Special Recognition | —N/a | EM |

== See also ==
- British Soap Awards
- Inside Soap Awards
