= Lacey Lloyd =

- Hollyoaks character
- Portrayed by: Annabelle Davis
- Duration: 2023–24
- First appearance: 18 January 2023
- Last appearance: 10 January 2024
- Introduced by: Lucy Allan
In-universe information
- Occupation: Paralegal; Solicitor

Lacey Lloyd is a fictional character from the British Channel 4 soap opera Hollyoaks, played by Annabelle Davis. Her casting was announced in December 2022 and she made her first appearance on 18 January 2023. Davis was approached for the role by the soap's producer Lucy Allan, who she had previously worked with on The Dumping Ground. The character was not originally written for a little person and the producers worked with Little People UK, a charity founded by Davis' parents, in order to ensure that Lacey was portrayed authentically. Davis worked on developing Lacey's characterisation and wanted to ensure that the character was portrayed correctly as she felt that it was important to represent minorities on TV in order to raise awareness. The actress ensured that the character was professional due to the lack of small people in certain careers that appear onscreen, and she wanted viewers to see Lacey as more than just a little person whilst also highlighting the lives of disabled people. Lacey was introduced as an aspiring lawyer and the childhood best friend of Rayne Royce (Jemma Donovan).

Her introduction scenes showed Lacey attend an awkward job interview for James Nightingale's (Gregory Finnegan) law firm and move into a house share with Rayne and several other characters. The decision to introduce Lacey and Rayne was part of the producers' idea to throwback to the earlier years of the soap, where students would live together. Davis learnt legal terminology in order to help her with the role. Many of Lacey's storylines revolved around conflicts within her work and her friendship with Rayne. Lacey also begins a relationship with her housemate Nadira Valli (Ashling O'Shea), which was Davis' favourite plot. Lacey was also central to a special Hollyoaks episode regarding disability, which Davis has praised. Throughout 2023, Rayne and Lacey's friendship begins to break down and Lacey is later involved in a "whodunit" plot when she is considered a suspect in Rayne's murder. Lacey struggles with her grief and clashes with other characters, including Nadira.

Lacey departed Hollyoaks on 10 October 2023 when she left for a job in Norwich, with the character breaking up with Nadira. However, that December it was announced that Davis would be returning, with Lacey's return scenes airing from 4–10 January 2024. The character returned to tie up loose ends from her previous departure, with Lacey's return setting the stage for the conclusion to the mystery of Rayne's killer, with Romeo Nightingale (Owen Warner) being revealed as the killer. Lacey's return also led to Nadira's departure from the show, with Lacey and Nadira reuniting and leaving the village together. Lacey has been well received by critics and her relationship with Nadira has also received praise, whilst both of Lacey's departures and her reunion with Nadira were considered emotional. However, viewers often questioned why Lacey remained friends with Rayne and predicted that she would ruin Lacey and Nadira's relationship.

== Creation and casting ==
In December 2022, it was announced that Annabelle Davis, who had appeared in The Dumping Ground between 2015 and 2022, would be debuting on Hollyoaks as Lacey Lloyd, a paralegal who would share the same house as established characters Prince McQueen (Malique Thompson-Dwyer), Romeo Nightingale (Owen Warner) and Nadira Valli (Ashling O'Shea). The news came two months after the announcement of the casting of Jemma Donovan as Rayne Royce, Lacey's best friend who would also move into house. Davis found working in a soap opera to be faster paced and there being a lot to learn, but threw herself into the role. Speaking of her casting, Davis said, "I'm so excited for you to meet Lacey! She's fun, career driven, training to be a Lawyer and now looking for a job. Fingers crossed she gets it. I've had a great time filming with the Hollyoaks gang and look forward to what Lacey gets up to." A few days ahead of Lacey's debut, Davis' father, fellow actor Warwick Davis, posted a tribute on Twitter towards his daughter, writing, "Shout out to my daughter, Annabelle Davis who debuts in the British Soap, Hollyoaks tonight. Never seen the show but will be watching tonight". Davis takes a 7-hour commute to the Hollyoaks in Liverpool set from her home near Cambridge.

"I think it's really important that on TV, you are shown all of this diversity and we can all learn from it really, raising all the awareness."

— Davis on the importance of representation on TV (2023)

The character was originally not meant to have Dwarfism. Speaking about her casting, Davis explained that Hollyoaks executive producer Lucy Allan, who Davis had worked with previously on The Dumping Ground, had approached her and explained that whilst the role of Lacey was not "written for a small person", she wanted Davis to "have a look" and see if she wanted to play her. They then had meetings on Zoom to discuss the character and the "different ways" that they could take her, which Davis thought was nice. Davis was excited to be cast as she believed that it is "so important" to raise awareness on screen. Davis is believed to be the first actor with dwarfism to appear on the soap, and Davis considered the role a chance for viewers to see someone "a bit different" on screen and to learn about the condition, which she hoped would "open doors" for other small people in other soap operas. Davis hoped that being on Hollyoaks would further the conversation about her condition and break down stereotypes.

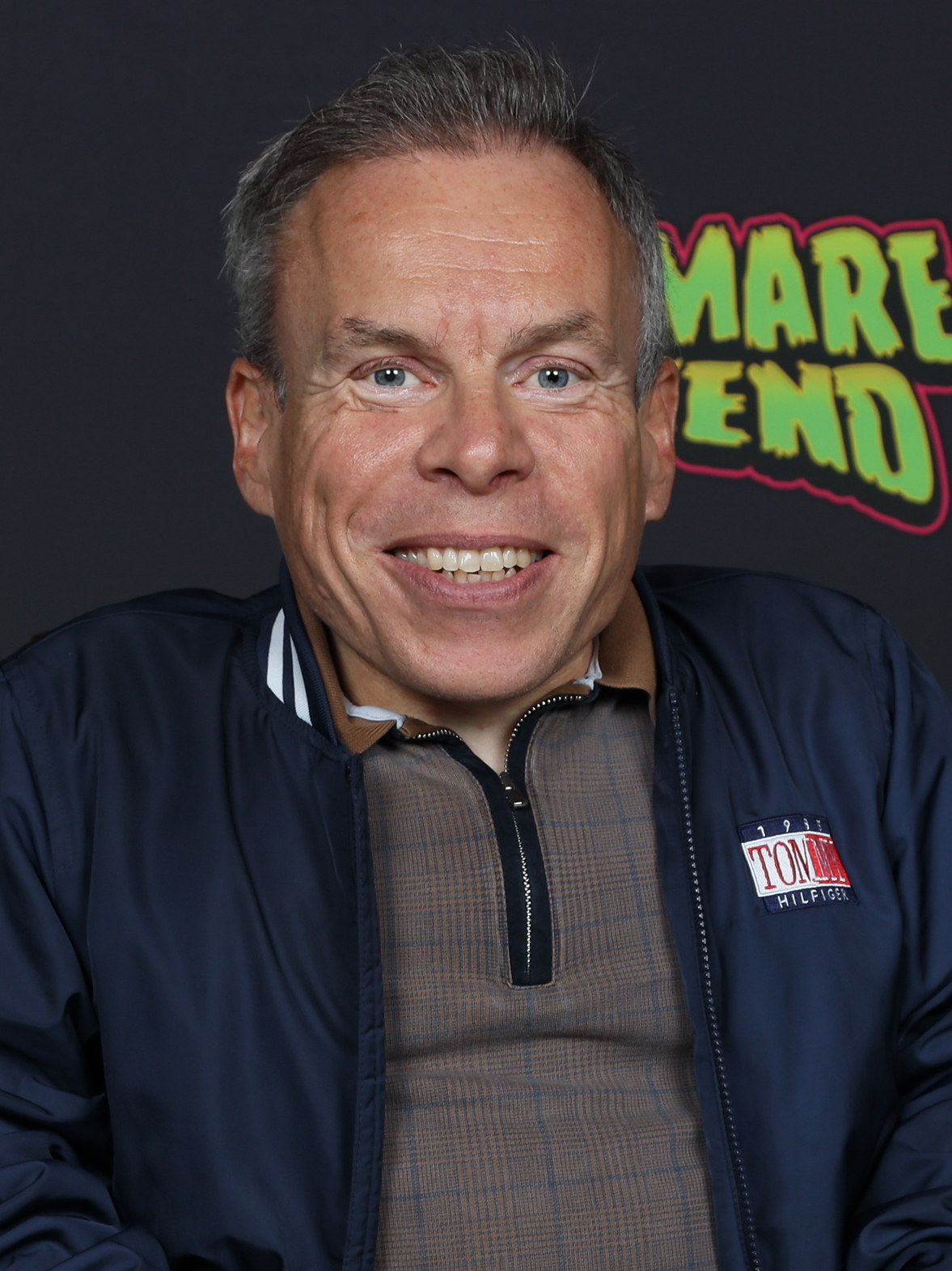
Warwick Davis, Annabelle Davis's father, congratulated her on Twitter ahead of Lacey's debut.

The decision to introduce Lacey and Rayne was part of the producers' idea to "throwback" to the earlier years of Hollyoaks, where students would live together under the same roof. An insider told Digital Spy "The new house of 20-somethings will be a throwback to the early years of the show, when batches of new students would arrive at Hollyoaks Community College and live in student halls together... Fans have often called for a return of this element in the past few years and the new group will have some huge storylines as the soap heads into 2023." When speaking about what was in store for Hollyoaks in 2023, Allan revealed that she was excited about "the twentysomethings' house", which would feature Lacey in the storylines, adding that there were some "brilliant characters" in the house. Davis called filming with her co-stars "great" and called them "fun to work with". Speaking of the characters in the houseshare, Davis called it a "cool dynamic" due to the characters having "different careers, ambitions, interests all under the same roof, all trying to figure life out", adding that "There's fun but there's a lot of heart there too. It's a difficult time in your life to navigate but they've got each other's backs." Davis and Donovan, Rayne's portrayer, had fun working together and Davis was glad to be coming in with her at the same time, as Davis considers herself quite shy and was glad she was not experiencing meeting many new people alone. Donovan was able show Davis "the ropes on how soaps work" as she had previously appeared on another soap opera, Neighbours. Donovan and Davis also bonded over coming from a "showbiz background" and both having an understanding of having "famous fathers", due to Jemma Donovan being the daughter of Jason Donovan, which Davis did initially not realise.

Davis had previously shared a flat with her The Dumping Ground co-star Emily Burnett, who portrayed Olivia Bradshaw on Hollyoaks from 2021 to 2022. Davis was "gutted" to miss Burnett as she had departed from the soap one week before Davis started, but was appreciated that Burnett gave her "lots of advice". Davis was also glad to be working with Malique Thompson-Dwyer again as he had briefly appeared in an episode of The Dumping Ground years prior. Comparing the two shows, Davis explained that Hollyoaks gave her the chance to explore "more adult topics", but noted that the "main difference" is that "the scale of a soap is a whole machine of its own", which she admitted she is still "learning the pace" of. Davis called it "fun" and a "great learning curve" and expressed that she would be able to do "anything" after learning this.

== Characterisation ==
Following Davis' casting, Lacey was described as a "fiercely loyal" and a "great" friend, as well as being "driven" and "forthright" and having aspirations of being a Paralegal. George Lewis from Digital Spy reported that Lacey would bring "calm" to Rayne's "chaos". Davis called Lacey "fun" and "career driven". Stephen Patterson from Metro wrote that Lacey is "very funny" and brings "common sense", and that she would arrive "with a bang". Due to Lacey working in law, Davis spent time learning legal terminology to help her with the role. Davis revealed that Lacey has "a lot to prove" and that she would have some "tricks up her sleeve". Davis also said that Lacey is good at her job and hoped that she would get "her teeth into some good cases". Davis revealed that whilst Lacey is always up for a party, she stays home and studies more, with the actress explaining that Lacey being "very focused on climbing the career ladder" meant that she does not always give herself enough time to "have fun".

When "reshaping" the earlier ideas for the character, Davis tried to make Lacey a woman that "other disabled women would see themselves in", as well as wanting the character to embody "a sense of "ordinariness". Davis said she had meetings about Lacey, which led to the character being "tweaked". Davis wanted Lacey to be professional, with Davis saying: "Little people in certain professions, you don't see it, and you don't think it and see that on screen. 'It's like, Oh, wow. Yeah, of course. Why? Why not?'" Whilst appearing on Loose Women, Davis expressed her appreciation for the role, saying, "It's lovely to be given a role that isn't made for a little person because that doesn't really define who you are but on the other hand, it is nice to explore things, some perspective from a little person and actually give viewers that." Hollyoaks producers worked with the charity Little People UK, founded by Davis' parents, to ensure that Lacey came across as a "well-rounded character". Davis was proud to be representing dwarfism in a mainstream show and noted that there was a team providing "insight" to make people aware of what dwarfism is like. Davis believed that soaps present minority groups as normal people, saying that Lacey "is a girl that's applied for a job. She just happens to be short". Davis' goal was to reach a place in the future where representation becomes "so normal, we don't notice it happening. That's when I think we've made it."

Davis hoped that when viewers see Lacey, they will not see "just a little person" but also "a determined woman who wants to make her mark on the world". The actress has explained that whilst it is still important to explain her differences due to being short, it would not distract from her character, and believed that the diversity would add "more colour and flavour to an already diverse show". Davis believed that it was important to give an authentic representation of disability in order to show viewers what disabled people face every day. She felt pressure in representing the experience of little people on screen, with Davis saying:

"You want to create a character that the majority of people in the community can relate to and empathise with. You become far more aware of the scripts and conscious of writing. I struggled with this at the beginning fearing I was being too overprotective. But then I realised, there are so many little people out there with their own distinctive personalities and challenges, one character could never speak for all of them."

== Development ==
=== Introduction ===
Prior to their first scenes, Johnathon Hughes from Inside Soap teased that Lacey and Rayne "work hard" but "play even harder" and that they would "take the village by storm". Hughes also wrote that Lacey wants to be a "hot-shot lawyer" and questioned whether moving to Hollyoaks could make her dream come true. Davis explained that Lacey has recently finished university but is struggling to find a job where she can train to be a lawyer. Lacey's introduction storyline involves her going to a job interview for her "dream gig" at Dee Valley Law with James Nightingale (Gregory Finnegan), but she is left discouraged when James reacts "coldly" to Lacey telling him that she wants to become a solicitor to help others, with James not seeming impressed with her "overly optimistic attitude". Stefania Sarrubba from Radio Times had questioned whether Lacey would impress James with her "idealistic views", but speculated that the two would "find some common ground". Despite Lacey going in "headstrong" and wanting to prove herself, James is "dismissive" and makes her "fight for it". However, Lacey stands up for herself in the end and gives James something to "really think about" when she talks about how people with disabilities in some workplaces "aren't looked at in the way they should be".

=== Disability episode ===
In June 2023, it was announced that Lacey would be one of the central characters in a special hour-long "groundbreaking" disability-focused Hollyoaks episode. The episode was meant to show the "intimate, ordinary and staring-you-right-in-the-face experiences" of disabled people, and was part of a process by the actors, writers and production team to "craft a broader narrative around disability" and "unravel" some truths and untruths without the use of "stunts and sensationalism". Speaking of the episode, Davis said, "Part of my discussion with the disability episode is that with soaps, every storyline is a little bit more sensationalised. But when doing some of the disabled storylines, it brings it back, really, to that kind of ground base level – and it works." One of the plots of the episode involved Maxine seeking Lacey's legal advice due to her daughter, Minnie Minniver (Eva Lorente), who has Downs Syndrome, not being allowed to take part in swimming lessons, which leads to Lacey, who has faced similar problems growing up, representing the case and educating the leisure centre. Lacey teaches Maxine that "there's sometimes a better approach to get people to hear you". The storyline echoed the story of Olympics Champion Shauna Hogan, who featured in the episode. Melissa Parker from Radio Times commented on the plot, writing "By stripping back these simple moments and echoing reality, the focus is placed on the core of humanity, staring you right in the face and highlighting the profound impact of discrimination and stigma." Davis praised the episode and believed it was a great conversation starter, saying:

"I think dedicating a whole episode to disability awareness and telling stories about disabled people is really special. These stories, while rare, they do impact a lot of lives out there, and I hope that there will be disabled people, non-disabled people out there watching it that have a little piece of it that they can relate to, or something that they can take away from that... I think the more we talk to people, the better. I've learnt things from my other disabled colleagues that I didn't know before. We're all learning in this and that, that's what I think is most special."

=== Work conflicts ===
Writers created conflict between Lacey and James when, in May 2023, Lacey finds out that James is legally representing employee Maxine's attacker, Eric Foster (Angus Castle-Doughty), who is blackmailing him; despite Lacey's "pleas to get her boss to do the right thing fail", James gives Lacey an "ultimatum" to "keep quiet or be sacked" when she threatens to "take matters into her own hands" and tell Maxine. Months later, Lacey is a catalyst for an ongoing feud between James and the McQueen family when Mercedes McQueen (Jennifer Metcalfe) finds "an ally" in Lacey, who "vows" to help move Mercedes' son, Bobby Costello (Jayden Fox) to another children's home on the condition that James will not find out. When James does find out, he orders Lacey to get back to work, as he did not want to help Bobby due to the fact that he murdered his colleague Verity Hutchinson (Eva O'Hara). Brief conflict later arises between Maxine and Lacey in an issue-based storyline when Lacey tells her that she does not need more cosmetic surgery treatment that her doctor recommended, which leads Maxine to "snap" at her and the two not speaking to each other afterwards. Maxine later understands Lacey's point and when they are back on "speaking terms", Lacey reveals that she has done research which revealed that there have been others that the doctor has tried to "upsell further treatments" to.

=== Friendship with Rayne ===
"The fan reaction is a testament to Jemma's performance. People really hate Rayne. But I’ve noticed they are equally as confused as to why Lacey is still friends with her. Honestly, at times I was too. Is this the final straw for her? Surely now she's had enough? But no, because she really does love Rayne."

— Davis on Rayne and Lacey's friendship (2023)

Lacey's friendship with Rayne was a key part of her story arc. Davis told Inside Soap that Lacey and Rayne, who have grown up together, are very close but "total opposites". She noted that they are both very career driven but on different paths, and that Rayne often forgets that "Lacey has her own dreams and ambitions" as Rayne is thinking a lot about herself. Speaking of Lacey moving into the house with Rayne and the others, Davis called it "a whirlwind of emotions and events", adding that the "chaos baffles Lacey a bit, but she likes everyone she lives with." Davis also explained that Lacey supports Rayne having her "eye" on Romeo as "he seems like a nice guy". Lacey and Rayne are shown to be keeping a "big secret" over the death of Rayne's former boyfriend, Brent Taylor (Jesse Fox), with Rayne revealing their "tragedy" when she tells Romeo that Brent died by suicide. Lacey then reveals to Romeo and Rayne that she feels that she feels responsible for Brent's death. Later that year, despite Rayne being a "master manipulator", Lacey sticks by her "best friend". Speaking of Lacey remaining friends with Rayne despite her "lies", Davis noted that Lacey is "aware" of the "damage" that Rayne is "inflicting on others" and that she needs help, and that Lacey wants to "help" and "fix" Rayne rather than "cut her out". Davis explained that Lacey has stayed loyal to Rayne due to the fact that they have grown up together, calling them "family friends" and noting that they are more like sisters, adding, "It's the unconditional love for someone that helps you always see the good in them." The dynamic begins to change when Lacey begins seeing Rayne's true colours. In September, Lacey and Rayne "fall out" after Lacey confronts Rayne and "calls her out" when she finds out that Rayne exploited "coercive control" and allowed Romeo to get called "controlling" online, but Rayne "manipulates" Lacey into not telling him the truth.

=== Relationship with Nadira ===
Prior to her debut, Davis hinted that Lacey and Nadira, one of Lacey's housemates, would get "closer" due to them having a lot of "similar qualities". It had also been teased that a potential relationship "was on the horizon" for Lacey. Later that year, Lacey begins "crushing hard" on Nadira, who feels the same way, but the two struggle to "admit their feelings for one another". James' husband, Ste Hay (Kieron Richardson) acts a "match-maker" and tries to bring Lacey and Nadira together. After Nadira supports Lacey following "Rayne's abusive tirade" and reassures her that she has done nothing wrong, Lacey, who has been inspired by Ste and James' public kiss, puts "herself first and take[s] a chance on love" by opening up to Nadira, admitting that she really likes her. A gleeful Nadira reveals that she reciprocates Lacey's feelings, which leads to the pair smiling and kissing before "enjoying a giggle". Davis told the Daily Mirror that Lacey and Nadira's relationship was her favourite of Lacey's plots so far, calling it "special" to see it grow, and said that she was grateful to work with O'Shea, Nadira's portrayer. She called the "growing relationship" between the couple "really exciting and something Lacey wasn't looking for but needed". When Lacey and Nadira tell Rayne about their relationship in a Post-credits scene, she pretends to be pleased for them but it is revealed to viewers that she is secretly unhappy about it. Stephen Patterson from Metro questioned whether "Rayne's reign of terror" would ruin the romance and whether Rayne would "resort to drastic action to keep her friend focused solely on her" due to Lacey's priorities being elsewhere. Davis hoped that Lacey and Nadira's relationship would last, but speculated that Rayne could "get in the way", saying that her "jealousy" could be "difficult for Lacey to navigate" and potentially come between the couple, though she hoped that it would not.

=== Rayne's murder ===
In September 2023, Rayne was killed off as part of a "major" Whodunnit mystery storyline. Rayne is found dead in a pool in the mansion that she and Lacey were staying in with Rayne's friends and enemies, including Romeo, in a special hour-long episode where Rayne's "twisted nature" was exposed. Lacey was considered one of the main suspects of the crime, as, despite initially always being Rayne's best friend and "biggest supporter", Lacey had recently had "her eyes opened" to Rayne's true colours. Shortly before Rayne's death, Lacey's world had been "turned upside down" when she found out that Rayne had lied about Brent having killed himself. Lacey is "horrified" to find out that Brent is still alive and tells Rayne that she is the one who should be dead, which turns out to be the last thing Lacey says to her.

Speaking about Lacey having a motive for killing Rayne, Davis told Inside Soap that "Lacey has carried Brent's 'death' for years. Rayne's lies are awful. Even though Lacey seems calm, she could snap after what Rayne has put her through." Davis' co-star, Warner, believed that Lacey was Rayne's killer due to Rayne lying to her for a long time about Brent, saying that Lacey "has been living with this trauma for so long. And all of a sudden, BOSH, years and years of being upset, has gone away because he is still alive. It's got to be her." Davis believed that Lacey was left "really frustrated" by Rayne, adding, "I think it is absolutely awful what Rayne has put her through. She has been manipulated for years and didn't even realise it. I think that she has really lost her friend in that. Even though she comes across really calm and collected, I think she could snap". Prior to the revelation, despite Lacey and Rayne having been close friends for years, their relationships had become "fractured", with Rayne not being "the nicest person to Lacey" and the pair clashing over Rayne's behaviour. Davis explained that "Lacey was very conflicted and their relationship got more and more strained. I don't think Rayne was aware of this, but Lacey definitely felt it. The distrust grew between them and created a space that neither of them were used to. Lacey never wanted that, and still cared for Rayne a lot, like a sister." Davis explained that whilst Lacey had seen the good in her friend and tried to help her, Lacey's eyes "opened to the reality of Rayne" when she realised that Rayne had used Brent's fake death to manipulate her. Davis added that the "hurt" from that "goes so deep and is irreparable. Enough to potentially put the thought of killing her in Lacey's mind even for a brief second."

Following Rayne's death, Lacey is "[d]evastated" but also "conflicted", as she "loved" Rayne but is questioning whether the friendship was real. Lacey struggles with both Rayne's death and the realisation that Rayne used her for likes. Lacey is shown to be hiding a secret and answers a "mysterious" phone call, which leads to a suspicious Nadira confronting her over why she is acting strangely. Lacey then lies to her about where she is going, with a concerned Nadira seeing Lacey leave the police station. Nadira supports Lacey and makes it clear that she will continue supporting her, but "animosity" still ensures between the couple. O'Shea, who portrays Nadira, had previously revealed that Rayne's death would come between the couple and potentially destroy their relationship, saying "I think the long-lasting effects and trauma Rayne's murder has caused will plague the entire group and make Nadira and Lacey's relationship really tricky. Sometimes people bond through trauma and sometimes it rips them apart, only time will tell!"

=== Departure and brief return ===
In early October 2023, Hollyoaks confirmed that there would be a "dramatic" exit storyline for Lacey, though it was not confirmed whether it would be a permanent departure. Leading up to the departure, Lacey continues to "struggle" with secrets relating to Rayne's murder, and Nadira questions why Lacey is not "ready to move on" when Brent makes a confession regarding Raynes' death. In the episode that originally aired on 10 October 2023, her exit aired and Lacey leaves the village "abruptly". Digital Spy reported that this was possibly not Lacey's last appearance and that she could return again due to the ongoing "Rayne mystery". In the storyline, she apologises to Nadira about her recent behaviour and reveals that she has received a job offer, but does not tell her that the job is in Norwich. A "shocked" Nadira later finds Lacey's room empty, with Lacey not wanting anyone to change her mind, saying "sometimes it's easier to whip the plaster off quick" as she waits for a taxi. Lacey's departure leads to a lonely Nadira pushing away her loved ones. James surprises Lacey with a "private car" to take her to Norwich and the two say goodbye. O'Shea revealed that following Lacey accusing Nadira of murder and leaving her "with nothing but a note", Nadira has now "lost faith in love altogether", adding that Nadira now has "locked her heart away and has no desire to seek love anymore". Davis was gifted a "special Hollyoaks Village sign" as a leaving gift. Following her last departure, Davis thanked fans for watching her, saying "This year's been crazy. It's gone so fast, I've had so much fun. Thank you all so much for watching and enjoying Lacey as much as I have, I'm really going to miss her."

"After Lacey's very abrupt exit, for Nadira to be able to sit down and listen and still be supportive and understanding, I think is incredible. For both of them to go through everything they have the past few months and still have each other I think is a real testament to their relationship...After Lacey's very harsh exit, for her to be able to come back and lay out all of those feelings, because we don't always know the best way to handle some things and Lacey chose, I think possibly, the worst way to handle it."

— Davis on Lacey's exit

On 12 December 2023, it was announced that Davis would be returning as Lacey the following month. Lacey's return was one of several characters that had been announced to return in early 2024. In the storyline, Lacey stuns Nadira when she shows up on her doorstep wanting to talk things through, but Nadira slams the door in her face. There is "frostiness" between the two due to Nadira feeling "betrayed" by Lacey's departure. Lacey then reveals that she has returned in order to be Prince's defense attorney, as he has recently been arrested for Rayne's murder. Lacey then shares a "bombshell" when she reveals that the police did not enter Rayne's sunglasses and camera that she had on the night of her death. Justin Harp from Digital Spy questioned whether Lacey would be able to prove Prince's "innocence". Lacey's return will aired on 4 January 2024. At the time of the announcement, it was unclear whether Lacey's return would be permanent or if she was only returning to help solve Rayne's murder.

It was later confirmed that her return would be brief and would also "tie up a loose end" from her October departure. Lacey's return "set[s] the stage" for the reveal of Rayne's killer as the video on the sunglasses reveal that Romeo was the one who killed Rayne in self-defence. Nadira initially struggles with seeing Lacey back, but after Lacey apologises for her sudden departure, the pair clear the air. Nadira is then "crushed" when she believes that Lacey has left again, but Lacey reveals that she hasn't actually left yet and wants Nadira to come with her, declaring her love for her "soulmate". After hearing about how Lacey pictures a future with her, Nadira is "blown away" by the invite to Norwich but chooses love and accepts the offer, wasting "little time in confessing her love for Lacey". After saying goodbye to their friends, they leave the village in a taxi to "begin their new life together". Nadira and Lacey's departure aired on 10 January 2024, and whilst Lacey's stint had intended to be short, Nadira's departure had not been announced prior to the episode being released. Davis was surprised when she learnt that Lacey and Nadira would get a "happy ending" and enjoyed filming the scenes with O'Shea, calling it "really lovely". Davis noted that she would miss the two characters but hoped that they would have a "lovely time" in Norwich. O'Shea revealed that she initially felt conflicted when Lacey returned, but was happy that Nadira got to "ride off into the sunset in a really now healthy and kind relationship".

== Storylines ==
Lacey comes to Hollyoaks for an awkward job interview with James Nightingale (Gregory Finnegan) at his law firm. She believes that the interview has gone badly due to James being dismissive but is later shocked to discover that she has received the job. Lacey and her best friend, Rayne Royce (Jemma Donovan), move into a flatshare with Prince McQueen (Malique Thompson-Dwyer), Romeo Nightingale (Owen Warner) and Nadira Valli (Ashling O'Shea). It is revealed that Lacey blames herself for the supposed suicide of Rayne's former boyfriend, Brent Taylor (Jesse Fox), as she prevented him from seeing Rayne on the night of his supposed death. Lacey works hard to prove herself in her new job and helps several residents. Lacey develops a crush on Nadira and later finally gains the courage to tell her how she feels. Nadira tells Lacey that she also likes her and they begin dating. Rayne pretends to approve but is secretly unhappy about the relationship. Lacey starts to become increasingly uncomfortable with Rayne's behaviour towards her housemates and other residents.

Lacey, Nadira, Prince and other residents accompany Rayne and Romeo to a luxury manor to do filming for one of Rayne's social media projects. At the manor, Lacey is shocked to discover that Brent is still alive, where it is revealed that his suicide had been staged by him and Rayne. A devastated Lacey ends her friendship with Rayne and tells her that she should be the one dead. Lacey is then further devastated when Rayne is founded murdered in the swimming pool. Lacey struggles both with her grief and the revelations that Rayne used and manipulated her. Lacey also learns that Rayne stole and blackmailed Nadira. Nadira becomes suspicious of Lacey when it becomes clear that she is hiding something. Despite Nadira trying to support her, Lacey begins clashing with Nadira and they argue. Lacey apologies to Nadira about lashing out. It is revealed that Lacey has received a job offer but is unsure of whether to accept it as it is in Norwich. After talking to James, she decides to accept it and leaves without speaking to Nadira, thinking that she is not the girlfriend that she Nadira deserves and not wanting anyone to change her mind. Lacey gives Lizzie a letter to give to Nadira and shares a heartful goodbye with James, who gets her a bag and her own personal driver to Norwich. She tells James that she is going to find herself and leaves the village. A devastated Nadira reads Lacey's letter, where she tells her that she is the first person that she has fallen for. Nadira subsequently struggles to cope with Lacey's departure and breakup, feeling betrayed that she left only with a note.

Months later, Lacey returns at the shared house and Nadira slams the door in her face. Lacey then reveals that she has returned to be Prince's defense attorney, who has been arrested for Rayne's murder and is in prison. Lacey reveals that she is looking for a pair of sunglasses that Rayne had her the night of her death as they had a camera on them, which Lacey believes will solve the mystery of who killed her. After the sunglasses are found, the video reveals that Romeo was the one who killed Rayne in self-defence, and Lacey tries to convince him to do the right thing and hand himself in. Nadira is initially uncomfortable around Lacey but the two clear the air after Lacey apologies for her sudden departure, with the two having a heart-to-heart. Nadira is then crushed when she believes that Lacey has left again, but Lacey reappears and tells Nadira that she pictures a future with her and wants her to come to Norwich. Nadira also confesses her love for Lacey and happily accepts. After saying goodbye to their friends, the rekindled couple leave Hollyoaks together in a taxi.

== Reception ==
Following the announcement of Lacey's introduction, Stephen Patterson from Metro said that he was looking forward to seeing Lacey on the soap and wrote "We love her already", as well being "intrigued" as to whether Lacey would "keep her cool" under James' scrutinity. Davis explained that the reaction to her casting had been positive and that she had people reach out to her to say that they were excited to see the representation on screen. Following Lacey's debut, Patterson's colleague, Pierra Willix, wrote that Lacey arrived on the show "with a bang" and that "the career driven trainee lawyer made it clear she would speak her mind". Patterson expressed support for Lacey and Nadira following these scene where they admit that they like each other, calling it a "Cutness overload" and writing ""Now down to the serious stuff. What are we thinking for couple names?Nacey or Ladira? Either way, this ship is officially underway and we have no choice but to stan." However, he warned viewers that "Lacey and Nadira's happiness could be fleeting" due to Rayne being "still at large". A poll run in Patterson's article revealed that 76% of voters thought that Rayne would ruin Lacey and Nadira's relationship. Patterson also called Lacey's departure "huge" and thought that Rayne making Lacey believe that she was the cause of Brent's "suicide" was cruel. Davis noticed during her time on the soap that fans were "confused" as to why Lacey was still friends with Rayne. Janine Yaqoob from Irish Sunday People called Lacey "power-dressing" and a "plucky lawyer".

Sophie Dainty from Digital Spy placed Lacey second on her list of the biggest suspects of Rayne's murder, citing Rayne's lies over Brent's 'death'. Following Lacey's departure, Dainty's colleague, Harriet Mitchell, called Lacey's exit "emotional", whilst Sarah Ellis from Inside Soap wrote that "Lacey's gone to a much better place now", and speculated that Lacey was taking her "secrets" to Norwich. Upon her return, Justin Harp from Digital Spy called Lacey a "popular character" and called her return a "shock". Patterson called the news of her return "huge". Patterson found Lacey and Nadira's reunion and departure from the village emotional, writing "No, you're crying", and called the couple's double departure surprising and "unexpected". Patterson also called Lacey Nadira's "soulmate" and noted how the pair rekindled their romance in almost the exact place where their romance began. Asyia Iftikhar from PinkNews called Nadira and Lacey an "important LGBTQ+ couple".
