= List of Hollyoaks characters introduced in 2023 =

Hollyoaks is a British television soap opera first broadcast on 23 October 1995. The following is a list of characters that appear in 2023, by order of first appearance. All characters are introduced by the soap's executive producer, Lucy Allan. The first characters to make their debuts are best friends Rayne Royce (Jemma Donovan) and Lacey Lloyd (Annabelle Davis). Then in March, Alex Burton (Liz Fletcher) debuted as Cindy Cunningham's (Stephanie Waring) bank manager, followed by Dillon Ray (Nathaniel Dass), the nephew-in-law of Misbah Maalik (Harvey Virdi) in April. Multiple other characters also appeared throughout the year.

== Rayne Royce ==
Rayne Royce
- Hollyoaks character
- Portrayed by: Jemma Donovan
- Duration: 2023–2024
- First appearance: Episode 6027; 17 January 2023
- Last appearance: Episode 6282; 8 January 2024
- Introduced by: Lucy Allan
In-universe information
- Other names: Louise Rayner
- Occupation: Social media influencer
- Mother: Piper Rayner

Rayne Royce (also Louise Rayner), played by Jemma Donovan, first appeared on 17 January 2023. The character and Donovan's casting details were announced on 12 October 2022. Donovan joins the serial's main cast. Of joining the show, she said: "I am thrilled to be joining the cast of Hollyoaks! I'm so grateful for this opportunity to bring something unique and fun to a new role and I can't wait to be a part of the Hollyoaks family." Donovan relocated to Liverpool for the role. She told Metro's Stephen Patterson that her first day on set was "great" and she felt "at home" straight away. Rayne is part of a new group of 20-somethings living in a shared house, which is reminiscent of the show's student-focused earlier years. She and her best friend Lacey Lloyd (Annabelle Davis) move in with Romeo Nightingale (Owen Warner), Nadira Valli (Ashling O'Shea), and Prince McQueen (Malique Thompson-Dwyer). Patterson noted that the pair "waste little time in getting up to no good, causing mischief for a number of the younger residents of the show."

Rayne was billed as "an outgoing party girl", who is "well known as a social media sensation." Donovan later described her character as humorous, "fun, fiery and ambitious." She found that she was "diving into a whole new character" in the world of social media, as Rayne is an influencer, adding "I love creating characters and bringing them to life so I'm really looking forward to doing that with Rayne." Donovan later explained that while Rayne is confident and career driven, she would also show "a whole other side" and that she does have a past. She arrives to the village on a motorbike, which Donovan admitted she was not allowed to ride. She confirmed that Rayne has been best friends with Lacey since school and that they have a genuine friendship. Donovan also teased a possible romance with Romeo, after he walks in on her in the bath. She called it "an interesting first encounter for them" and thought it was foreshadowing something between them. She added: "Rayne does turn some heads, and there's a bit of competition too. The first people she meets are Prince, Hunter and then Romeo, but she's mostly there to have fun."

On 13 September 2023, it was confirmed that Donovan would depart Hollyoaks, with Rayne being murdered in a "whodunit" storyline. Discussing her exit from the serial, Donovan stated "I am so excited to announce that Rayne's reign is finally coming to an end with an incredible stunt week that I am over the moon to share with you guys. I think it's going to be full of drama, full of love, full of chaos but the big question is... who Did It? And I'm so excited for the speculation. I can't tell you, but it's a good one so hope you all enjoy!". Rayne's death was broadcast on 26 September 2023.

== Lacey Lloyd ==
Lacey Lloyd, played by Annabelle Davis, made her first appearance on 18 January 2023. Her casting was announced in December 2023, where it was revealed that she would be in moving into a houseshare with her best friend Rayne Royce (Jemma Donovan). The decision to introduce Lacey and Rayne was part of the producers' idea to throwback to the earlier years of the soap, where students would live together under one roof. The role was initially not written for a little person and Davis helped shape the characterisation of the character.

== Alex Burton ==
Alex Burton, played by Liz Fletcher, made her first appearance on 27 March 2023. The character and casting was announced on 16 March 2023. Alex is a bank manager for Cindy Cunningham (Stephanie Waring). Speaking about joining the soap, Fletcher said: "It has been so great to join such an iconic show and work with the wonderful talented cast."

== Miley Carson ==
Miley Carson
- Hollyoaks character
- Portrayed by: Avy Berry
- Duration: 2023–2024
- First appearance: Episode 6090; 14 April 2023
- Last appearance: Episode 6402; 21 June 2024
- Introduced by: Lucy Allan
In-universe information
- Adoptive father: Scott Drinkwell (foster)
- Half-sisters: Vicky Grant (foster)

Miley Carson, played by Avy Berry, is introduced as a young girl who was fostered by Scott Drinkwell (Ross Adams), who first appeared in Episode 6090, which originally aired on 14 April 2023. Scott had been informed last minute that he was receiving an emergency placement, not long before he found his former foster daughter, Vicky Grant (Anya Lawrence), living rough. The placement was a success, however this caused Vicky to feel upset as she felt Scott was moving on from her.

In November 2023, Scott was prepared to adopt Vicky and form a family unit with her, Miley and Maxine Minniver (Nikki Sanderson), when he received the news that Miley's father was released from prison. In June 2024, Miley's father passed all the inspections and gained full custody of her and she left to live with him in Episode 6402, which aired on 21 June 2024.

== Dillon Ray ==
Dillon Ray
- Hollyoaks character
- Portrayed by: Nathaniel Dass
- Duration: 2023–2026
- First appearance: Episode 6095; 21 April 2023
- Last appearance: 16 March 2026
- Introduced by: Lucy Allan
- Spin-off appearances: Hollyoaks Later (2025)
In-universe information
- Occupation: Barista
- Mother: Aisha Ray
- Sons: James Barnes
- Uncles: Kashif Maalik
- First cousins: Sami Maalik; Farrah Maalik; Yasmine Maalik; Imran Maalik

Dillon Ray, played by Nathaniel Dass, made his first appearance on 21 April 2023. Although casting details were not announced about the character, details on Dillon were shared by Hollyoaks' executive producer Lucy Allan in an interview with Digital Spy on 11 January 2023. Dillon is the nephew of established character Misbah Maalik (Harvey Virdi) and it was stated that his arrival would cause Lucas Hay (Oscar Curtis) to begin questioning his sexuality.

Speaking about Dillon's entrance, Virdi said: "Dillon is a ball of energy – he's loud, mischievous and dresses like a rock star. It turns out he's been expelled from school, and Misbah knows that Dillon's mother won't be happy about that. There are layers to uncover about Dillon as time goes on – he has a big, loud front, but Misbah starts to see a different side [to him]. It's just what the family needs [after Shaq's exit]." Dass also teased "potential romances" to come about for the character.

In 2025, Dass received a nomination in the "Soaps - Best Actor" category the Digital Spy Reader Awards. Dillon and Frankie's exploitation storyline was also nominated for "Best Soap Storyline".

== Juan Pèrez ==
Juan Pèrez, played by Ariel Butwyna, made his first appearance on 9 May 2023. The character and casting was announced on 24 March 2023. Juan is a Spanish dancer and choreographer who grabs the attention of Scott Drinkwell (Ross Adams) during a visit to Liverpool, with the character being touted as a love interest for Scott.

Speaking about joining the soap, Butwyna, said: "I'm having a fantastic time filming with Hollyoaks. I am so happy to be playing the role of Juan, who has such a lovely and sweet storyline with Scott. Working with Ross Adams is a true pleasure, and I've even had the chance to share some time on set with Alex Fletcher [Scott's aunt, Diane Hutchinson]— everyone is so welcoming. Truly, a very kind and fun environment to work in.""

== Rafe Harcourt ==
Rafe Harcourt
- Hollyoaks character
- Portrayed by: Chris Gordon
- Duration: 2023–2024
- First appearance: Episode 6108; 10 May 2023
- Last appearance: Episode 6289; 16 January 2024
- Introduced by: Lucy Allan
In-universe information
- Occupation: Businessman
- Wife: Dilly Harcourt (until 2024)

Lord Rafferty "Rafe" Harcourt, played by Chris Gordon, made his first appearance on 10 May 2023. Rafe is a member of nobility and is the Earl of Dee who will meet Sienna Blake (Anna Passey) at the Chester Races. The pair will strike up a bond, potentially jeopardising her relationship with Ethan Williams (Matthew James-Bailey). He is also the husband of Dilly Harcourt.

Speaking about his character and casting, Gordon said: "Joining the team at Hollyoaks feels a bit like meeting the family of a partner you really like – a little bit intimidating, but also very fulfilling. There's a real closeness throughout the departments and I've been welcomed into the fold with grace. Working with Anna has been an utter joy. Not only as an actor but as a person too. Sienna's journey collides with Rafe and there's... well, fireworks! He's not the usual man around town. The mystery and complexity of a road less travelled is something I'm really looking forward to playing and sharing with the fans." Gordon made a previously unannounced departure as Rafe on 15 January 2024 when he died.

== Terry Smart ==
Terry Smart, played by Ryan Pope, made his first appearance on 6 June 2023. The character and casting was announced on 1 June 2023. Terry is a former criminal associate of Norma Crow (Glynis Barber) and arrives in the village after being released from prison, aiming for compensation from Norma. During his time in the village, he will be noticed by Jack Osborne (Jimmy McKenna) who recognises the criminal from when he arrested him.

== Dilly Harcourt ==
Cordelia "Dilly" Harcourt, played by Emma Johnsey-Smith, made her first appearance on 14 July 2023. The character and casting were announced on 30 June 2023. Dilly is the wife of Rafe Harcourt (Chris Gordon) and will grow suspicious of Sienna Blake's (Anna Passey) intentions with her husband, believing her to be a gold-digger after the family fortune.

Speaking about her casting, Johnsey-Smith said, "I'm very excited to have joined the cast of Hollyoaks. My time on the show so far has been great and all the cast and crew have been super welcoming. Dilly is fiery, quick-witted and a force to be reckoned with. Her kamikaze-like nature sees her in many a chaotic moment but deep down, there is a real vulnerable side that I'm excited for the audience to see."

== Carter Shepherd ==
Carter Shepherd
- Hollyoaks character
- Portrayed by: David Ames
- Duration: 2023–2024
- First appearance: Episode 6178; 16 August 2023
- Last appearance: Episode 6378; 20 May 2024
- Introduced by: Lucy Allan
In-universe information
- Occupation: Headteacher; Gay conversion therapist
- Wife: Lexi Calder (backstory)
- Daughters: Freya Calder

Carter Shepherd, played by David Ames made his first appearance on 16 August 2023. The character and casting was announced on 2 June 2023. Carter will be the new headteacher at Hollyoaks High, and is also the father of established character Freya Calder (Ellie Henry), who sustained life-changing injuries the year before. Ames said his character would be hoping to build a relationship with his estranged daughter. Speaking about joining the soap, the actor said: "I am incredibly excited to join the Hollyoaks cast as such an intricately layered character with a very poignant and vital storyline to come."

On 14 May 2024, Ames announced his departure from Hollyoaks. Carter's final scenes aired the following week on 20 May 2024 at the conclusion of the gay conversion therapy storyline.

=== Reception ===
The gay-conversion therapy storyline was nominated for "Best Storyline" in the Radio Times soap awards 2024. His work in the storyline also gained him a nomination for "Best Villain" and "Best Actor".

== Faye Fuller ==
Faye Fuller, played by Maddy Smedley, made her first appearance on 21 August 2023. The character and casting was announced on 8 August 2023. Faye serves as a new talent agent for Rayne Royce (Jemma Donovan) following setbacks for the character in her social media influencer career. A statement said that Faye would "bring the laughs" while Smedley billed her character as "trashy, sassy and a bit cutthroat" saying she was a mix between "Del Boy and Deborah Meaden".

== Brent Taylor ==
Brent Taylor, played by Jesse Fox, made his first appearance on 12 September 2023. The character is the ex-boyfriend of Rayne Royce (Jemma Donovan) and had been previously referred to on-screen, with Rayne lying about him having committed suicide. Brent is met by Peri Lomax (Ruby O'Donnell) who discovers he is alive and hopes to use him to bring Rayne down, unaware that he is still in love with her and willing to do anything for her.

Speaking about his character, Fox said: "I was very excited when I got the part. It was so cool to be a part of such a big storyline that the show has been building up to for a while. Brent adores Rayne and has very much not given up on them being together. The nature of their relationship has taken him to a place where he's totally lost perspective and his sense of self, which in turn makes him quite dangerous. He'd pretty much do anything to try to make Rayne happy. I think people may understandably be hostile towards him because – being in that Rayne whirlpool – he makes some seriously big mistakes. You can expect clashes and fireworks with the likes of Peri and Romeo."

== Camilla Bassington-Hart ==
Camilla Bassington-Hart, played by Dylan Morris, made her first appearance on 2 October 2023. The character and casting was revealed in an annual autumn trailer for Hollyoaks on 18 September 2023. Camilla is the ex-girlfriend of Rafe Harcourt (Chris Gordon) and arrives as he grows closer to Sienna Blake (Anna Passey), claiming to the love of his life. Speaking on her casting, Morris said: "Filming at Hollyoaks so far has been amazing. Playing Camilla is so much fun, she's so unpredictable and ready to cause absolute chaos."

== Andre Clark ==
Andre Clark, portrayed by David Joshua-Anthony, and made his first appearance on 6 December 2023. The character's casting and details were all announced on 24 November 2023. He is introduced as the half-brother of established character Vicky Grant (Anya Lawrence), although she is initially unaware of their relation. The character has been billed as "charismatic" and will move in with Dillon Ray (Nathaniel Dass) and the Maalik family due to his turbulent home life. Speaking about joining the show, Joshua-Anthony said, "Being welcomed into the Hollyoaks family has been amazing and I'm enjoying the process of playing Andre. He is a kid who always thinks one step ahead of everyone else and is filled with so many thoughts and ideas. I can't wait to see what life in the village has in store for him."

== Other characters ==
List of other 2023 characters
Character	Episode(s)	Original broadcast date(s)	Actor	Details
Tracey	6016, 6020	3–6 January	Kate Dobson	A therapist at an eating disorder clinic who admits Imran Maalik (Ijaz Rana). After Imran runs away from the clinic, Tracey comes to the village when he decides to go back after offering comfort over his illness.
Justine	6016	3 January	Fabienne Poilini-Castle	A patient at the eating disorder clinic that Imran Maalik (Ijaz Rana) is admitted to. He bonds with Justine, but grows agitated during a game of Snakes & Ladders when he starts losing, causing him to storm away from her.
Seamus	6020	6 January	Benedict Shaw	A former flatmate of Eric Foster (Angus Castle-Doughty) who meets with Maxine Minniver (Nikki Sanderson) and James Nightingale (Gregory Finnegan) where he tells about how dangerous Eric is.
Dr Shepherd	6027–6028	17–18 January	Miranda Nolan	A doctor who treats Warren Fox (Jamie Lomas) when his liver begins to fail. After discovering that Norma Crow (Glynis Barber) is a match, she tells Norma the surgery can happen right away, spooking her and causing her to flee. Due to her disappearance, Dr Shepherd tells Warren that the surgery may be cancelled, but it's able to go ahead when Norma returns.
Dr Stephens	6030, 6101–6103, 6113	20 January–16 May	Harry Long	A doctor who tells Juliet Nightingale (Niamh Blackshaw) that her chemotherapy is not working and she will need a more aggressive course. When Peri Lomax (Ruby O'Donnell) attempts to resign from the hospital after giving Juliet a virus, he refuses her resignation, prompting her to destroy a waiting room. Dr Stephens subsequently fires her, and on recommendation from senior staff prevents her from re-entering the hospital. After a plea from Nadira Valli (Ashling O'Shea), he agrees to allow Peri to visit Juliet. After Juliet's condition worsens, he alongside a nurse tells Juliet that her cancer is terminal.
Mikey	6030	20 January	Anthony Wallace	The ex-boyfriend of Rayne Royce (Jemma Donovan) who arrives in the village after she steals his motorcycle. He gives Prince McQueen (Malique Thompson-Dwyer) and Hunter McQueen (Theo Graham) the money he owes Rayne, but also issues them a warning about her.
Rocco	6039, 6041	2–6 February	Bobby Brown	Two boys who crash a going away party being thrown for Vicky Grant (Anya Lawrence). Leah Barnes (Ela-May Demircan) invites the two boys to join the group after developing a crush on Rocco. Rocco, Xavier, Leah and Charlie Dean (Charlie Behan) go into Charlie's tent and start smoking weed, with Vicky joining later. Rocco then offers an ecstasy pill around, although Charlie refuses. In a flashback, Rocco accompanies Vicky outside when she feels faint, while Xavier convinces Leah and Charlie to plan to take the ecstasy pill.
Xavier	6039, 6041	2–6 February	Jack Davies	
Caitlin	6041–6042	6–7 February	Emily Aston	The mother of Vicky Grant (Anya Lawrence) who arrives in the village when she accidentally overdoses. She berates Scott Drinkwell (Ross Adams) for allowing Vicky to go on the trip where she overdosed, pledging to ban him from being allowed to foster another child. Due to the situation, Caitlin decides Vicky shouldn't move back with her, but convinces her to move in with a foster family in Margate to be closer to her.
Mike	6043	8 February	Kieran Hall	A social worker for Vicky Grant (Anya Lawrence) who visits Scott Drinkwell (Ross Adams) when Vicky is about to move to Margate.
Doctor	6045	10 February	Rayanna Dibs	A doctor who treats Diane Hutchinson (Alex Fletcher) as she continued to recover after being shot with a crossbow by Eric Foster (Angus Castle-Doughty).
Perry	6046	13 February	Freddie Pearson	A plumber that Peri Lomax (Ruby O'Donnell) goes on a date with and convinces to try and fix her shower. When Perry comes down shirtless, James Nightingale (Gregory Finnegan) berates her for sleeping with him, causing an argument. Peri decides not to move things forward with Perry.
Prison Contractor	6049	16 February	Katy Federman	A prison contractor who speaks with Honour Chen-Williams (Vera Chok) after she hits Eric Foster (Angus Castle-Doughty). Following a passionate defence from Maxine Minniver (Nikki Sanderson) backing Honour's actions, the prison contractor terminates her contract.
Bouncer	6053	22 February	Dave Finnigan	A bouncer who prevents Peri Lomax (Ruby O'Donnell) and Romeo Nightingale (Owen Warner) from entering The Loft because of their clothing. Peri manages to convince the bouncer to let her in to find Juliet Nightingale (Niamh Blackshaw).
Mr Reid	6055, 6057	24–28 February	Toby Hadoke	A governor for Hollyoaks High who meets with Sally St. Claire (Annie Wallace) and Nancy Osborne (Jessica Fox), wno nervously tells him about the scandals at the school. Mr Reid later suspends Sally when she snaps at him because he tells her to stop focusing on student welfare, he fires her.
Taz	6055, 6068, 6116–6118, 6134–6135	24 February–16 June	Keaton Lansley	A drug dealer who sells cannabis to Charlie Dean (Charlie Behan). He later arrives at the school to sell more drugs to Charlie. With Charlie falling behind in his payments, he has him steal games consoles from the newly opened youth club in order to try and scare off Felix Westwood (Richard Blackwood). Both the heist and Taz's further threats do not work, leading to him goading DeMarcus Westwood (Tomi Ade), before attacking him. At the youth club, Taz sells drugs to Charlie, but when they're caught by the police be believes Dillon Ray (Nathaniel Dass) to have set them up.
Fireman Greg	6056, 6072, 6250	27 February–24 November	Scott Dyet	A fireman who is called out to La Gymnastique after Leela Lomax (Kirsty-Leigh Porter) triggers the fire alarm. Leela convinces Greg and the rest of the firemen to stay for the gym's 'Singles Night', where he starts talking to Donna-Marie Quinn (Lucy-Jo Hudson). Greg is impressed when Donna-Marie defends herself against Harold and takes her on a date. When Warren Fox (Jamie Lomas) and Norma Crow (Glynis Barber) crash they car into the Cunningham Grande Bazaar, Fireman Greg helps with the rescue effort. Fireman Greg is present at the firefighter's annual Christmas party.
Harold	6056, 6094–6095	27 February, 20–21 April	Stuart Ramsey	A property developer who attempts to buy a vacant lot to concert into luxury flats. Felix Westwood (Richard Blackwood) also wants the property to turn into a youth club, and with the help of Tony Hutchinson (Nick Pickard) and DeMarcus Westwood (Tomi Ade), he convinces Harold that an endangered bird species lives nearby and the development would be unable to go ahead. Harold then goes to La Gymnastique's 'Singles Night' and berates Donna-Marie Quinn (Lucy-Jo Hudson) who defends herself and throws Harold out. In a moment of weakness, Donna-Marie calls Harold to buy drugs, but he refuses to give them to her unless she sleeps with him, which she reluctantly does. The following day, she prepares to leave with Harold until a passionate plea from Juliet Nightingale (Niamh Blackshaw) changes her mind.
Ms Thompson	6064	9 March	Simone Holmes	A social worker who does a check on Warren Fox (Jamie Lomas) and Norma Crow's (Glynis Barber) flat after Sebastian Blake (Teddie Williamson) is reported when he pushes Dee Dee Hutchinson (Lacey Findlow) off a slide, breaking her arm. Although the pair try to present their environment as welcoming when Ms Thompson enters the flat, they find it to have been thrashed.
Danny Beard	6067–6068, 6148	14–15 March, 5 July	Themself	A drag queen and winner of the fourth series of RuPaul's Drag Race UK who meets Peri Lomax (Ruby O'Donnell) and Juliet Nightingale (Niamh Blackshaw) in Brighton after they lose their belongings. Danny Beard helps them get back to Chester, where they are performing later in the night, asking Sienna Blake (Anna Passey) and Romeo Nightingale (Owen Warner) to be guests of honour at Ste Hay (Kieron Richardson) and James Nightingale's (Gregory Finnegan) upcoming wedding. Following Juliet's death, Danny appears in a video message paying tribute to her.
Dr Dowler	6073–6074	22–23 March	Rachel Dale	A doctor who tells Darren Osborne (Ashley Taylor Dawson) and Nancy Osborne (Jessica Fox) about their daughter Morgan's heart defect. Dr Dowler goes over surgery options to correct the defect, telling them about a doctor in Detroit, Michigan who could help the family.
Roman	6083	5 April	Jamie Dorrington	An associate of Norma Crow (Glynis Barber) who meets with Warren Fox (Jamie Lomas) and Felix Westwood (Richard Blackwood) to fit devices into cars. After insulting Felix's girlfriend, Mercedes McQueen (Jennifer Metcalfe), she locks him in a car, prompting him to storm off once he's released.
Woman Bidder	6086	10 April	Helen Aylott	A woman bidder who bids £200 to go on a date with a man at a charity event hosted by Rayne Royce (Jemma Donovan).
Francis Butler	6091–6094, 6098	17–26 April	Janik Rajapakse	An accountant who visits the Cunningham Grande Bazaar to report back to his client, a potential buyer of the property. Cindy Cunningham (Stephanie Waring) tries talking him out of the deal, but when she fails, she convinces Zara Morgan (Kelly Condron) to go on a date with him. During the date, Zara learns of his conservative views, berating him, allowing Cindy to steal his briefcase. Francis later goes to Cindy, Zara and Grace Black's (Tamara Wall) casino night, unaware he is playing with fake money. After leaving, Cindy discovers his card and tries getting his details. Francis later warns her the card belongs to his boss. He later arrives at the McQueen's home to tell them that their rent is increasing and that they face eviction.
Sven Ström	6097, 6100–6101, 6106	25 April–8 May	Hampus Engstrand	A Swedish fan of the Eurovision Song Contest who stays with the McQueen family when Goldie McQueen (Chelsee Healey) accidentally advertises a room for £30 a week. During his time, Goldie attempts to flirt with Sven and he also shows Romeo Nightingale (Owen Warner) how to properly dance to ABBA.
Angelina Zarzecki	6102	2 May	Julia Hural	A Ukrainian refugee who walks Vicky Grant (Anya Lawrence) to a train station when she can't get work at a Eurovision Song Contest event. Vicky confides in Angelina about not wanting to go back to school, but Angelina implores her to focus on her future, due to her own inability to study because of the war in her home country.
Event Organiser	6102	2 May	Karly Macguire	An event organiser for the Eurovision Song Contest who assigns Scott Drinkwell (Ross Adams) to work with Sonia, before telling Vicky Grant (Anya Lawrence) there was no more work needed.
Sonia	6102, 6107–6110	2–12 May	Herself	A singer and former Eurovision contestant who employs Scott Drinkwell (Ross Adams) as her PA during her time in Liverpool for the competition. She is able to reunite Scott with his love interest, Juan Pèrez (Ariel Butwyna) and later performs at The Dog in the Pond public house with Scott and Diane Hutchinson (Alex Fletcher) as her backing dancers.
Sam Richards	6108–6110	10–12 May	Tom Gill	A man on a stag-do who meets Goldie McQueen (Chelsee Healey) at the Chester Races while dressed as a jockey. Goldie and him spend time together, but when she arrives back from the races without her winnings, she believes Sam to have stolen them. She invites Sam to a fake strip club and when he arrives with his friends, all dressed as Sam Ryder, he is confronted by Mercedes McQueen (Jennifer Metcalfe). Sam promises to return the money, but only on the condition that he personally hands it to Goldie after developing feelings for her.
Scott Mills	6110	12 May	Himself	A presenter for the Eurovision Song Contest who arrives in the village after his SatNav malfunctions and his car runs out of petrol. Tony Hutchinson (Nick Pickard) and Goldie McQueen (Chelsee Healey) drive him to the contest, and he thanks the pair during live commentary for the show.
Laura	6113	16 May	Christine Brennan	A nurse who alongside Dr. Stephens tells Juliet Nightingale (Niamh Blackshaw) that her cancer is terminal.
Aisha Ray	6118–6120	24–26 May	Perveen Hussain	The mother of Dillon Ray (Nathaniel Dass) who arrives in the village after he begins living with his aunt, Misbah Maalik (Harvey Virdi). Aisha immediately berates her son for his outfit and eyeliner, getting him to wear plainer clothing. Dillon eventually comes out to his mum, but she rejects what he says. Over a drink with Misbah, she tells her that she will not be able to accept Dillon and leaves him in her care, leaving without saying goodbye to him.
Truck Driver	6123	31 May	David Archer	A truck driver that Cindy Cunningham (Stephanie Waring) believes is removing the phone box in tribute to Luke Morgan (Gary Lucy). Cindy attempts to flirt with the driver, despite him telling her he's gay while Grace Black (Tamara Wall) attempts to steal his keys. When he notices Grace, she knocks him out, while Cindy discovers the driver was only moving a port-a-loo.
Mr Livingston	6132	13 June	Mitesh Soni	A surgeon who operates on Yasmine Cunningham (Haiesha Mistry) after she suffers from an ectopic pregnancy. During the surgery he has to terminate the pregnancy, and following further analysis of scans taken of Yasmine tells her and Tom Cunningham (Ellis Hollins) that they will no longer be able to naturally conceive another child.
Police Officer	6137	20 June	Katherine Quinn	A police officer who brings Sam Chen-Williams (Matthew McGivern) in for questioning after Maxine Minniver (Nikki Sanderson) reports him for harassing Zoe Anderson (Garcia Brown).
Security Guard	6143–6144	28–29 June	Dwayne Scantlebury	A security guard who is knocked out by Grace Black (Tamara Wall) during a bank heist. Once he regains consciousness, he calls for an armed back-up.
Carl	6146	3 July	Ben Boskovic	A nurse specialising in treatment for diabetes, who speaks to Joel Dexter (Rory Douglas-Speed) after he is diagnosed with Type 1 diabetes.
Gabby	6146	3 July	Lucy Polgar	A lifeguard who prevents Minnie Minniver (Eva Lorente) from swimming because of her Down syndrome, prompting anger from Maxine Minniver (Nikki Sanderson). Lacey Lloyd (Annabelle Davis) convinces Maxine and Gabby to have a dialogue and arrange a one-on-one session to prove that Minnie can properly swim.
Shauna Hogan	6146	3 July	Herself	A Special Olympics champion who meets with Minnie Minniver (Eva Lorente) after she is stopped from swimming at a leisure centre. She later hands Minnie one of her medals.
Vicar	6148	5 July	Philip Broadbent	A vicar who conducts the funeral service for Juliet Nightingale (Niamh Blackshaw).
Kenneth	6159	20 July	Anthony Crank	A potential investor for the Earl of Dee Awards who meets with Scott Drinkwell (Ross Adams) and John Paul McQueen (James Sutton) on a Pride-themed night at The Loft. Kenneth is put off by Scott's informality, however John Paul is able to convince him to invest. After witnessing John Paul de-escalate a homophobic incident, Kenneth kisses him, however later leaves the event after feeling ill.
Jackson	6159, 6211–6212, 6227–6228	20 July–25 October	Tom Lucas-Collins	A man who attends a Pride-themed night at The Loft alongside a group of friends where they homophobically mock those present. When Goldie McQueen (Chelsee Healey) calls them out for it, Jackson gets aggressive, prompting an incident. John Paul McQueen (James Sutton) de-esclates the incident and has Jackson and his friends ejected by security, blowing him a kiss. When John Paul leaves the club, Jackson and his friends attack him until they're run off by Scott Drinkwell (Ross Adams) and Ste Hay (Kieron Richardson). John Paul is later shocked when he goes to The Loft months after the attack and sees Jackson and Carter Shepherd (David Ames) being friends with one another. When John Paul is invited on a camping trip with Carter, he is surprised when Jackson arrives and initially leaves before coming back. During the trip, Carter implores John Paul to forgive Jackson and while initially hesitant, he eventually does so.
Bill	6177	15 August	Terry Corbett	A client of Donna-Marie Quinn (Lucy-Jo Hudson) who meets her at La Gymnastique. When their encounter is interrupted by Leela Lomax (Kirsty-Leigh Porter), he injures Leela as she calls him out.
Drug Dealer	6178–6180	16–18 August	Greg Costello	A drug dealer who sells Sienna Blake (Anna Passey) that she uses to convince Rafe Harcourt (Chris Gordon) that his sister, Dilly Harcourt (Emma Johnsey-Smith) has relapsed. The dealer later sells to Donna-Marie Quinn (Lucy-Jo Hudson) and threatens to wreck the gym when she's not able to pay. Under the threats, Peri Lomax (Ruby O'Donnell) pays him off.
Gwen Tarquin	6181	21 August	Winnie Southgate	A social media influencer who throws a party attended by Rayne Royce (Jemma Donovan) and Faye Fuller (Maddy Smedly). Gwen gets irritated by Rayne's lack of involvement in the campaign's environmental message and ends up recruiting Lizzie Chen-Williams (Lily Best) to help her.
Katy Rickitt	6184	24 August	Herself	A reporter for Good Morning Britain who reports from Hollyoaks High as students get their GCSE results. She interviews Leah Barnes (Ela-May Demircan) before being barged out the way by Charlie Dean (Charlie Behan) when he fails his exams.
Irvine	6185–6188	25–30 August	Jonathan Ojinnaka	An events promoter for underground illegal boxing who ignores Felix Westwood's (Richard Blackwood) request to fight until he offers to do it for free. Irvine supervises the fight until it's broken up by Warren Fox (Jamie Lomas), prompting Irvine to later confront Felix about losing him money. Felix agrees to go on a fighting tour with Irvine for no pay.
Dr Cam	6191	4 September	Nadeam Suhail	A cosmetics surgeon who removes the scar from Maxine Minniver's (Nikki Sanderson) face, but attempts to convince her to get further plastic surgery. Lacey Lloyd (Annabelle Davis) and Vicky Grant (Anya Lawrence) convince Maxine not to go further, which leads Maxine creating a video about Dr Cam. He later arrives at the legal firm and threatens Maxine with slander if she does not remove the video.
Cheryl	6197–6198 6213–6216, 6222	12 September–18 October	Tina Harris	The mother of Brent Taylor (Jesse Fox) who meets with Peri Lomax (Ruby O'Donnell) and reveals to her that Brent is still alive. After Brent is arrested for the murder of Rayne Royce (Jemma Donovan), Cheryl arrives in the village protesting his innocence and attempting to blame the murder on Romeo Nightingale (Owen Warner). After Brent is attacked in prison, Cheryl accuses James Nightingale (Gregory Finnegan) of orchestrating the attack.
Flick	6200	15 September	Grace Bowker	A model and friend of Nadira Valli (Ashling O'Shea) hired for a bridal shoot with Rafe Harcourt (Chris Gordon). Sienna Blake (Anna Passey) steals the engagement ring intended for Flick to wear, planting it in her bag and framing her for attempting to steal it, prompting Rafe to fire Flick and threaten to call the police.
Billy	6203–6204	20–21 September	Micky Dartford	A man who meets John Paul McQueen (James Sutton) and Carter Shepherd (David Ames) at The Loft. Billy begins flirting with John Paul before arguing with Carter who attempts to stop him. Billy falls under the impression that John Paul and Carter are a couple before John Paul asks him to leave.
Mr Bury	6204	21 September	Alan French	An admissions officer for a private school that Sienna Blake (Anna Passey) attempts to get her twins Sophie (Scarlett Kerr) and Sebastian Blake (Teddie Williamson) admitted to. She convinces Ste Hay (Kieron Richardson) to pose as her husband, but the scheme is foiled when Ste's husband, James Nightingale (Gregory Finnegan) arrives. Although Mr Bury implies to Sienna that the twins won't be admitted to the school, he is convinced otherwise by Rafe Harcourt (Chris Gordon).
Gareth	6205, 6212, 6228, 6238, 6261, 6279, 6280, 6292, 6295	22 September 2023–24 January 2024	Peter McPherson	A member of Carter Shepherd (David Ames) self-help group. Carter asks Gareth to keep an eye on John Paul McQueen (James Sutton) as he plans to stop John Paul from being gay. Carter later gives Gareth a self-help session, which is witnessed by Goldie McQueen (Chelsee Healey). Gareth later witnesses Carter and John Paul kissing and films the encounter, threatening Carter that he would release the footage. After gaining assurances from Carter that he wouldn't kiss John Paul again, Gareth relents.
Detective Jones	6206–6207	25–26 September	Liz May Brice	A detective who interviews several residents following the murder of Rayne Royce (Jemma Donovan).
DI Robson	6207, 6254–6256, 6284	26 September 2023–9 January 2024	James Sheldon	A police officer who interviews Zoe Anderson (Garcia Brown) following the murder of Rayne Royce (Jemma Donovan). He later interviews Peri Lomax (Ruby O'Donnell) and Romeo Nightingale (Owen Warner) after learning about holes in their alibis, before arresting Prince McQueen (Malique Thompson-Dwyer) for the murder. DI Robson later investigates Romeo's disappearance.
Reporter	6209	28 September	Frederica Davies	A reporter who interview Lizzie Chen-Williams (Lily Best) following the murder of Rayne Royce (Jemma Donovan).
Piper Rayner	6220, 6222	13–17 October	Saskia Butler	The mother of Rayne Royce (Jemma Donovan) who arrives in the village following her daughter's murder. Piper is initially unimpressed with Romeo Nightingale's (Owen Warner) plans for a memorial for Rayne, but is won round after seeing how much he cared for her.
Libby	6222	17 October	Jess Qualter	A social media influencer who attends the memorial for Rayne Royce (Jemma Donovan). She attempts to charge her phone in The Dog in the Pond, but is rejected by Tony Hutchinson (Nick Pickard). She later wins Tony around by promising to promote the pub in exchange for a free meal.
Helen	6223–6224	18–19 October	Stephanie Clift	A journalist who interviews Tony Hutchinson (Nick Pickard) for an article in the Chester Herald. However, after hearing some of Tony's darker stories from Jack Osborne (Jimmy McKenna) she publishes an article that leaves Tony unimpressed. She returns to The Dog in the Pond to get Tony's side of the story, but he orders her out.
Travis	6226	23 October	Glen Fox	The boyfriend of Myra McQueen (Nicole Barber-Lane) who buys Matthew McQueen (Matthew Clohessy) a new bike before advising John Paul McQueen (James Sutton) to try to be a better father.
Britney	6230, 6232	27–31 October	Fia Houston-Hamilton	A fan of Rayne Royce (Jemma Donovan) who leads a memorial in her honour. During her speech, she notices Peri Lomax (Ruby O'Donnell) present and goads her. After Peri is brought in for questioning over Rayne's death, Britney goads Leela Lomax (Kirsty-Leigh Porter), who attacks her.
Chief Inspector Mottram	6234	2 November	Nicholas Camm	The chief inspector of police who James Nightingale (Gregory Finnegan) attempts to speak to at a masquerade ball. Mottram initially ignores James until he recognises Ste Hay (Kieron Richardson) as his cleaner.
Dr Weaver	6239–6254	9–30 November	Kirsty Hoiles	A therapist for Felix Westwood (Richard Blackwood) after he suffers from a psychotic break. She later supervises a session between Felix and Mercedes McQueen (Jennifer Metcalfe).
Debt Collector	6242–6243	14–15 November	Nicola McRoy	A debt collector who attempts to visit Darren Osborne (Ashley Taylor Dawson) before confronting him at his workplace. The debt collector attempts to work out a payment plan with Darren even though he can't pay. Darren then robs the till at The Dog in the Pond to give the debt collector some money.
Frank Spinatra	6244	16 November	Robbie Brett-Taylor	A male stripper tribute act of Frank Sinatra who is accidentally booked by Pearl Anderson (Dawn Hope) for Jack Osborne's (Jimmy McKenna) 70th birthday.
Thug	6245	17 November	Sam Melvin	A thug who attacks Darren Osborne (Ashley Taylor Dawson) after he tries carrying out an illegal deal. Warren Fox (Jamie Lomas) and Felix Westwood (Richard Blackwood) interrupt the beating, and when the thug goads Warren, he is attacked in return.
Counsellor	6253	29 November	Natalie Grady	A counsellor for Peri Lomax (Ruby O'Donnell). During a session, Peri has a minor panic attack and when the counsellor attempts to help, Peri ends the session.
Influencer	6253	29 November	Henry Irwin	An influencer who uploads a video following the murder of Rayne Royce (Jemma Donovan) claiming that shadows in it disprove all of the suspects' alibis.
Sandra	6262	12 December	Melanie Ash	A teacher at Hollyoaks High who gets drunk at the annual Christmas party and flirts with Beau Ramsey (Jon-Paul Bell) and Sally St. Claire (Annie Wallace).
Tia Kofi	6267	19 December	Themself	A drag queen who poses as a rival to Scott Drinkwell (Ross Adams) when he leads the Christmas Fairy Parade.
Sonographer	6280, 6310	29 December 2023–14 February 2024	Sara Abanur	A sonographer who performs an ultrasound on Mercedes McQueen (Jennifer Metcalfe). Due to the sonographer's slowness to find a heartbeat, when she leaves to consult a second opinion, Mercedes leaves believing that she's miscarried. She later performs an ultrasound on Leela Lomax (Kirsty-Leigh Porter).
