= Dilly Harcourt =

Fictional character from Hollyoaks

- Hollyoaks character
- Portrayed by: Emma Johnsey-Smith
- Duration: 2023–2025
- First appearance: 14 July 2023
- Last appearance: 13 January 2025
- Introduced by: Lucy Allan
In-universe information
- Other names: Cordelia Blake
- Occupation: Businesswoman (until 2024)
- Father: Patrick Blake
- Mother: Margaret Williams
- Stepmother: Anna Blake; Maxine Minniver
- Half-sisters: Minnie Minniver
- Husband: Rafe Harcourt (until 2024)
- Grandfathers: Charles Blake
- Grandmothers: Martha Blake
- Uncles: Jeremy Blake
- First cousins: Sienna Blake; Dodger Savage
- Other relatives: Victoria Blake; Nico Blake; Myra-Pocahontas Savage-McQueen; Sophie Blake; Sebastian Blake

Cordelia "Dilly" Harcourt is a fictional character is a fictional character from the British soap opera Hollyoaks, played by Emma Johnsey-Smith. She made her first appearance during the episode broadcast on 14 July 2023. Her casting was announced on 30 June 2023. Executive producer, Lucy Allan revealed that Dilly's introduction would explore her plans to "destroy" Sienna Blake (Anna Passey). Dilly is initially introduced as the sister of Rafe Harcourt (Chris Gordon) who grows suspicious of Sienna's intentions with her "brother", believing her to be a gold-digger after the family fortune. She was later to be revealed as Rafe's wife, and the pair were set to ruin Sienna's life, but a reasoning behind as to why was left unrevealed. The character was then devised in a plot-twist as the estranged daughter of the deceased Patrick Blake (Jeremy Sheffield) who he abandoned during her early childhood in favour of Sienna – the reasoning behind her life-long vendetta.

Since Dilly's debut in the serial, her storylines have included and focused on pretending Rafe her brother to incite her wicked revenge on her later revealed half-sister Sienna Blake (Anna Passey), her relationships with Rafe, Ethan Williams (Matthew James-Bailey) and Prince McQueen (Malique Thompson-Dwyer), being accused of killing Rafe, her rampage after being revealed as the late daughter of Patrick Blake (Jeremy Sheffield); even envisioning him whilst breaking into the school, inciting a bond with Sienna and Liberty Savage (Jessamy Stoddart) after accidentally attacking Liberty and attempting to destroy Sienna, being caught up in a shooting that Warren Fox (Jamie Lomas) arranged; going wrong with Maxine Minniver (Nikki Sanderson) shooting Murphy (Rick S. Carr) attending along with Ste Hay (Kieron Richardson) and her connection to the deaths of Lizzie Chen-Williams (Lily Best) and Hunter McQueen (Theo Graham).

== Casting ==
The character and casting was announced on 30 June 2023. Almost no information of Dilly's character was given to viewers apart from being heavily involved with Sienna Blake (Anna Passey) and Ethan Williams (Matthew James-Bailey). Speaking about her casting, Johnsey-Smith said, "I'm very excited to have joined the cast of Hollyoaks. My time on the show so far has been great and all the cast and crew have been super welcoming. Dilly is fiery, quick-witted and a force to be reckoned with. Her kamikaze-like nature sees her in many a chaotic moment but deep down, there is a real vulnerable side that I'm excited for the audience to see."

== Development ==
=== Sienna Blake and paternity reveal ===
Dilly arrives with a clear hatred for Sienna Blake (Anna Passey). Dilly plots against and sabotages Sienna as she can no longer handle her hatred. Fans often speculated whether there was going to be a major plot-twist that Dilly would somehow be related to Sienna or a member of her family. It was later announced that Dilly is the long-lost daughter of deceased character Patrick Blake (Jeremy Sheffield). Patrick abandoned Dilly when her mother, Margaret, discovers Patrick's double life and gave Patrick an ultimatum whether to stay with their current family and not administer contact with Sienna, Dodger Savage (Danny Mac) and Anna Blake (Saskia Wickham) or to leave her and Dilly. He chose Sienna, which led to Dilly having a life-long rage targeting Sienna for her father not choosing her. It was all revealed in episode 6304, originally broadcast on 6 February 2024. Producers re-introduced Sheffield as Patrick as Dilly envisions him whilst breaking into the school. Dilly hit Sienna's half-sister Liberty Savage (Jessamy Stoddart) over the head with a blunt object in the basement at Harcourt Manor/Grove after Liberty finds her living underneath Sienna and her family, locking her in there in the process. This sparks fear in Sienna. Sienna questions Dilly and later unlocks the basement for Liberty. Whilst confronting Dilly, Sienna pushes her over an interior balcony; learning Dilly is her half-sister. Sienna swears to Liberty she will help Dilly, as not so long ago she was in the same position. As Sienna is scammed out of £300,000 by James Nightingale (Gregory Finnegan), she assumes Dilly knew Rafe had nothing for their future, and bans her from Rafe's funeral.

The plot-twist paternity storyline was revisited later on in 2024 following the introduction of Patrick's estranged mother Martha Blake (Sherrie Hewson) and Jez Blake (Sheffield). Teasing the upcoming plot, executive producer Hannah Cheers stated: "To be a Blake, you must be clever, captivating and charming on the outside... and calculating, cold and cynical on the inside, with a family dynasty so rich in history, it should come as no surprise that there are still many secrets to be uncovered. But for Sienna, Dilly, Liberty and Maxine, what happens next is not what anyone could have expected...". Johnsey-Smith expressed her delight at working with both Sheffield and Hewson.

"Oh my goodness, it's such a hard question because it's really complex as a story, and it's not linear. I would say just for the audience – look out for clues because all will be revealed, and it might not be what it seems at first. It gets dark and gets sinister, in true Blake fashion."

— Johnsey-Smith when asked where she thought Dilly's storyline was heading (2024)

=== Relationships ===
Rafe is revealed to be suffering with a terminal illness. Dilly's final wish to Rafe is to destroy Sienna's life before he dies, to which he accepted. Rafe eventually falls in love with Sienna as the storyline progresses, much to Dilly's annoyance and the storyline's culmination plot was announced in early January 2024. After being initially introduced as siblings, it was revealed Rafe and Dilly are husband and wife. During Sienna and Rafe's wedding day, Rafe confesses his love for Sienna and Dilly then attacked Rafe in retaliation, clutching at straws to keep him still in love with her. Rafe died in episode 6288, originally broadcast on 15 January 2024. Dilly later goes on the run after being blamed for murdering Rafe, but she is later cleared when it is revealed he died of his terminal illness.

She begins a romance with Ethan Williams (Matthew James-Bailey) upon introduction but the romance is shortly lived. The romance is presumably rekindled and revisited as the pair have noted chemistry and Ethan helped her whilst she was on the run for the involvement surrounding Rafe's death. After piling pressure on Ethan, he later grows tired of Dilly.

In February 2024, the writers placed Dilly in another relationship as she embarks on a romance with Prince McQueen (Malique Thompson-Dwyer). They strike a bond whilst competing for a job in The Loft nightclub. They are both later hired and their romance is "heated up" in the spring trailer 2024. The trailer featured the both flirtatiously arguing with each other, which ends with the pair passionately kissing. Prince later cheats on Dilly after proposing to her whilst sleeping with his brothers fiancée Zoe Anderson (Garcia Brown). They later call the engagement off after admitting it was a drunken mistake – Zoe and Hunter stay engaged.

Dilly attends the wedding of Dave Chen-Williams (Dominic Power) and Cindy Cunningham (Stephanie Waring) in episode 6368, originally broadcast on 7 May 2024. Warren Fox (Jamie Lomas) has supplied dodgy ecstasy tablets. Dilly purchased them under the pretence that they had no harmful effect. The drugs soon get passed round, Dilly, Prince, Hunter McQueen (Theo Graham), Lizzie Chen-Williams (Lily Best) and unassumingly Zoe Anderson (Garcia Brown) consumed the drug. Lizzie dies during the wedding party and the grief-stricken group make a pact in the toilet to not say a word. They all agree however later that night, Hunter also dies unknowingly next to Prince. Whilst assuming Hunter was simply asleep, he started to confess about sleeping with Zoe behind his back, which was also featured in the spring trailer.

== Storylines ==
Sienna Blake (Anna Passey) spots Dilly taking the portrait of her and Rafe Harcourt (Chris Gordon)'s father out of Rafe's car and accused her of stealing from his car, injuring her in a struggle. Unimpressed by her brother's new lover, Dilly accused her of being a gold digger and rejected Sienna's attempts at friendship. In an attempt to get dirt on Sienna, she turned her attentions towards her supposedly-'ex' boyfriend Ethan Williams (Matthew James-Bailey). However, Dilly ended up befriending Ethan (who was initially sour towards her), especially after confiding in him - following an incident with Donna-Marie Quinn (Lucy-Jo Hudson) - that she was a recovering drug addict. Despite keeping her secret from Sienna, Sienna ended up finding out the truth and planted cocaine in Rafe's car in order to get Dilly sent back to rehab. Dilly returned, initially exhibiting some animosity towards Rafe and finding comfort in Ethan. Ethan and Dilly grew closer as Sienna and Ethan's secret relationship broke down, but Ethan repeatedly disappointed Dilly by refusing to progress further than a 'fling'. Combined with her struggles over Rafe's terminal illness, Dilly drunkenly invited Rafe's ex-girlfriend Camilla Bassington-Hart (Dylan Morris) to the village. Sienna and Camilla both fought for Rafe, but Rafe proposed to Camilla at the Masquerade Ball, leaving Sienna humiliated. Rafe proposed to Sienna at the same time as Ethan and Sienna chose Rafe. Dilly and Rafe paid Camilla and sent her away: Camilla was, in fact, a hired actress and Dilly and Rafe were husband and wife with a revenge plot against Sienna. In the lead-up towards the wedding, Dilly drove the revenge campaign and attempted to sabotage Sienna's friendships with Maxine Minniver (Nikki Sanderson) and Ste Hay (Kieron Richardson), only briefly succeeding until the final weeks before the big day.

On the day of the wedding, Rafe changes his mind and plans to cancel the event, so Dilly strikes him with a bell and hid him in the basement, telling Sienna that Rafe had run away. Upon returning to the basement, Dilly was distraught to discover that Rafe had died and moved his body to the sofa, tucking him in with a blanket. Sienna later found Dilly's locket necklace with a photo of Patrick Blake inside, but Dilly claimed it was a wedding present for Sienna.

It was revealed that Dilly was in fact the half sister of Sienna, and was the late daughter of Patrick Blake (Jeremy Sheffield) after he abandoned her and her mother Margaret Williams after she found out about his double life. He chose Sienna and his family, leading to Dilly having an underlying hatred for Sienna for years. Dilly is pushed off a Balcony by Sienna whilst being confronted and Liberty Savage (Jessamy Stoddart) reveals to Sienna that she is her sister. She then tries to incite a relationship with much younger half-sister Minnie Minniver (Ava Lorente) but Minnie calls the police under Maxine's orders, allowing Dilly to escape to the school.

Sienna obtains a confession from Warren Fox (Jamie Lomas) that explains the truth about Ste Hay (Kieron Richardson)'s attack. Warren left Ste to die after pushing him off a building and is making Ste suffer in retaliation for Ste accidentally killing daughter Ella Richardson (Erin Palmer). He forces Ste, along with Murphy (Rick S. Carr), to threaten Sienna whilst she is having a girls night in with Dilly, Liberty and Maxine Minniver (Nikki Sanderson). Maxine shot Murphy after he attacks Dilly and he is later found by Dilly whilst she is on a run. Maxine calls an ambulance for him much to the annoyance of the group.

She attends the wedding of Dave Chen-Williams (Dominic Power) and Cindy Cunningham (Stephanie Waring). She buys dodgy ecstasy tablets for the wedding party. She later passes the drugs round to Prince McQueen (Malique Thompson-Dwyer), Hunter McQueen (Theo Graham), Lizzie Chen-Williams (Lily Best) and Zoe Anderson (Garcia Brown). They all consume the drug and are initially enjoying their time. Lizzie subsequently dropped to the floor whilst dancing with Dave, and the group watch as she died instantly. A panic-stricken Dilly, Prince, Hunter and Zoe then are overheard by Lizzie's adoptive brother Mason Chen-Williams (Frank Kauer) discussing the events in disbelief. They later make a pact to "protect" themselves as they believe Lizzie would have wanted that – Hunter dies the same night. Zoe admitted to Hunter previously she did not take the pill. A grief-stricken Prince enforces Dilly to set up a meeting with the dealer who supplied the drug to her; she intervenes as Prince instantly attacks him.

Prince and Dilly began an affair behind Zoe's back, much to the disapprovement of her family. When Sienna chastises Dilly about it, they argued and in the heat of the moment, Sienna admitted that she killed Ethan. A devastated Dilly started to pack her bags to start a new life with Prince, but Jez caught her and asked why she was leaving. She then told Jez that Sienna killed Ethan, however, his cold reaction and showing her Ethan's photo as well as his 'collection' in his book made her realise that he knew about it. Dilly, fearing for her life, tried to escape, but Jez locked her in the flat and strangled her with Martha's apron strings, killing her. The following day, Jez showed Sienna her dead body in a picnic basket, much to her horror, and asked her to help bury her. A horrified Sienna had no choice but to help him and they buried her in Jez's allotment.

== Reception ==
The twist of being Rafe's wife and Patrick's daughter led her to being nominated for "Best Twist" in the Radio Times soap awards 2024. Sarah Ellis from Inside Soap wrote that she could sense "menace" behind Dilly's manners, and joked that Dilly could be the one to tie Sienna to a radiator this time.
