= Chris Gordon (actor) =

British actor

- Occupation: Actor
- Years active: 2013–present
- Television: The Crown; Hollyoaks

Chris Gordon is a British actor. He portrayed the Duke of Edinburgh's valet in the first two seasons of The Crown (2016–17) and had a recurring role on Casualty as Ross West between 2018 and 2021, having previously guest-starred as another character on the series in 2014. Gordon portrayed the regular role of Rafe Harcourt on the soap opera Hollyoaks from 2023 to 2024. Gordon has also guest-starred in various other television series, including Stella (2013), Father Brown (2017), Silent Witness (2017), Vera (2017) and Masters of the Air (2014), as well as appearing in the second series of Bang (2020) and the 2022 docudrama U-Boat War Gamers. He has also appeared in the 2021 films Infinite and The Feast, as well as voicing a character in the 2024 video game Dragon Age: The Veilguard.

== Career ==
In 2013, Gordon appeared in an episode of the second series of the comedy Stella. The following year, he had a guest role in "Learning to Fly", the premiere episode of the 29th series of the medical drama television series Casualty. He later returned to Casualty playing a different character, drug dealer Ross West, the son of established character Jan Jenning (Di Botcher), as a recurring role between 2018 and 2021. Gordon portrayed the Duke of Edinburgh's valet played in Seasons 1 and 2 of the historical drama The Crown. Gordon had a guest role in a 2017 episode of Father Brown as part of its fifth season. That same month, he played Frankie McAteer in two episodes of Silent Witness – the two parts of "Covenant" – which aired on 23 and 24 January 2017 as part of its 20th series. That same year, Gordon also had a guest appearance in the third episode of the seventh series of the crime drama Vera. Gordon played Richie Campbell in the second series of the British bilingual television crime drama series Bang. Gordon also played a worker in the 2021 Welsh folk horror film The Feast. Additionally, he also had a role in the 2021 film Infinite and appeared in the 2024 American war drama miniseries Masters of the Air. Gordon portrayed German naval officer Otto Kretschmer in the docudrama television series U-Boat War Gamers, which was broadcast in 2022. He also voiced the character of General Felessan in the 2024 video game Dragon Age: The Veilguard. Additionally, Gordon has appeared in the television series Deep Space 69.

In March 2023, it was announced that Gordon had joined the cast of the British soap opera Hollyoaks as new regular character Rafe Harcourt. Speaking of his casting, Gordon said, "Joining the team at Hollyoaks feels a bit like meeting the family of a partner you really like – a little bit intimidating, but also very fulfilling. There's a real closeness throughout the departments and I've been welcomed into the fold with grace". It was teased that Rafe would form a bond with established character Sienna Blake (Anna Passey), with Gordon teasing that there would be "fireworks". Gordon enjoyed working with Passey, whilst she called him a "dream" to work with, commenting, "We are so excited to have Chris join the cast. He is a wonderful actor, and is bringing something completely new to the village with Rafe". Gordon's debut as Rafe originally aired on 9 May 2023. During Gordon's time on the soap, Rafe's storylines included being pursued by Sienna in an attempt to take his fortune, the introduction of his "sister" Dilly Harcourt (Emma Johnsey-Smith), who reveals that he is dying, developing a romance with Sienna, falling in love with Sienna despite initially being part of Dilly's plan to destroy her and being revealed to be Dilly's husband rather than brother. Gordon was also part of a storyline which was filmed on location at Arley Hall. Gordon later exited the role after Rafe was seemingly killed by Dilly, although it was later revealed that his death was because of his brain tumour. His final appearance aired on 16 January 2024.

== Filmography ==
Year	Title	Role	Notes	Ref.
—N/a	Deep Space 69	—N/a	Television series	
2013	Stella	Gethin	1 episode (Series 2, Episode 6)	
2014	Casualty	Liam Colver	1 episode ("Learning to Fly"), series 29	
2016–17	The Crown	Duke of Edinburgh's valet	Season 1 and 2	
2017	Father Brown	Jeb Cornish	1 episode ("The Chedworth Cyclone")	
2017	Silent Witness	Frankie McAteer	2 episodes ("Covenant, Part 1" and "Covenant, Part 2")	
2017	Vera	Rory Marston	1 episode ("Broken Promise")	
2018–21	Casualty	Ross West	Recurring role	
2020	Bang	Richie Campbell	Season 2	
2021	The Feast	Worker	Welsh folk horror film	
2021	Infinite	C17 pilot	Action science fiction film	
2022	U-Boat War Gamers	Otto Kretschmer	Docudrama television series	
2023–24	Hollyoaks	Rafe Harcourt	Regular role	
2024	Masters of the Air	Landing Officer	1 episode (Season 1, Episode 1)	
2024	Dragon Age: The Veilguard	General Felessan	Video game	
2027	The Popinjay Cavalier	TBA	Play	
