= Annabelle Davis =

British actress (born 1997)

- Born: 28 March 1997 (age 29); Peterborough, England
- Education: Sawtry Village Academy
- Occupation: Actress
- Years active: 2011–present
- Height: 104 cm (3 ft 5 in)
- Parents: Warwick Davis (father); Samantha Davis (mother)
- Relatives: Peter Burroughs (grandfather)

Annabelle Davis (born 28 March 1997) is a British actress. She portrayed Sasha Bellman in the CBBC series The Dumping Ground from 2015 to 2022, and in 2023, she began to play Lacey Lloyd in the Channel 4 soap opera Hollyoaks. She is the daughter of Warwick Davis and Samantha Davis.

== Early life and education ==
Davis is the only daughter of Samantha Davis (née Burroughs) and actor Warwick Davis. She has a younger brother, born in 2003. She also had an older brother Lloyd, who died in infancy at nine days old. Davis inherited spondyloepiphyseal dysplasia congenita from her father.

Davis attended Sawtry Village Academy, where she took A-Levels in Media, Textiles, Art and IT. In June 2018, she was announced as a patron for the Young People Counselling Service. She is the namesake of their first community hub.

== Career ==
In 2011, Davis appeared in Harry Potter and the Deathly Hallows – Part 2 as a Naughty Goblin. She then joined the CBBC series The Dumping Ground as Sasha Bellman in 2015. She reprised the role of Sasha in spin-off series The Dumping Ground: I'm..., a webisode series. She has also appeared in two Star Wars films alongside her father. In 2022, Davis joined the cast of the Disney+ series Willow, a sequel to the 1988 film of the same name, as Mims, the daughter of the titular character played by Davis' father. After the series was cancelled in March 2023, Davis said the show "was the most magical adventure." The series was later removed from Disney+ on 26 May 2023. After her final appearance on The Dumping Ground had aired in 2022, it was announced that Davis had been cast as Lacey Lloyd in the Channel 4 soap opera Hollyoaks. She made her debut appearance in 2023.

== Filmography ==
Film

Year	Title	Role	Notes
2011	Harry Potter and the Deathly Hallows – Part 2	Naughty Goblin	Uncredited role
2013	Jack the Giant Slayer	Extra	Uncredited role
2015	Modern Times	Herself	
2015	Piers Morgan's Life Stories	Herself	
2015	Star Wars: The Force Awakens	Creature Performer	
2017	Star Wars: The Last Jedi	Dodibin	
2022	Octopus (short)	Mini	

Television

Year	Title	Role	Notes
2015–2022	The Dumping Ground	Sasha Bellman	Main role (seasons 3–9)
2016–2021	The Dumping Ground: I'm...	Sasha Bellman	Main role
2017–2018, 2022	Saturday Mash-Up!	Herself	4 episodes
2022–2023	Willow	Mims Ufgood	2 episodes
2023–2024	Hollyoaks	Lacey Lloyd	70 episodes
2023	The Witcher	Warrior Walking with Pitch Pork	Episode: "Shaerrawedd"

== Awards and nominations ==
Year	Award	Category	Work	Result	Ref.
2018	Royal Television Society NTEB Awards 2018	Performance of the Year	The Dumping Ground	Won	
