= Samantha Davis =

British actress (1971–2024)

- Born: Samantha Burroughs; 30 January 1971
- Died: 24 March 2024 (aged 53)
- Citizenship: British
- Occupation: Actress
- Years active: 1988–2022
- Spouse: Warwick Davis (m. 1991)
- Children: 3, including Annabelle
- Father: Peter Burroughs

Samantha Davis (née Burroughs; 30 January 1971 – 24 March 2024) was a British actress and co-founder of the charity Little People U.K. She worked on films such as Labyrinth and Willow, where she met her husband Warwick Davis. Her father is actor Peter Burroughs.

== Personal life ==
She was born with achondroplasia, a hereditary genetic condition that results in dwarfism.

As a teenager she began to work as an extra on movie sets with her father Peter Burroughs. It was while working on the film Willow that she met her husband Warwick Davis though he already knew her from the set of Labyrinth which they had both worked on a few years prior. In 1988, the same year they met on Willow, the two were in a play together at the Cambridge Arts Centre and began dating. They dated for three years and were married in 1991.

Their first child together died shortly after birth due to complications from inheriting both the genetic conditions that cause dwarfism from each parent (achondroplasia and SED).

The couple went on to have two other children together, Annabelle and Harrison, who like their parents have both acted in film and television and like their father have Spondyloepiphyseal dysplasia congenita, a genetic condition that causes dwarfism.

=== Death ===
In 2019, Davis faced a life-threatening case of sepsis due to complications from surgery and received treatment in hospital. She died of illness in 2024.

== Career ==
Davis appeared as an extra in many films, mostly uncredited. She worked on the film Labyrinth with her father Peter Burroughs and she had an uncredited role as a Nelwyn villager in Willow, a role she reprised (again uncredited) in the revival TV series for Disney+. She also appeared as a goblin in Harry Potter and the Deathly Hallows: Part 2 and in the educational BBC show Through the Dragon's Eye in 1989.

== Charity work ==
Samantha Davis co-founded Little People UK in 2012 with husband Warwick Davis. The purpose of the charity was to help people with dwarfism in the United Kingdom. It connects people with dwarfism to each other through events as well to educational and medical resources. One component is an annual convention where hundreds of people with dwarfism meet. The charity often helps children with dwarfism feel less isolated, connect with people, and gain more self-confidence.

== Filmography ==
- Labyrinth (1986)
- Willow (1988)
- Leprechaun 2 (1994)
- Harry Potter and the Deathly Hallows: Part 2 (2011)

== TV ==
- Honky Sausages (1999) 1 episode
- Through the Dragon's Eye (1989) 3 episodes
- Willow (2022) (uncredited)
