= Owen Warner =

English actor (born 1999)

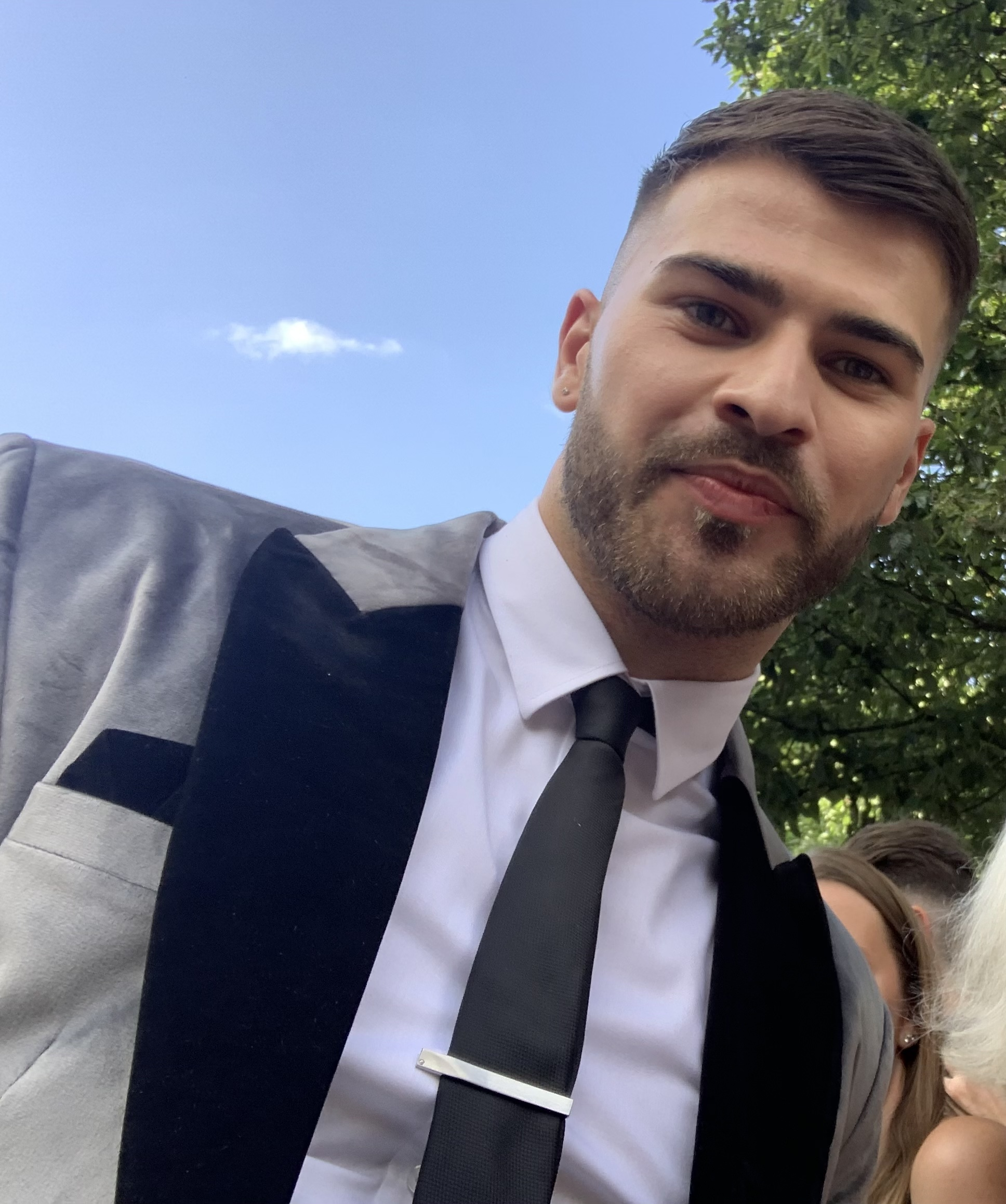
- Warner in 2022
- Born: Owen David Warner; 8 June 1999 (age 27); Leicester, England
- Education: Gartree High School; Brooksby Melton College
- Occupations: Actor; radio presenter
- Years active: 2015–present
- Television: Hollyoaks (2018–2024); I'm a Celebrity...Get Me Out of Here (2022)
- Partner(s): Stephanie Davis (2018–2019); Jemma Donovan (2023–2025)

Owen David Warner (born 8 June 1999) is an English actor. He is known for portraying the role of Romeo Nightingale in the Channel 4 soap opera Hollyoaks. For his portrayal of Romeo, Warner won the Digital Spy Reader Award for Best Soap Newcomer in 2018. In November 2022, Warner appeared as a contestant on the 22nd UK series of I'm a Celebrity...Get Me Out of Here! finishing in second place.

== Early life ==
Warner was born on 8 June 1999 in Leicester, and attended Gartree High School, The Beauchamp College in Oadby, Leicester for GCSEs, before going on to study performing arts at SMB College Group's Melton Campus, formerly Brooksby Melton College, completing his studies in July 2017. He has two older brothers. Warner further studied acting at Urban Young Actors, Leicester, and the Actors Workshop Nottingham. He later returned to the city to raise money for the Nottingham-based charity Footprints Conductive Education Centre, where he participated in a charity football match.

== Career ==
=== Television ===
Warner made his acting debut as Trev in the short film Beverley in 2015. In July 2018, he appeared as Raver in the short film 20th Century Tribe.

Warner then joined the cast of the Channel 4 soap opera Hollyoaks. His character, Romeo Nightingale, was introduced as the long-lost son of established character James (Gregory Finnegan), arriving alongside his mother Donna-Marie Quinn (Lucy-Jo Hudson). His storylines on the show have included building a relationship with his father and has seen the introduction of the character's sister and auntie Juliet Nightingale (Niamh Blackshaw).

For his portrayal of the character, Warner won the award for Best Soap Newcomer at the 2018 Digital Spy Reader Awards. Warner has also made guest appearances on I'm a Celebrity: Extra Camp and Eating with My Ex, in support of his friend and Hollyoaks co-star Malique Thompson-Dwyer.

In November 2022, Warner appeared as a contestant on the 22nd series of the British reality television show I'm a Celebrity... Get Me Out of Here! and reached the final, eventually placing second.

In January 2024, Warner announced his decision to quit Hollyoaks to pursue other projects, with the door left open for Warner to return to the show in the future.

=== Radio ===
In 2023, Warner was announced, initially as a cover presenter, to be hosting on Hits Radio in place of Sam Thompson, however he later would go on to present Saturday Night Hits on Hits Radio, a lead in to the Stephanie Hirst Belters show.

== Personal life ==
Warner was in a relationship with his co-star Stephanie Davis between 2018 and 2019, and was later linked with Geordie Shore star Chloe Ferry, The Apprentice 14 runner-up Camilla Ainsworth, and Love Island 9 runner-up Lana Jenkins. From April 2023 to June 2025, Warner was in a relationship with his co-star Jemma Donovan, who portrayed his on-screen girlfriend Rayne Royce in Hollyoaks.

== Filmography ==
| Year | Title | Role | Notes | Ref(s) |
|---|---|---|---|---|
| 2015 | Beverley | Trev | Short film | |
| 2018 | 20th Century Tribe | Raver | Short film | |
| 2018–2024 | Hollyoaks | Romeo Nightingale | Regular role | |
| 2018 | I'm a Celebrity: Extra Camp | Himself | 1 episode | |
| 2022 | Eating with My Ex | Himself | 1 episode | |
| 2022 | I'm a Celebrity...Get Me Out of Here! | Himself | Main role (season 22) | |
| 2026 | Spider Island | Kevin | | |

== Awards and nominations ==
| Year | Award | Category | Work | Result | Ref(s) |
|---|---|---|---|---|---|
| 2018 | Digital Spy Reader Awards | Best Newcomer | Hollyoaks | Won | |
| 2023 | The British Soap Awards | Best Leading Performer | Hollyoaks | Longlisted | |
