= Peter Burroughs =

British actor (born 1947)

- Born: 27 January 1947 (age 79); Peterborough, England
- Occupation: Actor
- Height: 4 ft 5 in (135 cm)
- Children: 2, including Samantha Davis
- Relatives: Warwick Davis (son-in-law); Annabelle Davis (granddaughter)

Peter Burroughs (born 27 January 1947) is a British television and film actor and the director of Willow Management. He is the father-in-law of actor and TV presenter Warwick Davis.

== Early career ==
Burroughs initially ran a shop in his village at Yaxley, Cambridgeshire.

His first dramatic role was Branic in the 1979 television series The Legend of King Arthur. He also acted in the television shows Dick Turpin, The Goodies, Doctor Who, serial The King's Demons and One Foot in the Grave.

== Film career ==
Burroughs played roles in Hollywood movies such as Flash Gordon, George Lucas' Star Wars: Episode VI – Return of the Jedi (a swinging ewok), Willow, The Dark Crystal, Labyrinth and The Hitchhiker's Guide to the Galaxy. He portrayed a bank goblin in the Harry Potter series (Harry Potter and the Philosopher's Stone and Harry Potter and the Deathly Hallows – Part 2). In 1995, Burroughs set up Willow Management, an agency for short actors, along with co-actor Warwick Davis.

== Personal life ==
His daughter Samantha (1971–2024) was married to Star Wars: Episode VI – Return of the Jedi and Willow film star Warwick Davis. He has another daughter, Hayley Burroughs, who is also an actress. His granddaughter is Annabelle Davis.

== Filmography ==
Year	Title	Role	Notes
1980	Flash Gordon	Dwarf #8	
1982	The Dark Crystal	Additional Performer	
1983	Return of the Jedi	Ewok #12	
1986	Labyrinth	Goblin Corps	
1988	Willow	Nelwyn Villager	Uncredited
2000	The Best of Blur	Milk Carton	Coffee & TV video
2001	Harry Potter and the Philosopher's Stone	Goblin	Uncredited
2005	The Hitchhiker's Guide to the Galaxy	Marvin	Uncredited
2011	Harry Potter and the Deathly Hallows – Part 2	Goblin	Uncredited, (final film role)

=== Television ===
Year	Title	Role	Notes
1979	The Legend of King Arthur	Branic	Episodes 2 to 7
1980	BBC Television Shakespeare	Player	Hamlet, Prince of Denmark
1980–1981	The Talisman	Nectobanus	BBC miniseries, based upon Sir Walter Scott's The Talisman (Scott novel).
1981	Dick Turpin	Choir Boy	Episode: Dick Turpin's Greatest Adventure: Part 4
1981	Into the Labyrinth	Rutan	Episode: The Calling
1981	The Goodies	Dwarf	Episode: Special: Snow White 2
1983	Doctor Who	Jester	Episode: The King's Demons: Part One
1986	Help!	Eric	Episode: Mary, Mary...
1990	One Foot in the Grave	Rusty	Episode: Love and Death
1999	Blur: Coffee & TV	Milk carton	Miusic video
2000	The 10th Kingdom	Dwarf	Episods: 1.8
