= Sawtry Village Academy =

Location
- Fen Lane; Sawtry, Cambridgeshire, PE28 5TQ; England; 52.4367°N 0.2796°W

Information
- Type: Academy
- Established: 1960s
- Local authority: Cambridgeshire
- Department for Education URN: 136974 Tables
- Ofsted: Reports
- Principal: Simon Parsons
- Gender: Mixed
- Age: 11 to 18
- Enrolment: 1,202 as of January 2016
- Houses: Norman; Archers; Saints; Ermine; Oak
- Colours: Navy Blue & Gold
- Website: http://www.sawtryva.org/

Sawtry Village Academy (formerly Sawtry Community College and Sawtry Village College) is a co-education secondary school and sixth form located in the village of Sawtry, Cambridgeshire a short distance from Peterborough. It opened in 1963.

Sawtry Community College converted to academy status in April 2015 and was renamed Sawtry Village Academy. The school is now part of the Meridian Trust (previously the Cambridge Meridian Academies Trust).

== History ==
Sawtry Village College first opened in 1963. It was one of a number of colleges based on Henry Morris' idea that educational institutions should serve their communities by becoming a central hub for the area as well as a school. In practice, this meant that during the day the College taught secondary school age pupils but was used by the community for other events outside of this time.

In 2014, prior principal James Stewart left the school in summer 2014 after a critical Ofsted report, and was subsequently arrested over allegations of fraud. In October 2017, Stewart was convicted of four counts of fraud and one of misconduct in a public office. Stewart used £85,000 of school funds to pay off personal debts, £6,000 of school funds to cover household bills, and aided and abetted vice-principal Alan Stevens to commit fraud. During the trial, the court heard that Stewart would routinely lock himself in his office—which he refurbished at the expense of the school which cost thousands of pounds—where he had "a private phone line installed to place bets with bookmaker William Hill, and [would] watch horse racing on TV." His office also contained sex toys, condoms, lubricants and alcohol. Stewart was sentenced to 4 years imprisonment by Mr Justice Stuart Bridge at Huntingdon Law Courts. In February 2019, Simon Parsons was appointed Head teacher of Sawtry Village Academy after the previous principal, Sarah Wilson, was appointed as CMAT Executive Principal.

== Management ==
The current principal is Simon Parsons.

== Collections ==
The Institute of Education, University College London holds the papers of Maurice Dybeck, who was the Principal at Sawtry Village College from its opening in 1963 until 1984. The collection contains material relating to both the Village College and the wider community of Sawtry.
