= Jemma Donovan =

British-Australian actress and singer (born 2000)

- Born: Jemma Donovan; 28 March 2000 (age 26); London, England, United Kingdom
- Occupations: Actress, singer
- Years active: 2010–present
- Partner: Owen Warner (2023–2025)
- Father: Jason Donovan
- Relatives: Terence Donovan (grandfather); Sue McIntosh (grandmother); Stephanie McIntosh (aunt)

Jemma Donovan (born 28 March 2000) is a British-Australian actress and singer. She made her role acting debut in the BBC One television film Mr Stink when she was 12 years old. In 2015, Donovan played Maddy Bastière in the French-American series Spotless. After relocating to Australia, Donovan joined the regular cast of Neighbours as Harlow Robinson. Three members of her family had previously starred in the soap opera, including her father Jason Donovan. She made her debut in July 2019 and also appeared in the spin-off series Neighbours: Erinsborough High. She left the serial in July 2022. Shortly after moving back to the United Kingdom, Donovan secured the role of "party girl" Rayne Royce in the Channel 4 soap opera Hollyoaks.

== Early life ==
Donovan was born and raised in London, England. She is the daughter of actor and singer Jason Donovan and his wife Angela Malloch. She has a younger brother and sister. Her grandfather was actor Terence Donovan and her grandmother is actress and presenter Sue McIntosh. Her aunt Stephanie McIntosh is also an actor and singer. Donovan realised she wanted to pursue a career in the entertainment industry while she was in school. She began attending drama classes when she was 10 years old.

== Career ==
Donovan was 12 years old when she played Pippa in the BBC One television film adaptation of the David Walliams children's book Mr Stink. Donovan said working on the film made her fall in love with acting. In 2015, Donovan played Maddy Bastière in the French-American dark comedy-drama series Spotless, which was distributed by Netflix internationally. She spent six months filming the series and she called it one of the best experiences of her life, as it taught her a lot about the industry. She admitted that she did not want to go back to school afterwards. Donovan relocated to Australia in 2018, where she went on a number of auditions arranged by her father's agent, including for Home and Away.

Donovan's final audition was for the long-running soap opera Neighbours. Her father, grandfather, and aunt had all previously starred in the serial. She originally auditioned for the role of Roxy Willis, but producers felt she was not right for the part and it eventually went to Zima Anderson. Donovan was also unsure about being able to portray Roxy having read the "raunchy" scripts. Producers later created the character of Harlow Robinson and Donovan was cast in the role. Harlow's storyline resembled Donovan's own move from the UK to Australia. Of joining the cast, Donovan commented "I am so happy and very honoured to be a part of a series which has been enjoyed by generations. I really like my character Harlow. She is very headstrong, and I enjoy playing that type of character, who's not so intense, knows what she is doing and likes to get involved and Harlow seems to have those qualities." Donovan later admitted that she had not watched the show before she was cast. She made her debut as Harlow in July 2019. That same year, she also appeared in the spin-off series Neighbours: Erinsborough High. In 2021, Donovan returned to the UK to film a special storyline for her character, alongside Amanda Holden. Donovan's departure from Neighbours was confirmed in May 2022. She returned to the UK permanently after filming her final scenes, which were broadcast that July.

In October 2022, Donovan joined the main cast of British soap opera Hollyoaks as Rayne Royce. Donovan's character was part of a new group of 20-somethings living in a share house, which harks back to the serial's student-focused earlier years. Rayne was billed as a "party girl" and "a social media sensation." Of her casting, Donovan stated "I am thrilled to be joining the cast of Hollyoaks! I'm so grateful for this opportunity to be able to bring something unique and fun to a new role and I can't wait to be a part of the Hollyoaks family." Donovan made her first appearance on 17 January 2023. On 13 September 2023, it was announced that the character would be murdered as part of a whodunit storyline with her final scenes airing on 26 September 2023.

In 2025, Donovan has been singing backing vocals for Take That's Gary Barlow's The Songbook Tour across the UK & Ireland.

== Filmography ==
Year	Title	Role	Notes
2012	Mr Stink	Pippa	Television film
2015	Spotless	Maddy Bastière	Main role
2019–2022	Neighbours	Harlow Robinson	374 episodes
2019	Neighbours: Erinsborough High	Harlow Robinson	Main role
2023–2024	Hollyoaks	Rayne Royce	86 episodes
2026	Jimmy	Ginger Rogers	

== Awards and nominations ==
Year	Award	Category	Nominated work	Result	Ref.
2023	National Television Awards	Rising Star	Hollyoaks	Nominated	
2023	Inside Soap Awards	Best Newcomer	Hollyoaks	Nominated	
