= Gregory Finnegan =

British actor

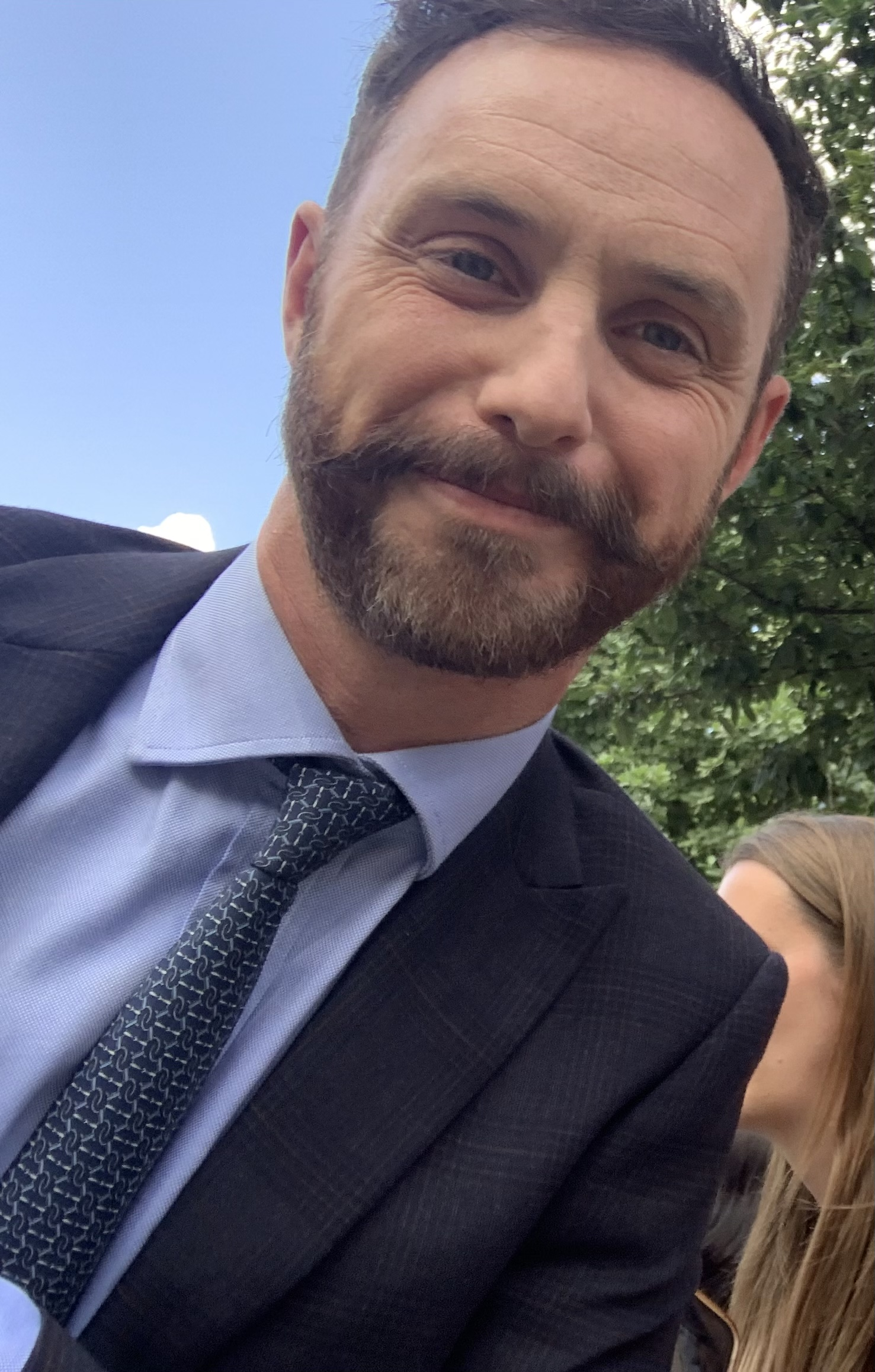
- Finnegan in 2022
- Born: Denmark
- Occupation: Actor
- Years active: 2002–present
- Known for: Role of James Nightingale in Hollyoaks
- Spouse: Ariana Fraval (m. 2011)
- Children: 3

Gregory Finnegan is a British actor. He is best known for his roles as Dr Alex Arnott in EastEnders and as James Nightingale in Hollyoaks.

== Career ==
Finnegan studied at the Webber Douglas Academy of Dramatic Art. His first television acting role was as Gabriel Brennan on the Sky One drama Is Harry on the Boat?. He later appeared in the film Winter Solstice and on the Channel 4 drama The Courtroom.

Finnegan also made appearances on Mile High, Agatha Christie: A Life in Pictures , the Crime drama The Last Detective as well as the BBC One show Spooks. Finnegan joined the cast of Family Affairs in 2005 as Nigel Dudley. Afterwards, he played the role of Terry in the short drama Fuse and in Blitz as a computer Geek. He played the role of Dr Alex Arnott for one episode of EastEnders, making an appearance on Doctors as Duncan Montague in 2011 and David Hewitt in 2012. Finnegan appeared in Valentine's Kiss as Henry Kendrick and as Owen Stanway in Casualty.

In January 2016, Finnegan joined the cast of Hollyoaks as James Nightingale. He was introduced as the lawyer of Cindy Cunningham (Stephanie Waring), before it was revealed that he was the son of Mac Nightingale (David Easter). Since his arrival, Finnegan's character James has been in a relationship with John Paul McQueen (James Sutton), involved in a love-triangle with characters Ste Hay (Kieron Richardson) and Harry Thompson (Parry Glasspool), as well as being involved in a historical abuse storyline with his father Mac. Finnegan was shortlisted for Best Actor at the 2017 British Soap Awards and was also long-listed for Best Actor and Bad Boy at the Inside Soap Awards the same year but did not make the shortlist In 2019, Finnegan won the British Soap Award for Best Actor for his role in Hollyoaks.
