= James Nightingale (Hollyoaks) =

Fictional character from Hollyoaks

- Hollyoaks character
- Portrayed by: Gregory Finnegan; David Perkins (2018 flashback)
- Duration: 2016–present
- First appearance: 12 January 2016
- Introduced by: Bryan Kirkwood (2016); Hannah Cheers (2025)
- Crossover appearances: Brookside (2025)
In-universe information
- Occupation: Lawyer; Businessman
- Father: Mac Nightingale
- Mother: Marnie Nightingale
- Brothers: Nathan Nightingale
- Sisters: Ellie Nightingale
- Half-brothers: Alfie Nightingale
- Half-sisters: Juliet Nightingale
- Husband: Ste Hay (2023–present)
- Sons: Romeo Nightingale
- Stepsons: Lucas Hay
- Stepdaughters: Leah Barnes (adoptive); Hannah Hay-O'Connor
- Grandmothers: Tabitha Maxwell-Brown

James Nightingale is a fictional character from the British soap opera Hollyoaks, played by Gregory Finnegan. The character made his first on-screen appearance on 12 January 2016. Finnegan's casting was announced in December 2015, and James was billed as a mysterious character and lawyer. His introduction to the show featured him attempting to convince Cindy Cunningham (Stephanie Waring) to take legal action against Mac Nightingale (David Easter), in a bid to secure his assets. Having kept the character's identity concealed, writers implemented a story twist in which James is revealed to be Mac's son. Lysette Anthony was cast to play his mother Marnie Nightingale, a character which James often featured alongside. Their on-screen partnership developed them into a trouble making and villainous duo. Writers played on their manipulative manner, with James managing to con the Hutchinson family out of their restaurant "The Hutch". Initially believed to have been killed in a car explosion in September 2024, James made an unannounced return on 15 October 2025, briefly appearing during the 30th anniversary week of Hollyoaks.

James' characterisation includes traits associated with villainy – blackmail, manipulation and scheming are usual tactics the character deploys. Finnegan has explained that James has a philosophy in which he has to always get what he wants. James is openly gay and his stories have intertwined with other characters identified as gay on the show. He manipulates Scott Drinkwell (Ross Adams) for personal gain and begins an affair with his boyfriend John Paul McQueen (James Sutton). He also feuds with Ste Hay (Kieron Richardson) and blackmails his boyfriend Harry Thompson (Parry Glasspool) into sleeping with him. It was revealed that his father, Mac used to regularly beat him when he was a child. James then later decides to help Mac's former fiancée, Neeta Kaur (Amrit Maghera), bankrupt Mac after Mac withdrew all of her money. Finnegan has defended his character's bad behaviour and writers pledged to explore his backstory to offer viewers an explanation behind his villainy. Critics of the genre have offered much debate on the character's questionable behaviour. He has been branded "machiavellian" and "sleazy" and left numerous critics in agreement that he is a "schemer". For his portrayal of James, Finnegan won the award for Best Actor at the 2019 British Soap Awards.

== Casting ==
The character and Finnegan's casting was announced on 24 December 2015. He was described as a mysterious character who would share scenes with many established characters appearing on the show. James was portrayed by David Perkins in a 2018 flashback episode.

== Development ==
=== Characterisation ===
There's a dastardly, delicious villain strutting the streets of Hollyoaks and he’s the scoundrel we'll all love to hate. James is the oldest of the Nightingale brood, but unlike his siblings his devilish charm and dedicated pursuit of power mean he is much more likely to sue a family-owned pub than run one. Oozing with confidence he owns any room he swaggers into, and creates chaos wherever he treads.

— An excerpt from James's biography on the Channel 4 website.

Finnegan has described James as a character who likes his own way. His philosophy is that should he see something he wants, then he will get it. James does not like romantic relationships and prefers to keep things more casual. The character is manipulative and scheming, something which adds fun to the role for Finnegan. Sarah Ellis from Inside Soap that he enjoys opening a script for the first time because he knows that James will be up to causing trouble. He added "he's always up to something, there's always an angle – and for me as an actor, that's brilliant." As James' time on-screen passes writers played him even more "rotten". Finnegan has said that his character is willing to "go to any lengths" to secure a victory over others.

Following six months in the role, Finnegan had learned to defend his character's questionable actions. He said that while James has done bad things writers had planned to explore why he behaves in such a manner. They wrote James' backstory with the inclusion of difficult times which influenced his manipulative behaviour. He believed that it would offer viewers understanding as to why James became a bad person. Finnegan added "he's cut-throat and happy to manipulate people, but I think it comes from a real place in his life when you discover the backstory."

=== Introduction ===
James works as a solicitor and in his first scenes he offers legal advice to Cindy about divorcing Mac. A Hollyoaks publicist said that James would cause "terrible trouble locally" upon arriving in the show and specifically target established character Cindy Cunningham (Stephanie Waring). Ste Hay (Kieron Richardson) and Harry Thompson (Parry Glasspool) will be confused as to why he spends time with Cindy as they rightly believe that James is gay. They added that secrets about James would later be revealed.

Waring described James as a suave and very mysterious man. She told Laura Morgan of All About Soap that James overhears Cindy talking to Tony Hutchinson (Nick Pickard) about committing bigamy and he offers her legal assistance. She views him as a handsome man and uses her sexuality to get what she wants, James' help to escape bigamy charges. Waring added "he's very alluring and dashing, so of course Cindy is immediately taken in by his knight-in-shining-armour routine." Sophie Dainty from Digital Spy reported that James would begin to target Mac Nightingale (David Easter) in a new scheme. He asks Cindy to cause trouble for Mac and attempt to gain control of his assets.

In January 2016, it was publicised that James is a member of the Nightingale family, a group of characters Hollyoaks introduced in October 2015. Lysette Anthony had been cast as the family matriarch Marnie Nightingale. It was revealed that James was working with Marnie to scheme against his own father, Mac. He then convinces Cindy to try and gain an equal share of Mac's pub, The Dog. She tries to gain leverage over Mac, but James' sister Ellie Nightingale (Sophie Porley) discovers false divorce documents and threatens Cindy with legal action.

The arrival of James and Marnie was done with the intention to introduce a darker side to the Nightingale family. Jared Garfield (who plays sibling Nathan Nightingale) told Digital Spy's Daniel Kilkelly that James and Marnie came in and had "really shaken things up". They brought new energy and a different dynamic to the family. He explained that the nasty personas of James and Marnie worked well against the "better-natured" remainder of the Nightingales. There is much resentment between James and his family but also there is some love and care included. Garfield added that the family relationship is "far more complicated than meets the eye" and James alongside Marnie can turn to their family when they are "really desperate and in need". Garfield later told an Inside Soap reporter that James and Marnie helped to explain the family history of the Nightingale.

=== Scamming the Hutchinson family ===
Writers devised a new scam storyline for the character during his second month on-screen. With the help of Marnie, James plans to con Tony (Nick Pickard) and Diane Hutchinson (Alex Fletcher) out of their restaurant, "The Hutch". Marnie asks Diane if she would consider selling the business to her, to which Diane refuses. This prompts Marnie to convince James to help steal it for themselves. Marnie sets off a fire alarm to disrupt the restaurant during peak trading and James steals Tony's laptop to scrutinise the business accounts. When Diane's nephew Scott Drinkwell (Ross Adams) causes The Hutch to lose money on a catering job, James and Marnie decide to use his error to their advantage. James begins to fool Scott into believing he is attracted to him in order to use Scott to undermine the business. His manipulation is successful and writers played Scott willing to do anything to impress the duo. Marnie then convinces Scott to set fire to The Hutch and claim the insurance money. She calls the police so Scott will get caught committing arson and in turn make Tony likely to sell. But John Paul McQueen (James Sutton) realises what is happening and helps Scott escape before they arrive.

As the plans involving Scott fail, James then decides to manipulate local gay couple Harry and Ste who have become homeless and financially broke. Harry is Tony's son and he decides to use him in his plot to take over The Hutch. James is attracted to the characters and comes up with a plan that will benefit both himself and Marnie. Finnegan told Ellis that his character is drawn to Harry more than Ste, he then employs his philosophy of getting exactly what he wants and begins to manipulate him. James uses "sneaky tactics" to undermine the relationship between Harry and Ste. He then sets up a scenario to get closer to Harry and invites him to his car for drinks and fast-food. Then James flirts with Harry and offers him ten thousand pounds in exchange for sex. But James' indecent proposal is not motivated by James wanting anything more from Harry. The actor explained that "for him it's as simple as: he's attracted to Harry, he wants him, and he's going to have him. That's how he rolls." Harry accepts James' offer and sleeps with him for the money. He later feels guilty and returns the money to James.

They eventually succeed in conning the restaurant from the Hutchinsons via blackmailing Harry. Marnie decides to re-brand the eatery as "Nightingales". Anthony told Sarah Ellis (Inside Soap) that her character genuinely believes she has done Diane and Tony a favour in buying them out. She thinks it would have gone into administration without her help, despite the fact she and James had caused most of the damage to the business. Harry asks James to give Tony and Diane jobs at Nightingales. Writers introduced another "twist" which saw James willing to help in exchange for more sex. This time Harry refuses the offer.

Harry decides to challenge James' scheming by creating his own fake kidnapping scam which could leave James in trouble with authorities. He gives Tony and Diane a job. Ste takes Harry's scam seriously and reports James to the police for kidnap. James is able to have the charges discredited with his legal skills. In retaliation James visits Ste and reveals the details of his indecent proposal and Harry's subsequent infidelity. Finnegan told Kilkelly from Digital Spy that his character was more than happy to get revenge by ruining their relationship. James believed Ste had crossed a line and he "doesn't have any qualms" about "ripping Ste and Harry's lives apart". The actor explained James' other motivation for splitting them up was his view that Harry could find a more suitable partner. He thinks that Ste has made poor life choices and wants Harry to gain more from life. On-screen Ste retaliates by attacking James for sleeping with his boyfriend. He behaves "utterly vindictive" towards Ste and says nasty things about Ste's life. Finnegan branded it a "heartbreaking" watch for fans of Ste. He added that he was relishing the opportunity to portray such a badly behaved character.

Ste and Harry were a popular partnership with viewers and sometimes referred to by the portmanteau "Starry". Despite this some viewers on social media contacted the actor voicing their support for a relationship between James and Harry. They even created their own couple name of "Jarry". Finnegan said "it's slightly perverse, but it's been quite funny." Glasspool thought the new fan-ship was "weird".

=== Affair with John Paul McQueen ===
Scott later enters into a relationship with John Paul. But when John Paul dumps Scott for keeping secrets, James immediately begins to pay John Paul attention and convinces him to spend the day with him. He then charms John Paul and they sleep together. Adams told Charlotte Tutton of OK! that he hoped Scott and John Paul could repair their relationship, but it would be difficult because James has turned his attentions to John Paul. The actor added that James' addition to their relationship throws a "cat amongst the pigeons". Sutton told Duncan Lindsay from Metro that James is a "strong and powerful" character. He wants John Paul and gains power over him because John Paul finds it hard to resist an attractive man. The actor added John Paul "feels like he wants to be around this dangerous and exciting character – but then you have poor Scott following him around like a lost puppy!"

James' ex-boyfriend Carter (Amron Adams) arrives in the village and asks James to join him for dinner to discuss him joining his new law firm. Carter informs him that his girlfriend Lara (Hannah Warren Green) will be there. In order to prove that he to has moved on James orders John Paul to pretend to be his boyfriend and attend the meal. He reminds John Paul that he owes him for giving Holly Cunningham (Amanda Clapham) free legal representation. John Paul cancels his plans with Scott to attend the lunch. He impresses James' friends and the meeting goes well. But Scott catches them and they argue publicly, embarrassing James. Rather than attempt to save his relationship, John Paul follows James home for an argument which leads to the pair sleeping together.

Hollyoaks writers also developed a friendship with fellow "dastardly" character Joanne Cardsley (Rachel Leskovac) during the storyline. James explains his intentions to snare John Paul from Scott and she reveals her plan to steal Mercedes McQueen's (Jennifer Metcalfe) fiancé Joe Roscoe (Ayden Callaghan). The two characters team up and place a bet on who can snare their potential love interests away from their partners first. Finnegan had previously worked alongside Leskovac on other projects. She told Sarah Ellis (Inside Soap) that Finnegan is a "phenomenal actor" who provokes better performances from her when they share scenes. She expressed her delight of the "brilliant" character pairing, adding "aside from the naughtiness, you'll be seeing a softer side to both characters." Finnegan told Charlotte Tutton from OK! magazine that James views the bet as a "good excuse" to pursue John Paul without having to acknowledge his true feelings. The prospect of a relationship with him terrifies James. John Paul is hit by a car and suffers from partial blindness. Finnegan said James is initially optimistic because he does not do "lost causes" and he believes he can "throw money at the problem". Marnie does not approve of the relationship and orders James' to end it. Finnegan assessed that his character was "stung" by Marnie's words. He trusts her most and her opinion "really shakes his confidence and judgement", causing him to abandon John Paul.

=== Historical abuse ===
The show developed a topical storyline focusing on historical physical abuse. It featured the revelation that James had been violently beaten as a child by his father Mac. The story debuted on-screen during September 2016, when James is accused of vandalising Mac and Neeta Kaur's (Amrit Maghera) wedding venue. An enraged Mac violently attacks James, which is witnessed by John Paul. James then confides in John Paul that Mac would often beat him in secret when he was a child. The show developed the storyline with the support of child welfare charity NSPCC. Peter Wanless from the organisation said that he hoped the "powerful and emotional storyline" featuring James would give people the confidence to seek support. He believed that all too often victims blamed themselves for the violence, but James' age would help to show that it is never too late to confront the issue. Wanless added that James' behaviour showed how abuse can affect people their entire lives.

== Reception ==
For his portrayal of James, Finnegan earned a nomination for Best Actor at the 2017 British Soap Awards. He was later longlisted for Best Actor and Best Bad Boy at the Inside Soap Awards. He did not progress to the viewer-voted shortlist. Finnegan was nominated for Best Soap Actor (Male) at the 2018 Digital Spy Reader Awards; he came in second place with 12.1% of the total vote. James' pairing with Harry was nominated under the "Best Soap Couple" category; it came in fifth place with 8.9% of the total vote. Additionally, James being framed for murder was nominated under the "Most Bizarre Soap Storyline" category; it came in fifth place with 11.5% of the total vote. Finnegan won the "Best Actor" accolade at the 2019 British Soap Awards.

An Soaplife reporter said that James and Marnie "mean business" and Tony was no match for them. They quipped that James "cooked up so much trouble for [Tony] that he was almost relieved to throw in the kitchen towel." Another columnist from the magazine said "we already know that dodgy lawyer James Nightingale is a wrong'un" and correctly guessed that he would try and bribe Harry for sex. Sarah Ellis from Inside Soap said that James and Marnie "seemed to revel in causing destruction wherever they went, and it was clear they didn't care who they stomped on to get what they wanted." She has also branded them a ruthless, "machiavellian", "devious duo" and "wicked mother-and-son team" who have "wreaked havoc" in the show. Ellis opined that she was not surprised James is "such a wrong'un" after being raised by a "wicked and vindictive" mother. A fellow Inside Soap columnist said of James' scheming "there’s nothing we love more than a good soap schemer – and Hollyoaks’ James is on top form tonight. As well as helping mum Marnie with her plot to ruin the Hutch, he also has a shocking proposition of local hottie Harry! And whatever it is that James wants, he's willing to shell out a stash of cash to get it..." Referencing James and Joanne's behaviour, another columnist stated "with Hollyoaks just packed with criminals and villains, it’s a real shame that the only lawyers in town are as corrupt as their clients."

Daniel Kilkelly from Digital Spy branded James a "schemer" and that threatening other characters is his usual trick. He later commented that "schemer James" met his match in Warren Fox (Jamie Lomas). Carl Greenwood from the Daily Mirror branded James a "creepy solicitor" and "evil" character. Rhys Matthews writing for Attitude branded him a "shady village newcomer" and opined that James indecent proposal story was "very dark". A What's on TV reporter echoed other critics in calling the character Marnie's "scheming son". Lindsay writing for Metro labelled him "shady James" who had been "hanging around Starry like a bad smell" and proprietor of "underhand developments". Anthony D. Langford writing for TVSource Magazine said that he loved the character and believed he and John Paul have good chemistry. Though he could not believe James is allowed to practise law when he advises clients to commit perjury. In September 2016, Kilkelly branded James one of the show's "best new characters" and called Finnegan a "rising star" in the role. In 2023, Sarah Ellis from Inside Soap wrote that James was a "proper baddie" when he began appearing in the soap, with Ellis questioning whether he was returning "to his roots" due to his behaviour towards the McQueen family.
