= Kieron Richardson =

English actor and TV presenter (born 1986)

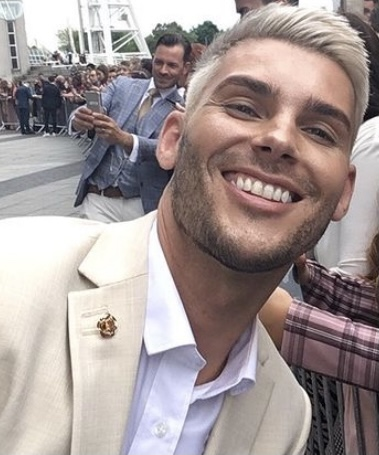
- Richardson in 2019
- Born: Kieron Mark Richardson; 12 January 1986 (age 40); Eccles, Greater Manchester, England
- Occupations: Actor; television presenter
- Years active: 2006–present
- Known for: Role of Ste Hay in Hollyoaks
- Spouse: Carl Hyland (m. 2015)
- Children: 2

Kieron Mark Richardson (born 12 January 1986) is an English actor and television presenter. He plays the role of Ste Hay in Hollyoaks, having previously appeared in Heartbeat as Ricky Smith. He won the British Soap Award for Best Onscreen Partnership with Hollyoaks co-star Emmett J. Scanlan in 2013.

== Life and career ==
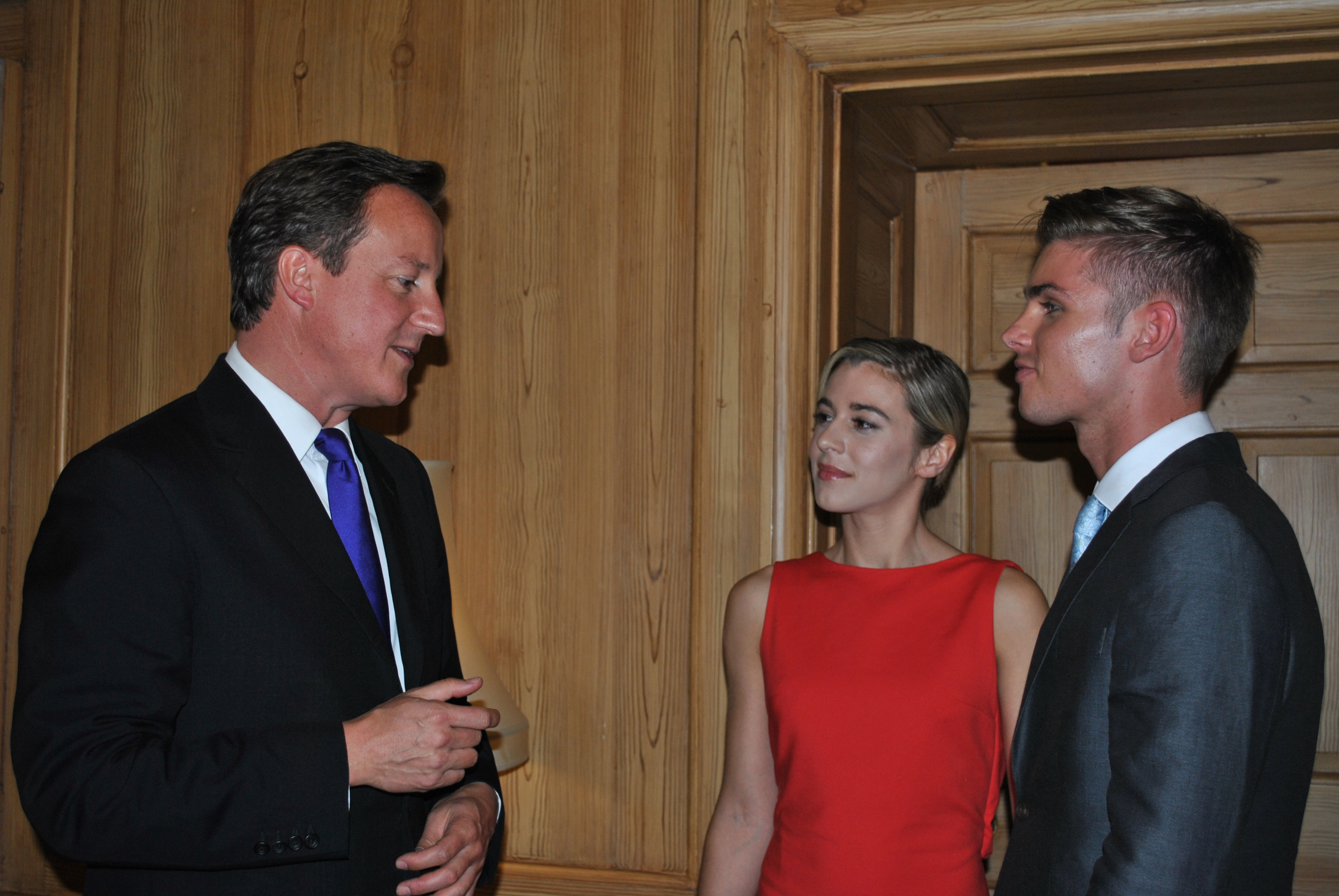
Richardson with David Cameron and Victoria Atkin at 10 Downing Street launching a campaign to eradicate homophobia and transphobia in sport.

Richardson was born in Eccles, Greater Manchester. After appearing briefly in Hollyoaks: In the City, he was offered the role of Ste Hay in the main series, Hollyoaks, where he initially appeared for 19 episodes. The character was written out of the show after stealing a car, which resulted in a crash and his character getting sent to prison. He returned to Hollyoaks on 25 September 2007, and has been a regular cast member since. Richardson has also made appearances in Holby City, Heartbeat and the feature film Fragments, as well as the pantomime Cinderella as Prince Charming at The Embassy Theatre, Skegness, in 2006.

Richardson took part in 2010 series of ITV's Dancing on Ice and was paired with Brianne Delcourt. He reached the final, finishing in third place.

Dancing on Ice performances and results
Week	Song	Artist	Score	Leaderboard	Result
2	"Beat Again"	JLS	17.5	=2nd	Safe
3	"Evergreen"	Westlife	16.0	=6th	Safe
4	"Play That Funky Music"	Wild Cherry	15.0	=6th	Safe
5	"Pencil Full of Lead"	Paolo Nutini	16.0	6th	Bottom two
6	"Don't Know Much"	Linda Ronstadt & Aaron Neville	19.5	4th	Safe
7	"Ever Fallen in Love (With Someone You Shouldn't've)"	Buzzcocks	19.5	4th	Safe
8	"Careless Whisper"	George Michael	18.5	=5th	Safe
9	"Pink Panther Theme"	Cast of Pink Panther	21.0	3rd	Safe
10	"The Great Pretender"	The Platters	23.0	4th	Bottom two
Semi-final	"Good Riddance (Time of Your Life)"	Green Day	23.0	=3rd	Safe
Final	"One Day Like This"	Elbow	24.0	3rd	Third place
Final	"Ever Fallen in Love (With Someone You Shouldn't've)"	Buzzcocks	24.5	3rd	Third place

In 2011, Richardson and his Hollyoaks ex co-star Bronagh Waugh began presenting on radio station Gaydio.

In July 2025, it was reported that Richardson would also portray Ste in the Hollyoaks late-night special Hollyoaks Later for the soap's 30th anniversary, which was broadcast on 22 October of that year.

In 2026, Richardson voiced Jake in the CBeebies fantasy animated series Rafi the Wishing Wizard.

== Personal life ==
On 15 September 2010, Richardson stated on television programme This Morning that he is gay, and had accepted that at the age of 20. He was inspired to come out by Joe McElderry. In July 2014, Richardson received homophobic abuse via Twitter.

In April 2015, Richardson married his long-term partner Carl Hyland in a ceremony in the Peak District. In December 2016, Richardson announced they were expecting twins via surrogacy. They have twins born in 2017, a boy and a girl.

== Filmography ==
Year	Show	Episode(s)	Role
2006–present	Hollyoaks	Regular role	Ste Hay
2006	Heartbeat	Recurring role	Ricky Smith
2007	It's Adam and Shelley	1 episode	Uncredited
2010	Dancing on Ice	Contestant	Himself
2010	Dancing on Ice Friday	Contestant	Himself
2010–2012	The Wright Stuff	Guest panellist	Himself
2011	Fragments	completed	Jay-Jay
2014	Challenge Live	Presenter	
2014–2015	Christmas Live	Presenter	Himself
2015	Halloween Live	Presenter	Himself
2016–2018	Big Brother's Bit on the Side	Panellist	Himself
2016	No Exit Live	Presenter	Himself
2017	Raised By Queers	Presenter	Himself
2025	Hollyoaks Later	Late night special	Ste Hay
2026	Rafi the Wishing Wizard	Regular role	Jake (voice)
