= List of Hollyoaks characters introduced in 2024 =

Hollyoaks characters introduced in 2024

Hollyoaks is a British television soap opera first broadcast on 23 October 1995. The following is a list of characters that appear in 2024, by order of first appearance. All characters are introduced by the soap's executive producers, Hannah Cheers and Angelo Abela until June 2024 when Abela departed leaving Cheers as sole executive producer. Kitty Draper was introduced in January, followed by Abe Fielding. Declan Hawthorne made his debut in February. Arlo Fielding made his debut in March. Donny Clark was introduced in April. Noah Dexter appeared in May, followed by Martha Blake and her son Jeremy Blake. As of 16 September 2024, all episodes and events are set a year later as a time jump aired in that episode.

== Kitty Draper ==
Kitty Draper
- Hollyoaks character
- Portrayed by: Iz Hesketh
- First appearance: Episode 6288; 15 January 2024
- Last appearance: Episode 6449; 27 August 2024
- Introduced by: Hannah Cheers and Angelo Abela
In-universe information
- Other names: Ivy Shaw; Ivan Hawthorne
- Occupation: Barmaid; Nurse
- Father: Declan Hawthorne

Kitty Draper, played by Iz Hesketh, made her first appearance on 15 January 2024. Kitty is involved in a four-vehicle collision and after realising that her travelling companion has died, steals her identity. Many details of Kitty have been kept under wraps, but executive producer Hannah Cheers teased a lot of "shock and intrigue" about the character. "We realised that we had the opportunity here to show the front-end of an impostor story," she told media. "Normally in an impostor story, you learn the secret after you've met the character. But to actually see the moment where somebody makes that momentary decision to take the identity of somebody else is huge."

Speaking about her character on social media, Iz said: "Looks like the cats out of the bag… I'm so proud to announce that I'm the new girl on the block in the @hollyoaksofficial Village! My character is one that British TV has needed for a long time. She's fiery, independent and has a huge heart. I'm so excited to show that trans people are just like everyone else. We have flaws, we fall in love and sometimes we make bad decisions for good reasons… brace yourselves, a new arrival is about to come into Hollyoaks with a bang".

Kitty later develops a romance with Beau Ramsey (Jon-Paul Bell). Bell said his character enjoys being around Kitty, bringing Beau out of his "shell". He thought the pair made a good match, however, he noted that they see the world differently which could cause issues in the future. On what attracts Beau to Kitty, Jon-Paul told Inside Soap magazine: "He really enjoys her energy – Kitty's been like a firecracker coming into the village and shaking things up! He's intrigued by the way Kitty lives her life, and it's brought Beau out of his shell a bit." He also added "Kitty's past, and the reason she's landed in the village, could escalate into bigger problems down the line, Beau has strong morals, but he's also very empathetic, so this could lead to us seeing darker shades of his character. It's about how far he's willing to go". The relationship later ended after both of them couldn't make it work.

In a plot-twist aired in scenes from episode 6358, originally broadcast on 22 April 2024, it was revealed that Kitty is the daughter of conversion therapist Declan Hawthorne (Alan Turkington). In episode 6367, originally broadcast on 3 May 2024, Kitty was kidnapped by Declan as part of a cliffhanger.

== DS Peel ==
DS Peel
- Hollyoaks character
- Portrayed by: Samantha Siddall
- First appearance: Episode 6290; 17 January 2024
- Last appearance: Episode 6478; 23 October 2024
- Introduced by: Hannah Cheers and Angelo Abela
In-universe information
- Occupation: Detective Sergeant

Detective Sergeant Peel, played by Samantha Siddall, was a police officer who made her debut appearance in Episode 6290, which originally aired on 17 January 2024. Siddall's casting was announced on 27 October 2023, Upon her casting, it was announced that Siddall had begun filming. Her character would be a detective and would make her debut in January 2024.

Peel interviews Felix Westwood (Richard Blackwood) following a multi-car collision in which an unnamed driver and Ella Richardson (Erin Palmer) died. After Ste Hay (Kieron Richardson) is pushed from a building, Peel interviews Ste's husband, James Nightingale (Gregory Finnegan) about the accident. Due to pressure from Warren Fox (Jamie Lomas), James does not reveal the full story. Peel is next seen after Frankie Osborne (Isabelle Smith) calls to say she wishes to change her statement about Nancy Osborne (Jessica Fox) assaulting her, but instead just makes minor changes, annoying Peel. The following week, she conducts an interview with Lucas Hay (Oscar Curtis) and Ro Hutchinson (Ava Webster) following the disappearance of Declan Hawthorne (Alan Turkington).

== Kane ==
Kane
- Hollyoaks character
- Portrayed by: Ben Castle-Gibb
- First appearance: Episode 6290; 17 January 2024
- Last appearance: Episode 6331; 14 March 2024
- Introduced by: Hannah Cheers and Angelo Abela
In-universe information
- Occupation: Drug dealer

Kane, played by Ben Castle-Gibb, is a drug dealer who first appeared in Episode 6290, which first aired on 17 January 2024. He disposed of the car that Ste Hay (Kieron Richardson) accidentally killed Ella Richardson (Erin Palmer) with. After discovering that the car killed Ella, Kane threatens Ste, prompting Ste to beat him up. Kane returns the car and calls the police. Ste's husband, James Nightingale (Gregory Finnegan) later meets with Kane posing as a customer, but plants Ella's boot in his car, getting Kane arrested. James visits Kane in prison, threatening to harm Kane's daughter if he did not plead guilty. Kane later sees James visiting Romeo Nightingale (Owen Warner) in prison, discovering that James is Romeo's father. Kane deals Romeo's cellmate a dodgy batch of drugs that kills him, allowing Kane to become Romeo's new cellmate and threaten his life. Kane demands £250,000 from James to ensure Romeo's safety, which James is forced to steal from the estate of the recently deceased Rafe Harcourt (Chris Gordon). However, once Kane receives the money, he goes back on his word and stabs Romeo as revenge for James framing him and threatening his family.

After Romeo survives the stabbing and manages to escape from prison, Kane is visited by Ella's father, Warren Fox (Jamie Lomas), who demands to know who is responsible for Ella's death. Kane proposes a deal where if he tells Warren who is behind Ella's death, Warren will help him get out of prison. After punching Kane, Warren agrees to the deal. Kane reveals that Ste and James were responsible for Ella's death, although he is unsure which one killed her. James later spots Warren shaking hands with Kane. He departed in Episode 6331, which originally aired on 14 March 2024, however Castle-Gibbs' departure was announced on 19 March 2024. When announcing his departure on Instagram, he said "loved giving it large as Kane for the past few months...it's been an absolute blast." He also thanked his agency for "such a wicked opportunity." Owen Warner, who plays Romeo also commented on Castle-Gibb's time as Kane: "smashed it bro, and you're forgiven for stabbing me with a toothbrush."

== Abe Fielding ==
Abe Fielding
- Hollyoaks character
- Portrayed by: Tyler Conti
- Duration: 2024–2025
- First appearance: Episode 6291; 18 January 2024
- Last appearance: Episode 6523; 5 February 2025
- Introduced by: Hannah Cheers and Angelo Abela
In-universe information
- Occupation: Personal trainer
- Father: Mick Cornus
- Mother: Marie Fielding
- Half-brothers: Joel Dexter; Arlo Fielding
- Wife: Peri Lomax (2025)
- Stepdaughters: Steph Cunningham-Lomax
- Nephews: Noah Dexter; Joseph McQueen
- Nieces: Clara Dexter

Abe Fielding, played by Tyler Conti, made his first appearance on 18 January 2024. The character and casting was announced on 15 January 2024. Much of the character's background was kept secret, and Abe was introduced with a "massive secret" that would "send spark waves" through the village. The only implied connection from the character was that Abe was going to be "heavily involved" with the McQueen family. Abe was later revealed to be the ex-boyfriend of returning character Cleo McQueen (Nadine Mulkerrin), who left him due to his controlling behaviour. Abe arrives in the village looking for Cleo after she is involved in a multi-vehicle collision, unaware that she is searching for her ex-fiancé Joel Dexter (Rory Douglas-Speed). A press release for the character described Abe as: "Very loving, friendly, and approachable, but under the surface there's more than meets the eye," and teased an "unexpected" family connection. Speaking about his character, Tyler commented: "Abe is a charming working-class young lad with a manipulative streak a mile-wide. The ingredients of a deeply troubled past and a complicated family life have brewed his dangerous temper, especially when things don't go his way. I can't wait for Abe to explode into the Hollyoaks village, you can expect danger, manipulation, and one heck of a messy family that comes with it."

Cleo is stuck between Abe and Joel as they both fight for her – Abe and Cleo later reconcile and have sex but Abe then manipulates her moments after. After hearing Abe on a phone call with a random woman discussing money conditions, Mercedes McQueen (Jennifer Metcalfe) becomes suspicious of Abe. Theresa McQueen (Jorgie Porter) tries to find Abe to ridicule him on his behaviour to Cleo. She finds him in the loft, the pair get drunk and then sleep together. Theresa later confesses to Cleo of their deceit after Kathleen-Angel McQueen (Kiara Mellor) outlandishly told the family of their one night stand, causing a strain on the pairs relationships. In March 2024, after an argument with Cleo, Abe lashes out and smashes an ornament against the wall. Speaking about Mercedes' suspicions, Conti said:

"I think Abe thinks that he has met people like Mercedes before, I think he is good with his words, and can find his way out of anything. A typical gaslighter that, if he keeps on saying no, if he just keeps on lying, no one's going to find him out. He thinks he can worm his way around Mercedes, and the McQueens. He has dealt with a lot of stuff in his life, so I think this isn't really anything too drastic for him. He's got other fish to fry at the moment."

On 15 January 2024, it was announced that former EastEnders actress Rita Simons would be taking over the role of Abe's mother Marie Fielding. Abe's connection to Marie and Joel was not announced prior to his first appearance. Marie returned in episode 6332, originally broadcast on 15 March 2024 during a physical fight between Joel and Abe. Whilst drinking in the loft with Joel, Abe, Cleo and Leela, she reveals she has a missing son, Arlo (Dan Hough). Arlo previously made a cameo appearance in episode 6334, originally broadcast on 19 March 2024 as part of a major plot-twist that his half-brother Abe is actually his kidnapper. Marie wants to obtain Arlo back after Abe secretly sent him to stay with his father and an unknown woman (presumably his stepmother), disguising it as a kidnapping. When Joel and Leela let Marie move in, Marie hires a new private investigator (as the expenses are covered by Joel). The private investigator immediately finds a lead in Ireland, though Marie is stopped on her way by the police as Abe has framed her for drugging Arlo with sedatives. Marie is then released and overhears a conversation between Abe and Cleo, confessing that he set Marie up. Cleo covers for Abe and lets Marie believe it was her. In early April 2024, Marie is told that a body has been found in Ireland that they may believe is Arlo (this is confirmed untrue as Arlo appears in the spring trailer released by Hollyoaks). Abe then rushes to Dublin in a bid to search for his brother, knowing he is alive.

The story reaches a climax when Chris returns to Hollyoaks village with Arlo. Clutching at straws, he eventually admits to Cleo that he is behind the kidnapping of Arlo as he believed Marie is incapable of having children. Cleo later promised to assist Abe giving Arlo back to Chris, but then helped him escape whilst Abe's back had turned. Arlo returned to Marie in episode 6353, originally broadcast on 15 April 2024. Arlo's stepmother, Demi (Ainsley Howard), returns to Hollyoaks village in a bid to return Arlo to Chris' care.

On 21 May 2024, it was announced that the Hollyoaks production team had joined with the Home Office to produce a coercive control storyline involving Abe and Cleo. The Home Office had previously worked with Hollyoaks to produce a plot involving Maxine Minniver (Nikki Sanderson) and an incel group led by Eric Foster (Angus Castle-Doughty). The plot was to be one of the show's central focus points in Summer 2024. It was followed up with a report that Hollyoaks would be continuing with the domestic violence plot as well as the coercive control. It was reported the soap's partnership with Home Office will "shine a light" on the harmful behaviours that can occur within controlling relationships and demonstrate the impact of violence on victims. Home Secretary James Cleverly, reacting to the upcoming plot, said: "Tackling violence against women and girls is a real priority for me. We know that controlling and coercive relationships can have a lasting and severe impact on victims. That's why we made it a specific criminal offence and are making sure those convicted are monitored by the police in the same way as physically violent offenders. By partnering with Hollyoaks, we're raising awareness of how to recognise these behaviours as well as empowering the public to call out abuse when they see it and safely intervene when appropriate." The partnership began on 20 May, with the first notable incident showing Abe becoming violent towards Cleo after Joel and Leela's wedding.

== Declan Hawthorne ==
Declan Hawthorne
- Hollyoaks character
- Portrayed by: Alan Turkington
- First appearance: Episode 6320; 28 February 2024
- Last appearance: Episode 6378; 20 May 2024
- Introduced by: Hannah Cheers and Angelo Abela
In-universe information
- Occupation: Conversion therapist Church leader
- Daughters: Kitty Draper

Declan Hawthorne, played by Alan Turkington, made his first appearance on 28 February 2024. The character and casting was announced on 6 February 2024. Declan is a practitioner of conversion therapy alongside Carter Shepherd (David Ames), and assists Carter in attempting to influence the sexuality of Lucas Hay (Oscar Curtis).

Speaking about joining the soap, Alan said: "I'm absolutely thrilled to be joining the Hollyoaks family, who have made me feel so welcome – even as a very unwelcome character! We've already filmed some incredibly intense scenes, including those in Declan's first episode. He's a toxically religious man who fervently believes in the therapy he is advocating. He feels that these men have lost their way, when really it's he who has 'strayed from the righteous path'. I feel very privileged as an actor to be able to highlight the evils of conversion therapy with this storyline and I can't wait to see how tensions play out with Carter, Lucas, and maybe some others in the village."

Declan was killed off in the episode airing on 20 May 2024, after sustaining a head injury during a fight with Kitty Draper (Iz Hesketh) and Beau Ramsey (Jon-Paul Bell).

== Arlo Fielding ==
Arlo Fielding
- Hollyoaks character
- Portrayed by: Dan Hough
- Duration: 2024–2025
- First appearance: Episode 6334; 19 March 2024
- Last appearance: Episode 6637; 29 October 2025
- Introduced by: Hannah Cheers and Angelo Abela
In-universe information
- Father: Chris
- Mother: Marie Fielding
- Stepmother: Demi
- Half-brothers: Joel Dexter; Abe Fielding
- Nephews: Noah Dexter; Joseph McQueen
- Nieces: Clara Dexter

Arlo Fielding, portrayed by Dan Hough, is the son of Marie Fielding (Rita Simons) and the half-brother of Joel Dexter (Rory Douglas-Speed) and Abe Fielding (Tyler Conti). He made his debut in spring 2024. He previously made a cameo appearance in episode 6334, originally broadcast on 19 March 2024 as part of a major plot-twist that his half-brother Abe is actually his kidnapper. Marie wants to obtain Arlo back after Abe secretly sent him to stay with his father and an unknown woman, disguising it as a kidnapping. When Marie hires a private investigator, she finds a lead in Ireland, though is stopped on her way by the police as Abe has framed her for drugging Arlo with sedatives. Marie is then released and overhears a conversation between Abe and his girlfriend Cleo McQueen (Nadine Mulkerrin), confessing that he set Marie up. Cleo covers for Abe and lets Marie believe it was her. In early April 2024, Marie is told that a body has been found in Ireland that they may believe is Arlo (this is confirmed untrue as Arlo appears in the spring trailer released by Hollyoaks). Abe then rushes to Dublin in a bid to search for his half-brother, knowing he is alive.

The story reaches a climax when Chris returns to Hollyoaks village with Arlo. Clutching at straws, he eventually admits to Cleo that he is behind the kidnapping of Arlo as he believed Marie is incapable of having children. Cleo later promised to assist Abe giving Arlo back to Chris, but then helped him escape whilst Abe's back had turned. Arlo returned to Marie in episode 6353, originally broadcast on 15 April 2024. Arlo's stepmother, Demi (Ainsley Howard), returns to Hollyoaks village in a bid to return Arlo to Chris' care on Arlo's thirteenth birthday.

Johnathon Hughes from Inside Soap called Arlo "evil" due to his bullying of Ro.

== Donny Clark ==
Mick Johnson (also Donny Clark), played by Louis Emerick, made his first Hollyoaks appearance during the episode broadcast on 8 April 2024. The character and casting was announced on 2 April 2024. He is the father of established characters Vicky Grant (Anya Lawrence) and Andre Clark (David Joshua-Anthony). Donny makes his first appearance when he unexpectedly arrives at Vicky's 18th birthday party. The character has been billed as "charisma personified", who is "determined to build a relationship with Vicky upon his arrival in the village". Discussing Donny's arrival in Hollyoaks, Emerick commented: "Donny is coming back to see his son and it collides with his daughter's birthday, which is very emotional as it's the first time he has met her". On joining the soap, Emerick stated: "It has equally been moving for me personally. I was there when Hollyoaks began. We sat with the Brookside and Hollyoaks crew and watched a screening of the first ever episode in 1995. It is so exciting to be back with this vibrant cast and crew, back on the set where it all began."

Donny unexpectedly arrives at Vicky's 18th birthday party, much to the dismay of her and Scott. Vicky assumes his arrival was because he sabotaged Scott adopting her. Andre later admits it was him that invited Donny as he thought Vicky would be delighted. Vicky claims that Scott has been a better father in the past two years then Donny has eighteen. He later explains he knew nothing about the adoption and that abandoning her was not by choice, but by force.

In 2025, Chloe Timms from Inside Soap wrote, "we love Donny – sometimes we wish he was our dad too!"

== Noah Dexter ==
Noah Dexter
- Hollyoaks character
- Portrayed by: Uncredited
- Appears in: Episode 6384; 28 May 2024
- Introduced by: Hannah Cheers and Angelo Abela
In-universe information
- Father: Joel Dexter
- Mother: Leela Lomax
- Sisters: Clara Dexter
- Half-brothers: Daniel Lomax; Sid Sumner (adoptive); Joseph McQueen
- Half-sisters: Peri Lomax
- Grandfathers: Warren Fox; Danny Lomax
- Grandmothers: Marie Fielding; Sam Lomax
- Uncles: Ste Hay; Abe Fielding; Arlo Fielding; Sebastian Blake
- Aunts: Tegan Lomax; Ella Richardson; Sophie Blake; Maria-Gabriella Fox-McQueen
- Nieces: Steph Cunningham-Lomax
- First cousins: Dee Dee Hutchinson; Lucas Hay; Hannah Hay-O'Connor; Leah Barnes (adoptive)
- Other relatives: Norma Crow; Katy Fox

Noah Dexter is the stillborn son of Joel (Rory Douglas-Speed) and Leela Dexter (Kirsty-Leigh Porter), who appears in episode 6384, originally broadcast on 28 May 2024. The storyline was originally announced on 21 May 2024. The storyline was partly replicated from Porter's own baby loss experience from December 2018. Porter praised the storyline, claiming she was "not the same Kirsty" since losing her daughter Penny-Leigh. She also added she hoped it would "save a life". It was further reported that the loss would happen hours after her wedding to Joel. Porter appeared on ITV daytime talk-show Loose Women to spread awareness on the topic and spoke out on her role in the storyline. She mentioned her own experience and reaction when she found out she had lost her own child, saying she had her "breath and soul sucked out" of her. She added: "It's not something you will ever get over" and the silence when they've given you the news is deafening. The scenes aired in episode 6382, originally broadcast on 24 May 2024. The scenes were branded "devastating", displaying usual chat with nurses about parenthood – the nurse required a second opinion before admitting Leela had lost her baby. The episode then featured silent credits to signify the loss. Douglas-Speed praised the plot and Porter's portrayal.

Noah was the product of induced labour. Leela was being comforted by Joel's mother Marie Fielding (Rita Simons) when her contractions began. Noah was born in hospital, still unnamed, which Joel and Leela decided to name him Noah. Due to the upset, Joel could not hold Noah – clear to Leela's annoyance until she came back into the room whilst Joel was singing and declaring his love for Leela to his stillborn son. He was wrapped up in a notable blue Fire Truck blanket that was given to the nurse by them as all of their clothes purchased for the baby had been too big.

== Martha Blake ==
Martha Blake
- Hollyoaks character
- Portrayed by: Sherrie Hewson
- Duration: 2024–2025
- First appearance: Episode 6385; 29 May 2024
- Last appearance: Episode 6625; 1 October 2025
- Introduced by: Hannah Cheers and Angelo Abela
In-universe information
- Husband: Charles Blake
- Sons: Patrick Blake; Jeremy Blake
- Grandsons: Dodger Savage
- Granddaughters: Sienna Blake; Dilly Harcourt; Minnie Minniver
- Other relatives: Nico Blake; Myra-Pocahontas Savage-McQueen; Sebastian Blake; Sophie Blake; Tori-Devine Banks

Martha Blake, portrayed by Sherrie Hewson, is introduced as the estranged mother of deceased Patrick Blake (Jeremy Sheffield). She made her first appearance in episode 6385, originally broadcast on 29 May 2024. Martha, along with son Jeremy (also portrayed by Sheffield) are set to make their debuts in spring 2024. Their casting and characters details were announced on 3 May 2024. Hewson, delighted of her casting said: "It's been a rollercoaster joining Hollyoaks! The character is just wonderful to play. Everyone is so lovely, such a great atmosphere to work in and so welcoming. We laugh a lot, what more could you ask for?" Teasing the upcoming plot, executive producer Hannah Cheers added: "To be a Blake, you must be clever, captivating and charming on the outside… and calculating, cold and cynical on the inside, with a family dynasty so rich in history, it should come as no surprise that there are still many secrets to be uncovered. But for Sienna, Dilly, Liberty and Maxine, what happens next is not what anyone could have expected…." On 8 July 2025 it was announced that Hewson had quit her role as Martha and will leave later in the year. Martha was killed off by her serial killer son Jeremy Blake in the episode broadcast on 1 October 2025.

After 23 August 2024, Martha didn't appear for a while, but on 7 October 2024, Hewson announced that she would be returning as Martha in the Johnny Seifert's Secure The Insecure podcast. This return would be after the events of the time-jump. "I am in the next [opening] titles, because I've now gone back," she said. "I was not there in August, this August gone, because they were going on with the time jump. I've been in a home, I think. I'm out of the home now," she said. "I'm back with Sienna now. I'm living with Sienna now, but she's thrown Jeremy out. But now I think we're all back. It's very confusing. I just go and I go, what's the next scene?" Martha's return had been teased by Anna Passey, who plays her on-screen granddaughter, Sienna Blake who said: "Martha isn't done." Passey also suggested that Martha's return would show her father, Jeremy Blake's (Jeremy Sheffield), who she until recently believed was her uncle and that his twin brother Patrick Blake (Jeremy Sheffield), past. "There's more to learn about her and Jez's history. When Sienna met Martha, they repelled each other like magnets, but sometimes these people end up being very important in your life," she said. "I think Martha is going to play a key role in the family in the future – and Sherrie Hewson is genius; she played the ultimate Blake!".

== Rex Gallagher ==
Rex Gallagher
- Hollyoaks character
- Portrayed by: Jonny Labey
- Duration: 2024–2026
- First appearance: Episode 6397; 14 June 2024
- Last appearance: Episode 6745; 15 July 2026
- Introduced by: Hannah Cheers
- Crossover appearances: Brookside (2025)
In-universe information
- Occupation: Career criminal
- Father: Fraser Black
- Mother: Grace Black
- Stepfather: Freddie Roscoe
- Half-brothers: Curtis Royle
- Half-sisters: Dee Dee Hutchinson; Grace Black; Clare Devine
- Husband: Ste Hay (2026; void)
- Grandfathers: Fraser Black; Froggy Black
- Grandmothers: Tracey Donovan
- Uncles: Liam Donovan; Adam Donovan; Jesse Donovan; Connor "Sully" Sullivan
- Aunts: Clare Devine; Dee Dee Hutchinson
- Nephews: Curtis Royle
- Nieces: Tori Devine-Banks (adoptive)
- First cousins: Iona Campbell; Tori Devine-Banks (adoptive)
- Other relatives: Froggy Black; Connor "Sully" Sullivan

Rex Gallagher, portrayed by Jonny Labey, made his first appearance on 14 June 2024. Rex is introduced as a criminal rival against Warren Fox (Jamie Lomas) as part of Warren's ongoing torture of Ste Hay (Kieron Richardson) after he accidentally murdered Warren's daughter Ella Richardson (Erin Palmer) in a hit-and-run on the Dee Valley bypass back in January 2024. Labey was already notable prior to accepting the role for his work in soap rival EastEnders after he was cast as Paul Coker in 2015. His casting was initially heavily speculated on 16 May 2024 after a group photo of the actors on-set was posted on social media with Labey spotted on-set. The characters name and casting details were then further announced on 4 June 2024. Daniel Kilkelly from Digital Spy branded the character as "villainous".

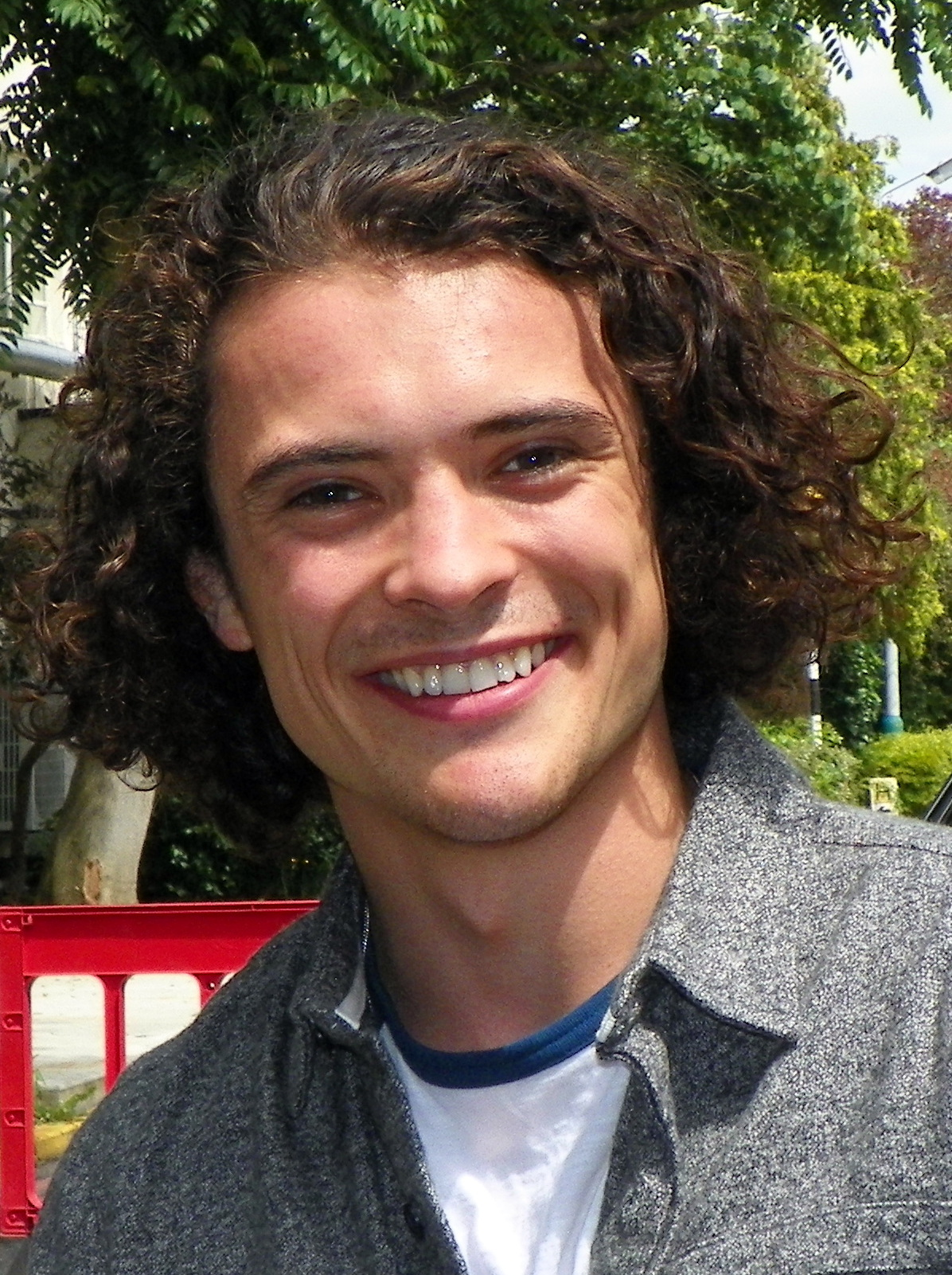
Labey (pictured) has portrayed Rex since 2024.

Speaking of the audition process, Labey mentioned he had previously auditioned "a few years back" but another opportunity landed for him. He positively applauded the production team for their development on the current characters. Labey teased Rex was "terrifying" and "brilliant", claiming it was something to "get his teeth sunk into". He added he was pleased to be cast as Rex, and when he was first told about Rex it was "along the lines of 'mad, bad and dangerous'". Rex is characterised as an unpredictable, conniving and complicated character, with his scenes being described as "harrowing". The character "thrives of confrontation" as Rex seems to "love it" whereas Labey joked that "squaring up to Warren was a bit of a big gulp in the throat". Labey teased a possible relationship between Rex and Ste, saying the relationship is a turbulent one and Ste is over-intrigued by Rex. He added that Ste will not know of Rex's real intentions or what he may be after.

Praising his co-star's, he added working with Richardson and Lomas were "great" and "fun", adding he "felt in safe hands" with the both. Labey teased a link and connection with pre-established character Hannah Ashworth (Emma Rigby) as the pair had both done numerous scenes together, adding it was "nice to have a connection" with another Hollyoaks character prior to his arrival. His arrival was set to kick off after meeting Hannah. When asked if he is going to stick around in the village, he answered that he couldn't say however an opportunity "opened".

Labey appeared in the 30th anniversary episodes in late October 2025 and was part of a combined cast of Hollyoaks and Brookside characters.

In an unannounced exit, Rex was shot by an unknown assailant on 15 July 2026. The character’s death was confirmed in the following episode, airing on 20 July 2026.

== Jeremy Blake ==
Jeremy Blake
- Hollyoaks character
- Portrayed by: Jeremy Sheffield
- Duration: 2024–2025
- First appearance: Episode 6400; 19 June 2024
- Last appearance: Episode 6634; 22 October 2025
- Introduced by: Hannah Cheers
- Crossover appearances: Brookside (2025)
In-universe information
- Other names: Jez Blake
- Occupation: Gardener
- Father: Charles Blake
- Mother: Martha Blake
- Brothers: Patrick Blake
- Sons: Dodger Savage
- Daughters: Sienna Blake
- Grandsons: Sebastian Blake
- Granddaughters: Nico Blake; Myra-Pocahontas Savage-McQueen; Sophie Blake
- Nieces: Dilly Harcourt; Minnie Minniver
- Other relatives: Tori Devine-Banks

Jeremy "Jez" Blake, portrayed by Jeremy Sheffield, is introduced as the long-lost twin-brother of deceased Patrick Blake, who was also portrayed by Sheffield. Jez, along with mother Martha (Sherrie Hewson), are set to make their debuts in spring 2024. Their casting and characters details were announced on 3 May 2024. Sheffield, who knew he would be introduced back into Hollyoaks later in the year, did not know he would play a new character. Delighted at the news, he stated: "I'm so excited to be back in the village and have the opportunity to play a great new character, Jez might be Patrick's twin but he couldn't be more different; he's charming, enigmatic, complex and full of mystery. Working with the wonderful Sherrie Hewson means we get to explore even more of the famously twisted Blake family secrets."

Teasing the upcoming plot, executive producer Hannah Cheers added: "To be a Blake, you must be clever, captivating and charming on the outside… and calculating, cold and cynical on the inside, with a family dynasty so rich in history, it should come as no surprise that there are still many secrets to be uncovered. But for Sienna, Dilly, Liberty and Maxine, what happens next is not what anyone could have expected…."

Jeremy's serial killer plot received a "Best Soap Storyline" nomination at the 2025 Digital Spy Reader Awards.

On the 1st October 2025 set in 2026 Jeremy Blake Killed Martha Blake. On 22 October 2025 Jez was killed off after being pushed over the edge of railings by Liberty Savage and John Paul McQueen into the propellers of the plane he had originally crashed into The Love Boat causing him to meet his demise. The same episode Hollyoaks crossover with Brookside.

== Maria-Carmella McQueen ==
Maria-Carmella McQueen
- Hollyoaks character
- Portrayed by: Uncredited
- Duration: 2024–present
- First appearance: Episode 6417; 12 July 2024
- Introduced by: Hannah Cheers
In-universe information
- Family: McQueen
- Father: Felix Westwood
- Mother: Mercedes McQueen
- Half-brothers: Mitchell Deveraux; Toby Faroe; DeMarcus Westwood; Bobby Costello; Gabriel McQueen
- Half-sisters: Celeste Faroe; Maria-Gabriella Fox-McQueen
- Grandmothers: Myra McQueen
- Uncles: John Paul McQueen
- Aunts: Jacqui McQueen; Tina Reilly; Carmel McQueen; Theresa McQueen; Michaela McQueen; Carmina McQueen
- First cousins: Max McQueen; Kathleen-Angel McQueen; Matthew McQueen; Myra-Pocahontas Savage-McQueen
- Other relatives: Marlena McQueen; Kathleen McQueen; Reenie McQueen; Porsche McQueen; Celine McQueen; Cleo McQueen; Breda McQueen; Goldie McQueen; Prince McQueen; Hunter McQueen

Maria-Carmella McQueen is the twin daughter of Mercedes McQueen (Jennifer Metcalfe) and Felix Westwood (Richard Blackwood). She is born on-screen in July 2024 – Felix is not present. The confirmation of Mercedes' twins surviving the pregnancy was confirmed in the Summer trailer for 2024, released on 8 July 2024. An "exclusive" scene allowed viewers to see Mercedes and Warren deciding the names for both of her children. Maria-Carmella is named after her maternal aunt, Carmel McQueen (Gemma Merna), who was killed in a train explosion in 2014. The storyline in which would see Mercedes carry twins by different fathers was first announced on 31 January 2024 after Hollyoaks production team confirmed the plot. Superfecundation has not been tackled in soap opera before, with Mercedes being the first character ever to have twin children from two different fathers.

Fans previously predicted the twins would be born from superfecundation prior to the twist. Stephen Patterson of Metro has cited the storyline as "staggering" and "groundbreaking". Mercedes' superfecundation storyline was also nominated for "Best Storyline" in the Radio Times soap awards 2024.

== Maria-Gabriella McQueen ==
Maria-Gabriella McQueen
- Hollyoaks character
- Portrayed by: Uncredited
- Duration: 2024–present
- First appearance: Episode 6417; 12 July 2024
- Introduced by: Hannah Cheers
In-universe information
- Family: McQueen
- Father: Warren Fox
- Mother: Mercedes McQueen
- Half-brothers: Joel Dexter; Sebastian Blake; Bobby Costello; Gabriel McQueen
- Half-sisters: Ella Richardson; Sophie Blake; Maria-Carmella McQueen
- Grandmothers: Norma Crow; Myra McQueen
- Uncles: John Paul McQueen
- Aunts: Katy Fox; Jacqui McQueen; Tina Reilly; Carmel McQueen; Theresa McQueen; Michaela McQueen; Carmina McQueen
- Nephews: Noah Dexter; Joseph McQueen
- Nieces: Clara Dexter
- First cousins: Max McQueen; Kathleen-Angel McQueen; Matthew McQueen; Myra-Pocahontas Savage-McQueen
- Other relatives: Marlena McQueen; Kathleen McQueen; Reenie McQueen; Porsche McQueen; Celine McQueen; Cleo McQueen; Breda McQueen; Goldie McQueen; Prince McQueen; Hunter McQueen

Maria-Gabriella McQueen is the daughter of Mercedes McQueen (Jennifer Metcalfe) and Warren Fox (Jamie Lomas). She is born on-screen in July 2024. The confirmation of Mercedes' twins surviving the pregnancy was confirmed in the Summer trailer for 2024, released on 8 July 2024. An "exclusive" scene allowed viewers to see Mercedes and Warren deciding the names for both of her children. Maria-Gabriella is named after her half brother Gabriel McQueen who was stillborn in 2015. The storyline in which would see Mercedes carry twins by different fathers was first announced on 31 January 2024 after Hollyoaks production team confirmed the plot. Superfecundation has not been tackled in soap opera before, with Mercedes being the first character ever to have twin children from two different fathers.

Fans previously predicted the twins would be born from superfecundation prior to the twist. Stephen Patterson of Metro has cited the storyline as "staggering" and "groundbreaking". Mercedes' superfecundation storyline was also nominated for "Best Storyline" in the Radio Times soap awards 2024.

== Theo Anderson ==
Theo Anderson
- Hollyoaks character
- Portrayed by: Uncredited
- Duration: 2024–2025
- First appearance: Episode 6444; 20 August 2024
- Last appearance: Episode 6516; 21 January 2025
- Introduced by: Hannah Cheers
In-universe information
- Family: McQueen
- Father: Prince McQueen
- Mother: Zoe Anderson
- Grandfathers: Shane Sweeney
- Grandmothers: Goldie McQueen; Sharon Bailey
- Uncles: Hunter McQueen
- Other relatives: Pearl Anderson; Mercedes McQueen; John Paul McQueen; Theresa McQueen; Cleo McQueen; Breda McQueen; Matthew McQueen; Kathleen-Angel McQueen; Celine McQueen; Porsche McQueen; Reenie McQueen; Bart McQueen; Marlena McQueen; Myra-Pocahontas Savage-McQueen

Theo Anderson is the son of Zoe Anderson (Garcia Brown) and Prince McQueen (Malique Thompson-Dwyer). Zoe discovered that she was pregnant in June 2024, the day before her late fiancé, Hunter McQueen's (Theo Graham) funeral. Zoe initially allowed Hunter's family to believe Hunter was the father, before secretly confessing to Hunter's twin brother, Prince that he was the real father of her baby, following a drunken one-night-stand they had shortly before Hunter's death, ruling out Hunter as the father as they hadn't slept together when they got back together. Prince wanted Zoe to have an abortion, but Zoe decided to go ahead with the pregnancy, insisting Prince could be nothing more than an uncle to the baby.

In August 2024, whilst attempting to arrest Kitty Draper (Iz Hesketh) at the village play park for assisting an offender, Zoe went into premature labour. Kitty called an ambulance before helping Zoe in the pavilion with her contractions, before the paramedics arrived and helped Zoe give birth to a baby boy, before rushing the baby to the ICU at Dee Valley University Hospital. Zoe and Prince were later informed that their son had a low chance of survival and needed to prepare for the worst. Zoe and Prince believed that their son's condition was karma for them betraying Hunter, and Zoe initially struggled seeing her son, but changed her mind after Kitty opened up about not being a part of her daughter's life. Whilst struggling to choose a name for their baby, Zoe suggested Theo meaning God's gift, which Prince loves.

== Sunshine ==
Sunshine
- Hollyoaks character
- Portrayed by: Rob Beckett
- Appears in: Episode 6457; 5 September 2024
- Introduced by: Hannah Cheers
In-universe information
- Occupation: Prisoner

Sunshine is a prisoner who is mates with former police officer, Donny Clark (Louis Emerick). He is played by comedian Rob Beckett, whose casting was announced on 26 August 2024, alongside his comedy partner, Romesh Ranganathan, who will appear as prison guard, Reg. The pair appeared on 5 September 2024. Rob and Romesh's cameos will be part of their Rob & Romesh Vs series. Their scenes featured as part of Warren Fox's (Jamie Lomas) "explosive" exit storyline. Digital Spy revealed photos of Rob and Romesh with Emerick, Lomas and Jennifer Metcalfe, who plays Mercedes McQueen. Rob and Romesh appeared in prison as Warren has been wrongfully imprisoned for the death of his mother, Norma Crow (Glynis Barber), who was actually murdered by gangster Blue, who was recently revealed to be Hollyoaks resident, Dave Williams (Dominic Power). Mercedes and Donny came up with a rescue plan, which ropes in Sunshine and Reg. These scenes have been described to be the "last episode before the new era of three 20-minute episodes a week kicks off with the traditional autumn stunt week starting on 9 September 2024, followed by a 12-month time jump which takes effect in the week of 16 September 2024."

Executive producer, Hannah Cheers spoke about Rob and Romesh's casting: "As an avid fan of their show Rob and Romesh Vs, it was a no-brainer to cast the pair and put their skills to the test. There was such a buzz on set watching Rob and Romesh transform from funny men to stunt men for the day with their co-stars. The pivotal scene is part of Warren's ongoing battle with Blue – and paves the way to our highly anticipated stunt week. The pivotal scene is part of Warren's ongoing battle with Blue – and paves the way to our highly anticipated stunt week." Lomas described working with the comedians as "a real pleasure and lots of fun". He continued: "They switched into their characters when they needed to though and smashed it! I can't wait for everyone to finally see the episode."

== Reg ==
Reg
- Hollyoaks character
- Portrayed by: Romesh Ranganathan
- Appears in: Episode 6457; 5 September 2024
- Introduced by: Hannah Cheers
In-universe information
- Occupation: Prison Guard

Reg is a prison guard, who is mates with former police officer, Donny Clark (Louis Emerick). He is played by comedian Romesh Ranganathan, whose casting was announced on 26 August 2024, alongside his comedy partner, Rob Beckett, who will appear as prisoner, Sunshine. The pair appeared on 6 September 2024. Rob and Romesh's cameos is part of their Rob & Romesh Vs series. Their scenes featured as part of Warren Fox's (Jamie Lomas) "explosive" exit storyline. Digital Spy revealed photos of Rob and Romesh with Emerick, Lomas and Jennifer Metcalfe, who plays Mercedes McQueen. Rob and Romesh appeared in prison as Warren has been wrongfully imprisoned for the death of his mother, Norma Crow (Glynis Barber), who was actually murdered by gangster Blue, who was recently revealed to be Hollyoaks resident, Dave Williams (Dominic Power). Mercedes and Donny came up with a rescue plan, which ropes in Sunshine and Reg. These scenes have been described to be the "last episode before the new era of three 20-minute episodes a week kicks off with the traditional autumn stunt week starting on 9 September 2024, followed by a 12-month time jump which takes effect in the week of 16 September 2024."

Executive producer, Hannah Cheers spoke about Rob and Romesh's casting: "As an avid fan of their show Rob and Romesh Vs, it was a no-brainer to cast the pair and put their skills to the test. There was such a buzz on set watching Rob and Romesh transform from funny men to stunt men for the day with their co-stars. The pivotal scene is part of Warren's ongoing battle with Blue – and paves the way to our highly anticipated stunt week. The pivotal scene is part of Warren's ongoing battle with Blue – and paves the way to our highly anticipated stunt week." Lomas described working with the comedians as "a real pleasure and lots of fun". He continued: "They switched into their characters when they needed to though and smashed it! I can't wait for everyone to finally see the episode."

== James Barnes ==
James Barnes
- Hollyoaks character
- Portrayed by: Uncredited
- Duration: 2024–2026
- First appearance: Episode 6491; 16 September 2024
- Last appearance: Episode 6692; 16 March 2026
- Introduced by: Hannah Cheers
In-universe information
- Father: Dillon Ray
- Mother: Leah Barnes
- Grandfathers: Billy Parker; Ste Hay (adoptive)
- Grandmothers: Aisha Ray; Amy Barnes
- Uncles: Lucas Hay
- Aunts: Hannah Hay-O'Connor
- Other relatives: Leela Lomax; Peri Lomax

James Barnes is the son of Leah Barnes (Ela-May Demircan) and Dillon Ray (Nathaniel Dass), who was born on 16 September 2025, in scenes which aired in Episode 6491 on 16 September 2024. He is named after Leah's stepfather, James Nightingale (Gregory Finnegan), who was killed off in a car explosion after a bomb planted underneath his car by villainous gangster Dave Williams (Dominic Power) (aka Blue), detonated with him and his husband, Ste Hay (Kieron Richardson) inside leaving the latter in a year-long coma.

After the time jump, it was revealed that Leah was pregnant and went into labor at an engagement party at Casa McQueen. Leah gave birth to James with the help of her aunt Leela Dexter (Kirsty-Leigh Porter) and cousin Peri Lomax (Ruby O'Donnell), moments before Ste was brought out of his coma. Initially, it was unknown who the father was and it was originally assumed to be Charlie Dean (Charlie Behan), until it was confirmed on 23 September 2024 that Dillon was the father. This has caused worry as Dillon is Leah's brother, Lucas Hay's (Oscar Curtis) boyfriend and both feel that he won't forgive them for their infidelity. Leah wanted to give James up for adoption, but gave Ste the opportunity to raise him himself whilst she goes off to university in America. Ste agrees to raise James last minute, which has caused discomfort for Dillon, who doesn't want to be revealed as the father. Leah then departed Hollyoaks to go to uni, with Demircan's final scenes airing on 24 September 2024.

== Clara Dexter ==
Clara Dexter
- Hollyoaks character
- Portrayed by: Uncredited
- Duration: 2024–present
- First appearance: Episode 6483; 5 November 2024
- Introduced by: Hannah Cheers
In-universe information
- Father: Joel Dexter
- Mother: Leela Lomax
- Brothers: Noah Dexter
- Half-brothers: Daniel Lomax; Sid Sumner (adoptive); Joseph McQueen
- Half-sisters: Peri Lomax
- Grandfathers: Warren Fox; Danny Lomax
- Grandmothers: Marie Fielding; Sam Lomax
- Uncles: Ste Hay; Abe Fielding; Arlo Fielding; Sebastian Blake
- Aunts: Tegan Lomax; Ella Richardson; Sophie Blake; Maria-Gabriella Fox-McQueen
- Nieces: Steph Cunningham-Lomax
- First cousins: Dee Dee Hutchinson; Lucas Hay; Hannah Hay-O'Connor; Leah Barnes (adoptive)
- Other relatives: Norma Crow; Katy Fox

Clara Dexter is the daughter of Leela Dexter (Kirsty-Leigh Porter) and Joel Dexter (Rory Douglas-Speed), who was born on 5 November 2025 and made her first appearance on 5 November 2024. After the time-jump in September 2024, it was revealed that Leela was pregnant again after the tragic loss of her and Joel's son, Noah in May 2024, which Erin Zammitt from Digital Spy described this to be a "heartwarming development". After Leela went into early labour, Joel who was believed to be the baby's father, wasn't present at the baby's birth as he was looking for his ex-girlfiend Cleo McQueen (Nadine Mulkerrin), whom he heard singing in Abe's flat, so Abe Fielding (Tyler Conti) acted as her birthing partner.

After her baby's birth, Leela was very emotional and refused to pose in any family photos. This began to make Joel worry about her wellbeing and expressed his worries to Grace Black (Tamara Wall), Zoe Anderson (Garcia Brown) and Prince McQueen (Malique Thompson-Dwyer), who reassured him that it was normal for her emotions to be all over the place after giving birth. On 6 November 2024, Mercedes McQueen (Jennifer Metcalfe) paid Leela a visit, where she told her that she had been so worried about delivering a healthy baby that she put all worries aside. Mercedes and Leela then discussed something that occurred in the missing year between the time-jump, which suggested Joel is not the father.

== Jacob Omari ==
Jacob Omari
- Hollyoaks character
- Portrayed by: Ethaniel Davy
- Duration: 2024–2025
- First appearance: Episode 6490; 20 November 2024
- Last appearance: Episode 6613; 3 September 2025
- Introduced by: Hannah Cheers
In-universe information
- Mother: Kat Omari

Jacob Omari, portrayed by Ethaniel Davy, is a man who Rex Gallagher (Jonny Labey) is shielding in a safe house. He first appeared in Episode 6490, which originally aired on 20 November 2024. Before his first appearance, Rex had letters addressed to someone named "J", which Ste Hay (Kieron Richardson) finds on his desk. "J"'s identity was revealed to be Jacob later that episode. Dan Laurie from Liverpool Echo revealed: "the exact nature of the relationship between Rex, Jacob, and Kat remains under wraps, but it's evident that Rex is going to great lengths to shield them from harm, sequestering them in a safe house."

On 27 November 2024, Labey revealed that in 2025, Hollyoaks would portray a storyline which tackles a "huge problem in the UK." He also explained the backstory his character has with Kat and Jacob: "We're introduced to Jacob and Kat and they are a little bit of Rex's past. Before he came to Chester, he was involved in various exploitation avenues and he has a connection with these two people." He continued: "This whole time since Rex has fallen in love with Ste, and tried to rewrite his ways, he's been keeping Jacob and Kat in a safe house, keeping them away from the danger." Labey also hinted that they have a larger connection to the show's past: "Jacob and Kat are a huge link to what Rex was. He's come from a whole dynasty of danger and crime." Labey also added that the storyline isn't talked about much: "It's not necessarily a story that's been spoken about a lot so I can tell you that and Rex is kind of being at the forefront. Something massive happens in the New Year and it's nostalgic in a weird way for fans so it's really going to set things on fire but what it leads to and the world Kat and Jacob are a part of is a much bigger picture."

== Kat Omari ==
Kat Omari
- Hollyoaks character
- Portrayed by: Sonia Ibrahim
- Duration: 2024–2025
- First appearance: Episode 6490; 20 November 2024
- Last appearance: Episode 6569; 26 May 2025
- Introduced by: Hannah Cheers
In-universe information
- Sons: Jacob Omari

Kat Omari, played by Sonia Ibrahim, is a woman who is being kept in a safe house by Rex Gallagher (Jonny Labey) alongside a man named Jacob (Ethaniel Davy). She first appeared in Episode 6490, which originally aired on 20 November 2024. Dan Laurie from Liverpool Echo described Kat to be "enigmatic" and that her connection with Rex is "mysterious". Laurie also revealed: "the exact nature of the relationship between Rex, Jacob, and Kat remains under wraps, but it's evident that Rex is going to great lengths to shield them from harm, sequestering them in a safe house."

On 27 November 2024, Labey revealed that in 2025, Hollyoaks would portray a storyline which tackles a "huge problem in the UK." He also explained the backstory his character has with Kat and Jacob: "We're introduced to Jacob and Kat and they are a little bit of Rex's past. Before he came to Chester, he was involved in various exploitation avenues and he has a connection with these two people." He continued: "This whole time since Rex has fallen in love with Ste, and tried to rewrite his ways, he's been keeping Jacob and Kat in a safe house, keeping them away from the danger." Labey also hinted that they have a larger connection to the show's past: "Jacob and Kat are a huge link to what Rex was. He's come from a whole dynasty of danger and crime." Labey also added that the storyline isn't talked about much: "It's not necessarily a story that's been spoken about a lot so I can tell you that and Rex is kind of being at the forefront. Something massive happens in the New Year and it's nostalgic in a weird way for fans so it's really going to set things on fire but what it leads to and the world Kat and Jacob are a part of is a much bigger picture."

== Other characters ==
List of other 2024 characters
Character	Episode(s)	Original broadcast date(s)	Actor	Details
Nathan	6281–6282	2–3 January	Mark Beswick	A cellmate of Prince McQueen (Malique Thompson-Dwyer) who attempts to threaten him into assisting with his drug-selling business inside prison. Prince refuses until Nathan begins threatening his family, but Nathan decides Prince took too long to answer and intimidates him.
Candy	6284	9 January	Claudia Adshead	A prostitute hired by Lucas Hay (Oscar Curtis), however, she leaves when Dillon Ray (Nathaniel Dass) reveals that he's underage.
Driver	6288	15 January	Alyssia Jarvis	A driver who along with Kitty Draper (Iz Hesketh) is involved in a multi-car collision. The driver dies in the crash, prompting Kitty to steal her identity.
Dr Reed	6306	8 February	Jasmine Kerr	A therapist who speaks with Leah Barnes (Ela-May Demircan) following the death of Ella Richardson (Erin Palmer).
Leech	6313–6314	19–20 February	Jake Haynes	The cellmate of Romeo Nightingale (Owen Warner) who bonds with him during their time in prison. Leech is a drug addict and reveals to Kane that James Nightingale (Gregory Finnegan) is Romeo's father. Kane then purposefully gives Leech a dodgy stash of drugs causing him to overdose and die.
Demi	6323, 6334	4–19 March	Ainsley Howard	The stepmother of Arlo Fielding (Dan Hough) who arrives in the village asking money from Abe Fielding (Tyler Conti). Abe pays her off in order for Demi to leave. Abe and Demi later have a video call, revealing that Abe is aware of Arlo's whereabouts, something he had been lying about.
PC Harvey	6323, 6383	4 March–19 November	Lucy Lowe	A police officer who arrests Diane Hutchinson (Alex Fletcher) for driving under the influence of alcohol after she runs a red light. When Diane's husband Tony Hutchinson (Nick Pickard) attempts to claim he was driving and then destroy PC Harvey's dash-cam, she arrests him as well. Following a report of a domestic disturbance, PC Harvey arrives to interview Abe Fielding (Tyler Conti) and Cleo McQueen (Nadine Mulkerrin). In a separate appearance, PC Harvey arrests Rex Gallagher (Jonny Labey) for kidnapping Misbah Maalik (Harvey Virdi). She later arrests Ste Hay (Kieron Richardson) on suspicion of burglary.
Murphy	6330–6332, 6347–6352, 6363–6364	13 March–30 April	Rick S. Carr	An associate of Warren Fox (Jamie Lomas) who arranges a meeting for him with Kane where Warren learns that Ste Hay (Kieron Richardson) and James Nightingale (Gregory Finnegan) were responsible for the death of Warren's daughter, Ella Richardson (Erin Palmer). Murphy later joins Warren in kidnapping James and confronting him and Ste on the roof of a disused school. Freddie Roscoe (Charlie Clapham) sees Murphy following a tryst with Marie Fielding (Rita Simons) and confronts him, leading to Murphy threatening Freddie's daughter, Lexi. Murphy joins Ste in leading a siege at Sienna Blake's (Anna Passey) home, but during the invasion is accidentally shot by Maxine Minniver (Nikki Sanderson). After regaining consciousness, Murphy flees the scene. Warren pressure Ste to kill Murphy in order to keep him silent, but Ste instead smuggles Murphy out of the village. Murphy later returns to rob The Loft as revenge, and upon learning of him being alive, Warren pressure Ste to shoot Murphy. Ste relents in order to support his son, Lucas Hay (Oscar Curtis), leaving Warren to deal with Murphy.
Shirley	6339	26 March	Jasmine M. Stewart	A private investigator hired by Marie Fielding (Rita Simons) in order to find Arlo Fielding (Dan Hough). Shirley shows Marie and her son Abe Fielding (Tyler Conti) footage captured from Northern Ireland showing Arlo asleep at a pub.
Carol	6342	29 March	Helen Sheals	A social worker who visits Frankie Osborne (Isabelle Smith) after she attacks her mum, Suzanne Ashworth (Suzanne Hall). After seeing her twin brother, JJ Osborne (Ryan Mulvey), observing her, Frankie lies to Carol about her recent behaviour.
Ged	6349–6350	9–10 April	Matthew Koon	A personal trainer who meets Lucas Hay (Oscar Curtis) through a gay hookup app, and takes him to The Loft. Lucas decides against going home with Ged, leading to a confrontation. Carter Shepherd (David Ames) then steps in, telling Ged that Lucas is underage.
Chris	6352–6353	12–15 April	Andrew Dowbiggin	Chris is the father of Arlo Fielding (Dan Hough) and arrives in the village with his son unconscious. Chris meets up with Abe Fielding (Tyler Conti) to leave Arlo in his care, but he is knocked unconscious. Abe apologises the following day and convinces Chris to leave the village for France with Arlo in his care. Chris leaves the village, unaware that Arlo has been released from the car by Cleo McQueen (Nadine Mulkerrin).
Nurse	6356	18 April	Alicia Ambrose-Bayly	A nurse who does an appointment with Frankie Osborne (Isabelle Smith) after she is sexually assaulted by JJ Osborne (Ryan Mulvey). Frankie asks for the morning-after pill, but when the nurse asks further questions, she freaks out and leaves.
Welfare Officer	6367	3 May	Misha Duncan-Barry	A welfare officer who conducts a check to see how Arlo Fielding (Dan Hough) is coping living with Marie Fielding (Rita Simons). Although the visit goes well, Marie is disappointed when the welfare officer informs her of future visits.
Rob	6371	9 May	Macaulay Cooper	A drug dealer that Dilly Harcourt (Emma Johnsey-Smith) buys dodgy pills from resulting in the deaths of Lizzie Chen-Williams (Lily Best) and Hunter McQueen (Theo Graham). Dilly later arranges a meeting with Rob so that Hunter's brother, Prince McQueen (Malique Thompson-Dwyer) can confront him over the drugs. Dilly stops Prince from taking his life, but Prince later witnesses Rob meeting with Warren Fox (Jamie Lomas).
Priya	6372	10 May	Leah Baskaran	A counsellor seen by Frankie Osborne (Isabelle Smith) after Darren Osborne (Ashley Taylor Dawson) discovers a concerning drawing from her. Frankie confides in Priya about some of her night terrors and agrees to start regular sessions with her.
School Governor	6375	15 May	Roger Morlidge	A school governor who interviews Nancy Osborne (Jessica Fox) and Sally St. Claire (Annie Wallace) for the role of headteacher at Hollyoaks High. Although Sally believes she scuppers her chances due to her speech, the school governor and other board members are impressed and reappoint her to the position.
Carmen	6377	17 May	Katie Cotterell	A health visitor who looked after Lizzie Chen-Williams (Lily Best) when she secretly had a baby. Following Lizzie's death, Carmen meets with Cindy Cunningham (Stephanie Waring) to assist her in finding out the whereabouts of Lizzie's child.
Celebrant Janet	6381	23 May	Keddy Sutton	A celebrant who marries Joel Dexter (Rory Douglas-Speed) and Leela Lomax (Kirsty-Leigh Porter).
Midwife Coleen	6382–6384, 6483	24 May–5 November	Caroline Cookson	A midwife who does an ultrasound on Leela Dexter (Kirsty-Leigh Porter) when she stops feeling her baby moving. When it's discovered that Leela's baby has died, Coleen supports her, calling several of her contacts to attempt to bring them to the hospital and walking Leela through the process. Coleen is Leela's midwife when she gives birth to Clara.
Dr Tamworth	6382–6383, 6389	24 May–4 June	Christina Tam	A doctor who tells Leela Dexter (Kirsty-Leigh Porter) that her unborn baby has died. After Mercedes McQueen (Jennifer Metcalfe) worries about her own unborn twins, Dr Tamworth does a scan on her, confirming both babies are still alive.
Kaylee-Grace	6388	3 June	Eve Midgley	A girl at a dance audition who connects with Frankie Osborne (Isabelle Smith). Kaylee-Grace is impressed when Frankie's brother JJ Osborne (Ryan Mulvey) shows up claiming support, unaware of the abuse he puts Frankie through. Following the audition, Frankie and Kaylee-Grace exchange social media details.
Celebrant	6392	7 June	Wendy Patterson	A celebrant who marries Freddie Roscoe (Charlie Clapham) and Grace Black (Tamara Wall).
Dr Rogers	6393	10 June	Matt Connor	A doctor who treats Grace Black (Tamara Wall) after she stabs herself at her wedding. Grace manages to steal Dr Rogers's phone and proceeds to blackmail him into diagnosing her with a fake terminal illness so she can leave prison.
Harrison	6398	17 June	Josh Hart	A mortgage adviser that Cleo McQueen (Nadine Mulkerrin) arranges to meet in order to buy a flat with Abe Fielding (Tyler Conti). Abe gets jealous, believing that Harrison and Cleo are flirting, prompting him to reveal details about Cleo's eating disorder in front of Harrison.
Judge	6414	9 July	Alastair Kirton	A judge who declares Ste Hay's (Kieron Richardson) case over the hit-and-run of Ella Richardson (Erin Palmer) to be unsafe and releases Ste from custody.
Paramedic	6417	12 July	Katie Marie-Carter	A paramedic who assists Mercedes McQueen (Jennifer Metcalfe) and Warren Fox (Jamie Lomas) after one of Mercedes's twins is born with the umbilical cord wrapped around her neck.
Coach Andy	6420	17 July	Howard Corlett	A football coach who signs JJ Osborne (Ryan Mulvey) for United after meeting him and Darren Osborne (Ashley Taylor Dawson) at The Dog in the Pond.
Dr Middlesworth	6420	17 July	Olivia Fenton	A doctor who has an appointment with Tony Hutchinson (Tony Pickard), Diane Hutchinson (Alex Fletcher) and Ro Hutchinson (Ava Webster) about Ro's gender identity. During the appointment, Dr Middlesworth occasionally appears to be distracted, but offers to refer Ro to CAMHS) informing the family that waiting lists are up to two years.
Annie	6421, 6444	18 July–20 August	Claire Eden	A nurse at a care home looking after Martha Blake (Sherrie Hewson). After Sienna Blake (Anna Passey) delivers flowers to the care home, Annie intervenes after a small fight breaks out between Martha and Sienna. When Jeremy Blake (Jeremy Sheffield) later visits the care home, it's revealed he's bribing Annie to keep Martha there. Martha is later able to overpower Annie and inject her with a sedative.
Vicar	6427	26 July	Al Bollands	A vicar who oversees the funeral of Noah Dexter.
Male Escort	6447–6478	23–26 August	Joel Quinn	A male escort hired by Abe Fielding (Tyler Conti) to sleep with Cleo McQueen (Nadine Mulkerrin) after they agree to have an open relationship. Cleo rejects the escort, however, after seeing Abe and Theresa McQueen (Jorgie Porter) embracing, Cleo decides to hire him. After finding out that Cleo had slept with the escort, Abe humiliates her for doing so.
Police Officer	6453	2 September	Katherine Quinn	A police officer who does a home visit to tell Joel Dexter (Rory Douglas-Speed) that charges against him for providing a false alibi to Warren Fox (Jamie Lomas) were being dropped.
DS Thompson	6455–6456	4–5 September	Martha Cope	A police officer called to Hollyoaks High after Sally St. Claire (Annie Wallace) becomes concerned about Frankie Osborne (Isabelle Smith). JJ Osborne (Ryan Mulvey) sees the group and believes that Frankie is telling the officer about the sexual abuse he's put her through, prompting him to cause a disturbance and assault DS Thompson, leading to his arrest. At the police station, Frankie tells DS Thompson about the abuse and how it started.
Police Officer	6467	30 September	Tom Shaw	A police officer who arrests Freddie Roscoe (Charlie Clapham) after he assaults Robbie Roscoe (Charlie Wernham).
Paramedic	6468	1 October	Lauren Sturgess	A paramedic who treats Lexi Roscoe (Marnie Fletcher) after she suffers an epiletic seizure.
Photographer	6470–6472, 6490	7 October–20 November	Michael Saynor	A wedding photographer for Sienna Blake (Anna Passey) and Ethan Williams (Matthew James-Bailey) who witnesses the pair rowing. After Ethan's murder, Robbie Roscoe (Charlie Wernham) pays him off to claim that he saw Sienna push Ethan. Following pressure from Jeremy Blake (Jeremy Sheffield), Robbie calls the photographer back to retract his statement.
Andrew	6473–6474	14–15 October	Tom Coulston	A married couple who moved into James Nightingale (Gregory Finnegan) and Ste Hay's (Kieron Richardson) old home. After waking up from his coma, Ste believes Andrew to be James and breaks into the home. After discovering that Andrew isn't James, he demands to know where his husband is from the couple.
Wendy	6473–6474	14–15 October	Chloe Carter	A married couple who moved into James Nightingale (Gregory Finnegan) and Ste Hay's (Kieron Richardson) old home. After waking up from his coma, Ste believes Andrew to be James and breaks into the home. After discovering that Andrew isn't James, he demands to know where his husband is from the couple.
Kev	6476, 6480	21–29 October	Curtis Cole	A loan shark who Donny Clark (Louis Emerick) is assaulted by after failing to pay back money he owed him. Robbie Roscoe (Charlie Wernham) witnesses the altercation and later threatens Kev into leaving Donny alone.
Counsellor	6477	22 October	Krissi Bohn	A counsellor who does a session with Ste Hay (Kieron Richardson) over his belief that his husband, James Nightingale (Gregory Finnegan) is still alive. Ste shows the counsellor the 'evidence' he has collected and she plays along with some of his fantasies.
Mental Health Assessor	6490	20 November	Simon Hallman	A mental health assessor who allows Ste Hay (Kieron Richardson) to stay under supervision at his home following his psychosis diagnosis.
Father Patrick	6495	3 December	Dale Edwards	A priest who christens twins Maria-Carmella McQueen and Maria-Gabriella Fox-McQueen.
Jogger	6501	17 December	Neil Rowland	A jogger who finds Cleo McQueen (Nadine Mulkerrin) after she fakes her own death. The jogger offers her help before she runs off.
