= Episode 6465 (Hollyoaks) =

2024 episode of Hollyoaks

- Hollyoaks episode
- The ending scene involving Mercedes McQueen (Jennifer Metcalfe) was highly praised by critics and viewers.
- Episode no.: Episode 6465
- Directed by: Will Brenton
- Written by: Colin O'Donnell
- Original air date: 24 September 2024
- Running time: 20 minutes

Episode chronology
| ← Previous; Episode 6464 | Next → Episode 6466 |

Episode 6465 of the British soap opera Hollyoaks was first released on 24 September 2024. The episode featured the plea hearing of JJ Osborne (Ryan Mulvey) for the sexual abuse of his sister Frankie (Isabelle Smith). In the episode, JJ collapses, and it is revealed that he has leukaemia, which puts Frankie getting justice into doubt. The plot also involved Mercedes McQueen (Jennifer Metcalfe) finding out that her chemotherapy for her bowel cancer has not been successful and that she only has a year left to live if she is unable to get further treatment. The end of the episode sees Mercedes look in the mirror and confront her reality without her wig and with her stoma and scars on show. The scene was highly praised by critics and viewers and was shortlisted for "Scene of the Year" at the 2025 British Soap Awards. Metcalfe revealed that she was unable to watch the scene back as it was too emotional but hoped that it would raise awareness of the condition. Mercedes' storyline affected Metcalfe as her father had died from bowel cancer when she was a teenager and she believed that the storyline helped her deal with it. The episode also featured the departure of Leah Barnes (Ela-May Demircan).

== Plot ==
The Osborne family are getting ready for JJ Osborne's (Ryan Mulvey) trial but Frankie (Isabelle Smith) only just arrives home from going out the night before. John Paul McQueen (James Sutton) wishes his sister Mercedes McQueen (Jennifer Metcalfe) well for her chemotherapy appointment. Jack Osborne (Jimmy McKenna) tells Frankie that he believes he has gotten through to JJ to plead guilty for the trial. Dillon Ray (Nathaniel Dass) argues with Leah Barnes (Ela-May Demircan) about her decision to have her father Ste (Kieran Richardson) raise their baby instead of getting him adopted. Leah tells Dillon that there is nothing stopping Dillon from being the baby's father, but he says that he cannot as he does not want Leah's brother and his boyfriend Lucas Hay (Oscar Curtis) to find out he cheated on him.

Outside court, JJ asks Jack about what prison is like and Jack urges JJ to face what he has done. Leah comes to wish Frankie goodbye before she leaves to California and tells her that her dreams will be able to come true too. Frankie thanks Leah. At Hollyoaks High, John Paul tells his boyfriend Jez Blake (Jeremy Sheffield) how much Mercedes means to him and the family. Mercedes calls John Paul and keeps him on speaker phone whilst she speaks to Misbah Maalik (Harvey Virdi). Misbah tells Mercedes that her last round of chemotherapy has not shrunk the tumour on her liver and recommends a drug but warns that she may have to wait for it due to the shortage. John Paul cries as he hears the news and Mercedes tells Misbah to get her the drug after finding out that she has possibly a year to live if she does not get the treatment.

At the court, JJ collapses and is taken away by an ambulance. Frankie believes that JJ is faking it. Leah visits Ste, her baby and her aunt Leela Lomax (Kirsty-Leigh Porter) in the hospital. Ste reminisces and tells Leah that he is proud of her. Leah says that she wants to call her baby James in order to pay tribute to her deceased stepfather James Nightingale (Gregory Finnegan), which Ste and Leela approve of. Leah then says goodbye and leaves to go to university in California. Misbah calls Mercedes and says she has not been able to find the chemotherapy drug, which makes Mercedes cry and hang up before Misbah can talk about alternative treatments. At the hospital, JJ says that he was going to plead guilty but Frankie lashes out at him for the pain he has caused. It is then revealed that JJ has leukaemia. In the final scene, Mercedes looks in the mirror and faces her new reality before crying and dancing in the darkness to the playlist that her friends made for her.

== Production and development ==
Episode 6465 first streamed on Channel 4 at 7:00am on 24 September 2024 before airing on E4 at 7:00pm that same day. It was released on YouTube and for international screening on Tuesday 1 October 2024 at 5:00pm BST. The episode was written by Colin O'Donnell and directed by Will Brenton. The episode aired shortly after Hollyoaks's one year time jump.

Spoilers released in advance for the episode showed that episode would include JJ Osborne's (Ryan Mulvey) plea hearing for sexually abusing his sister, which would take a "shocking turn" when JJ collapses in court. JJ's father Darren Osborne (Ashley Taylor Dawson) and JJ's sister and abuse victim Frankie Osborne (Isabelle Smith) are full of "mixed emotions" as they see JJ being brought into an ambulance and the Osborne family are left in "turmoil" again. Inside Soap revealed that Frankie cannot believe how the events have played out after she has been waiting for JJ to face punishment for over a year and that she initially believes that JJ is faking it as one of his "wicked ploys" to evade justice and she cannot believe that he has managed to do so. Prior to JJ's collapse, the Osborne family is worried that Frankie's "reckless behaviour" and reputation for lying could count against her in court. It is then revealed that JJ has leukaemia. It had been teased by Inside Soap that what happened at the hospital in the episode could "change everything".

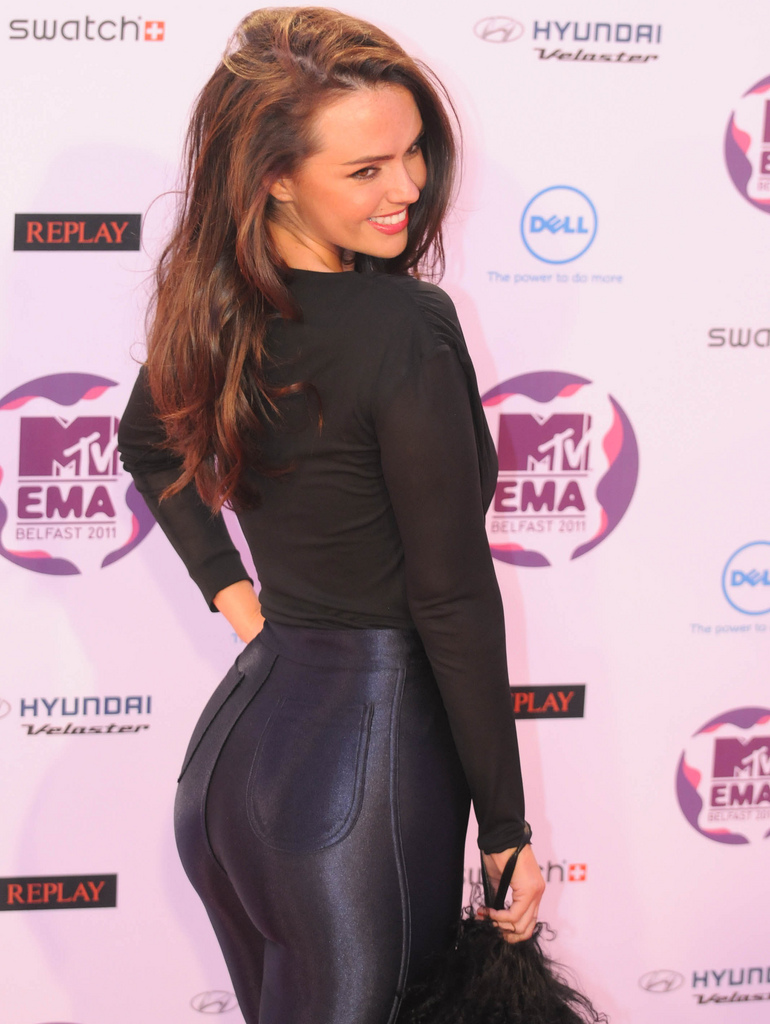
Jennifer Metcalfe portrays Mercedes, who has bowel cancer.

Spoilers also revealed that Mercedes McQueen (Jennifer Metcalfe) would be "feeling positive" about her chemotherapy results before she goes to the hospital. Inside Soap teased that the scenes would be "highly emotional" and that Mercedes would face what they termed her "toughest challenge to date". This was part of Mercedes' bowel cancer storyline, which had begun after the time jump. Metcalfe was glad that Mercedes had been chosen for the storyline as she believed that Mercedes sees herself as "invincible". Metcalfe also wanted to raise awareness and believed that the storyline showed that a cancer diagnosis could happen to anyone. The actress added that she felt that anything could be written for Mercedes as she is such a "free spirit" and believed that this was the boldest storyline that had been written for the character. Metcalfe's father died of bowel cancer when she was 15-years-old and thus the feelings she felt were "totally raw"; she believed that the storyline had helped her as she had never really dealt with her father's death, adding that she had to "dig a little bit deep into personal experiences". Metcalfe revealed that the storyline had changed parts of Mercedes' character; for example, Mercedes would be forced to reach out for help for her family and friends as she would find it to be physically impossible to juggle her illness with looking after her children, and that for the first time Mercedes would be seen to have strong friendships with other women. Metcalfe said that she would be open to talking to anyone about bowel cancer and that she would listen to anyone if they wanted to talk about the changes in their body that they experience or if they wanted to know where they can get tested. The episode featured Mercedes being told that her chemotherapy has not worked and she has up to a year to live without a specialist drug that is hard to source.

"I didn't know I had this in me until that day. I went into a totally different zone. It was really draining, but really rewarding. It could be the worst thing television's ever seen or the best, I don't know. But I hope what I felt came across."

–Metcalfe on the ending scene of the episode (2024)

The end of the episode featured an "intense" scene where Mercedes looks at herself in the mirror "vulnerable state" in her underwear, without her wig and with her scars and stoma bag showing, before she dances freely whilst crying to "incredible music" on a CD put together by her friends as she comes to terms with the news. Metcalfe was initially unsure how she would perform the scene. She found the scene rewarding and every emotion that could be felt, including "beautiful, awful, draining, amazing, special, exciting, sad [and] upsetting". Metcalfe explained that she used method acting for the scene, which she had not used for other storylines, and that she took herself to a "different world" when she was filming it. She revealed that the day of filming took seven hours in prosthetics and four hours to film and that she had to completely "zone out" of herself. The actress explained that the make-up she received for the scene made her feel so powerful "in the moment" and that she wanted to cry when she looked in the mirror as she could feel what her father and many others had gone through. She believed that the prosthetics team did an "incredible" job but she could not even look at herself due to it being "a lot". Metcalfe also explained that Mercedes gets strength when she looks at the picture of her children. Members from Inside Soap and other press teams watched the scene with Metcalfe and other cast members prior to the episode's release. Metcalfe said that she was not able to watch the scene with the team as she found it too much and so she looked at the floor instead, but she hoped it had brought the intended awareness.

Spoilers also hinted that there would be an "emotional goodbye" for another family. This turned out to be Leah Barnes (Ela-May Demircan), who says her goodbyes to Frankie and her family before leaving for university. The episode marked Demircan's last appearance in the soap after having been in the cast for years. The episode also featured Leah deciding to name her baby James after her deceased stepfather James Nightingale (Gregory Finnegan).

== Reception ==
The ending scene where Mercedes confronts her mortality was shortlisted for "Scene of the Year" at the 2025 British Soap Awards. It was also longlisted for "Best Showstopper" at the 2025 Inside Soap Awards.

Chloe Timms from Inside Soap wrote that she did not envy Darren as he was caught between his "abused daughter" and his "dying son". Timms' colleague, Sarah Ellis, called JJ's collapse a "shock twist" and questioned whether Frankie would ever get justice. Laura-Jayne Tyler from the same magazine put the ending scene as the "Bullseye" of British soap operas that week, writing that it was "about time" that Metcalfe got a storyline that "shows her acting abilities". Tyler revealed that she had watched the scene where Mercedes "bravely confronts her new reality" with Metcalfe and her co-stars, and added that the other cast members were "sobbing" at Metcalfe's "heartbreaking performance". Tyler called the scene "Raw and emotional" and opined that Metcalfe was her "queen". Daniel Kilkelly from Digital Spy speculated that JJ's collapse would "delay justice" and call JJ an "evil teenager". Kilkelly's colleague, Erin Zammitt, called JJ's diagnosis a "shock". Zammitt called the final scene "devastating", "emotional" and "powerful". Justin Harp from Digital Spy called Leah's goodbye "poignant" and noted how she paid tribute to her stepfather by calling her baby James.

Dan Laurie from Liverpool Echo called Mercedes being told that she only had a year to live "heart-wrenching" but also opined that the episode ended with an "uplifting moment" where Mercedes dances freely. Laurie reported how viewers were left "sobbing" by the scenes, with some viewers expressing their emotions on Twitter. Duncan Lindsay from Metro called the ending scene "one of TV's most powerful scenes" of 2024 and wrote that Metcalfe had delivered a "powerhouse performance" which he believed could be one of the best yet of her career. Lindsay believed that the "true pain and fear" of "feisty" Mercedes in her most vulnerable time was shown in the episode. He revealed that when he watched the scene with other cast members, everyone in the room teared up and was "captivated in a haunting silence". Lindsay also praised Metcalfe's "incredible acting", the "impactful writing, production and direction" and the "careful details on prosthetics" and believed that this combination helped the scene hit many emotions "ranging from sorrow and empathy for the character through to pride and strength towards her". He said that he believed that viewers cared a lot about Mercedes, as she had been a central character for nearly two decades and that many viewers would be about to relate to her experience.
