= Andre Clark =

Fictional character from Hollyoaks

- Hollyoaks character
- Portrayed by: David Joshua-Anthony
- Duration: 2023–24
- First appearance: 6 December 2023
- Last appearance: 5 September 2024
- Introduced by: Lucy Allan
In-universe information
- Occupation: Student
- Father: Mick Johnson
- Half-brothers: Leo Johnson
- Half-sisters: Gemma Johnson; Vicky Grant
- Uncles: Ellis Johnson
- Other relatives: Frank Johnson; Jerome Johnson

Andre Clark is a fictional character from the Channel 4 soap opera Hollyoaks, played by David Joshua-Anthony. The character and casting was announced in November 2023 and he made his first appearance on 6 December 2023. The role was Joshua-Anthony's television debut and he enjoyed playing the character. Andre was introduced as the surprise half-brother of established character Vicky Grant (Anya Lawrence). Andre comes looking for Vicky in order to start a relationship with her, but she initially flirts with him before she realises that they are related and she also feels resentment towards him, although she later overcomes it. Vicky and Andre's father Donny Clark (Louis Emerick) is later introduced to the soap and it is revealed that Donny is trying to track down a criminal who shot Andre years prior. Throughout his time on the soap, Andre acts as the confidant of Dillon Ray (Nathaniel Dass) and move in with his family. It was later announced that Joshua-Anthony would be leaving the soap and he made his last appearance in the episode airing on 5 September 2024. Andre was well-received by critics and the scenes where Vicky flirted with him were considered awkward.

== Casting ==
In November 2023, it was announced that David Joshua-Anthony had been cast on Hollyoaks as Andre Clark, the half-brother of established character Vicky Grant (Anya Lawrence). The role marked the television debut of Joshua-Anthony. Regarding his casting, the actor said, "Being welcomed into the Hollyoaks family has been amazing and I'm enjoying the process of playing Andre", adding that he could not wait to see what life in the Hollyoaks village "has in store" for his character. Andre was described as being charismatic, quick-witted and fun, with Joshua-Anthony describing him as "a kid who always thinks one step ahead of everyone else and is filled with so many thoughts and ideas". It was teased that Andre would "cause a stir" when he joins the established teenage characters and tries to reunite with Vicky, who is unaware that he is her estranged sibling. It was also revealed that Andre would be "sticking around for a while" and that he would befriend established character Dillon Ray (Nathaniel Dass) and move in with his family, the Maaliks, when they learn about his troubled home life. Andre's introduction was previewed in Hollyoaks's 2023 Winter trailer prior to his first appearance.

== Development ==
Andre's debut aired originally streamed on 6 December 2023. In his introduction, Andre aims to reunite with Vicky by befriending her and Dillon at the youth club, with Vicky initially unaware that they are related; it was teased that Vicky's lack of knowledge about their relation would lead to "awkward moments". After their initial meetup, Andre returns and tells Dillon that he is intending to move closer and start college in the Hollyoaks village. After Dillon introduces Vicky to Andre, she offers to guide him around the village, but she misreads the signs and tries to kiss him, with Andre pulling away. Andre reveals to Vicky that they have the same father, who Vicky has had nothing to do with her entire life. Explaining the backstory, Lawrence revealed that Vicky and Andre's father had relationships with two different women at the same time, and whilst Andre has had a proper relationship with his father, he has only recently found out about Vicky and decided to seek her out. Lawrence was shocked when she found out that Vicky had a half-brother as she believed that Vicky had no biological family other than her mother, and she was happy with this development as she felt that bringing in more family for Vicky was a "good investment" for the character. The actress explained that Vicky initially does not believe Andre when he reveals that they are related, but she is then angry and resentful due to Andre having had a "lovely home life" with a "wonderful family", which Vicky wishes she had also had. Lawrence added that she enjoyed working with Joshua-Anthony, calling him "bubbly" and "energetic", and revealed that the pair spent a lot of time together. The actress also said that she was helping Joshua-Anthony with settling into the soap and answered his questions.

When Andre returns, Vicky decides to tell her foster father Scott Drinkwell (Ross Adams) about Andre. Lawrence believed that Andre's arrival could potentially jeopardise Scott adopting Vicky due to Vicky finding out about her biological father making the process harder. When Vicky throws a party for the teenage group at the youth club, she is surprised when Andre appears. There continues to be awkwardness between the pair due to Vicky's earlier attempt to flirt with Andre. Spoiler pictures showed Dillon and Vicky hugging Andre, revealing that Dillon and Andre had become "fast friends". Vicky and Dillon welcome Andre on his first day of sixth form at Hollyoaks High. Throughout his stint on the soap, Andre acts as a confidante for Dillon. After encouragement from Dillon and Vicky, Leah Barnes (Ela-May Demircan) asks out Andre, who accepts; her half-brother Lucas Hay (Oscar Curtis) becomes jealous of the attention that Andre is getting and throws a drink over Leah, which makes Andre angry. Lucas particularly gets jealous when Dillon shows more attention to Andre than him. Vicky later suspects that Leah is using Andre after being rejected by Dillon.

Hollyoaks later introduced Louis Emerick as Donny Clark, Andre and Vicky's biological father. Emerick revealed that Donny cares for his children and that he had told Andre that he was responsible for his marriage breakdown when it was actually the mother's fault. In the storyline, Andre tries to sell random stock that he bought online in order to buy Vicky the "perfect" birthday gift, but he is disappointed when he finds out the stock is not high-end electronics and he is forced to be a "persuasive salesman". Dillon and Andre end up selling all of the stock and so Andre buys Vicky a sax player as her birthday gift. Andre is left disappointed when his father tells him that he will not attending Vicky's party. Lawrence was glad that Vicky had "warmed" to having Andre as her brother after initially struggling to accept that he had the "dream life" with their father that she had always wanted. Lawrence was proud of Vicky for getting over her initial resentment towards Andre. She also added that prior to Andre's arrival, Vicky had never thought about her biological father. Donny later turns up to Vicky's birthday party. Vicky initially thinks that Donny is joking about being her father, but she realises that Andre contacted him when he looks guilty. Lawrence explained that although initially it seems that Donny is not a good person and that he cheated on Andre's mother, the truth is not as simple and that not everything is his fault. Vicky ends up breaking down to Andre and tells him that all she ever wanted was a family.

Andre helps Donny with settling in and introduces him to Misbah. Donny moves to the village to be closer to Andre and Vicky but Misbah remains sceptical and is worried for Andre; she becomes further frustrated when Donny tells Andre that he cannot afford a house for them to live in and so they are invited by Misbah's husband Zain Rizwaan (Jonas Khan) to live with them. Vicky and Donny end up moving in with the Maaliks. After Zain collapses, Andre makes a mistake whilst caring for him which puts Zain in further danger, which leads to Andre feeling very worried. It is revealed that Donny is obsessed with catching a mysterious ganger called "Blue" who has been terrorising the Hollyoaks village. Amidst this storyline, a "mystery injury" is found on Andre when he and Leah decide to sell water guns in a park, which leads to Leah discovering a "bullet wound" on Andre. It is later revealed that Andre was accidentally shot by Blue when he was a child, which prompted Donny to relentlessly search for Blue.

In September 2024, it was reported that Joshua-Anthony had left his role as Andre and had already filmed his final scenes. The actor also removed mentions of Hollyoaks from his Instagram bio and the soap later confirmed the actor's departure. The actor's exit was amid various other cast departures due to the soap decreasing its quantity of episodes from five to three episodes a week, which led to more than 20 characters being written out of the soap. Andre's final episode aired in the episode originally released on 5 September 2024.

== Storylines ==
Dillon arrives to Hollyoaks looking for his sister, Vicky Grant (Anya Lawrence). He becomes friends with Dillon Ray (Nathaniel Dass). After Vicky tries to flirt with Andre, he reveals that his father, Donny Clark (Louis Emerick), recently found out about Vicky's existence and that he wanted to get to know her. Vicky is initially reluctant, but she comes round when Andre tells her that his aunt threatened to evict him if he did not stop seeing Vicky. Andre ends up moving with Dillon and his family and transfers to Hollyoaks High School. After encouragement from Dillon and Vicky, Leah Barnes (Ela-May Demircan) asks out Andre and he accepts, but her half-brother Lucas Hay (Oscar Curtis) becomes jealous of the attention that Andre is getting, particularly from Dillon, whom Lucas has romantic feelings for. Donny later moves to Hollyoaks, moving in with Andre and Dillon's family. It is revealed that Donny has been searching for criminal mysterious ganger called "Blue" as he accidentally shot Andre as a child. Andre later leaves the village.

== Reception ==
After the announcement of the character, Stephen Patterson from Metro wrote that he did "not see that coming" and believed that Andre would "make his mark" in the village. He also called Andre's introduction a "Major" twist. Erin Zammitt from Digital Spy called Joshua-Anthony's casting as Andre "exciting" and called his introduction to the soap a "family affair". She also believed that Vicky's attempt to flirt with him was "awkward". Pip Ellwood-Hughes from Entertainment Focus also called Vicky getting "the wrong end of the stick" about Andre "awkward". Johnathon Hughes from Inside Soap opined that Vicky meeting Andre was "a touch of Long Lost Family, but also noted that it was initially not a "happy reunion" for the pair. Hughes also called Andre an "Amiable newcomer" and questioned why Andre had decided to "suddenly" track Vicky down. Hughes also believed that Vicky flirting with Andre was awkward. Sophie Dainty from Digital Spy wrote that Andre had to become a "persuasive salesman" when he found out that the stock he bought was not high-end electronics. Her colleague, Daniel Kilkelly, believed that Andre was "quickly winning everyone over" and suggested that he could become "embroiled in drama" due to Leah potentially using him. Rebecca Sayce from the same website speculated that Andre's bullet wound could be linked to Donny's desire to catch Blue. Justin Harp from Digital Spy called the character's exit a "notable departure". Stephen Matterson from Metro opined that Andre's main storyline was reuniting Donny and Vicky. Katy Hallam from Birmingham Live believed that Andre's reunions with Vicky and Donny were "emotional".
