= Beau Ramsey =

Fictional character from Hollyoaks

- Hollyoaks character
- Portrayed by: Jon-Paul Bell
- Duration: 2022–2024
- First appearance: Episode 5964; 20 October 2022
- Last appearance: Episode 6431; 1 August 2024
- Introduced by: Lucy Allan
In-universe information
- Occupation: Chef; Barman; Teacher
- Father: Tony Hutchinson
- Mother: Sarah Ramsey
- Stepmother: Diane Hutchinson
- Half-brothers: Harry Thompson; Anthony Hutchinson; Ro Hutchinson
- Half-sisters: Grace Hutchinson; Morgan Osborne; Dee Dee Hutchinson (adoptive); Eva Hutchinson (adoptive)
- Grandfathers: Edward Hutchinson
- Grandmothers: Victoria Hutchinson
- Uncles: Dominic Reilly; Eric Foster
- Aunts: Verity Hutchinson; Eva Hutchinson
- Nephews: Isaac Thompson

Beau Ramsey is a fictional character from the British soap opera Hollyoaks, played by Jon-Paul Bell. Beau first appears in episode 5964, originally broadcast on 20 October 2022. Bell's casting and character details were announced on 6 September 2022 by Hollyoaks's former executive producer Lucy Allan. The newcomer was later revealed as the estranged son of the soap opera's longest serving character Tony Hutchinson (Nick Pickard). Beau's storylines since his debut in the serial consist of being revealed as the son of Tony, settling into the Hutchinson family and moving into The Dog in the Pond public house, his brief affair with Liberty Savage (Jessamy Stoddart) upon introduction, his relationships with Maxine Minniver (Nikki Sanderson) and Kitty Draper (Iz Hesketh) before murdering Kitty's conversion therapist father Declan Hawthorne (Alan Turkington) in self-defence after he held her hostage. Bell's portrayal of Beau received a nomination for "Best Newcomer" at the Inside Soap Awards 2023. In June 2024, it was reported Beau was set to leave the series, with his departure airing on 1 August 2024.

== Storylines ==
Beau arrives in the village and instantly strikes up a bond with Liberty Savage (Jessamy Stoddart) after saving her daughter Faith from Damon Kinsella's (Jacob Roberts) makeshift soda fountain at The Love Boat. They bonded over spiritually and shared a kiss. Liberty told Damon the truth and Beau is confronted by Damon and half brother Scott Drinkwell (Ross Adams), with Scott pouring a drink over Beau. He attempts to maintain a relationship with Tony Hutchinson (Nick Pickard) after telling Tony he is his biological father. Tony rejects the claim and branded Beau a conman. After giving Tony the backstory on how he and his mother met, it sparked memories in Tony's head and it was instantly revealed that Beau is Tony's son, but Beau then rejects Tony in retaliation. Tony ignores Beau after multiple attempts at gaining a father and after being so angry, he revealed it to all the customers in The Dog in the Pond public house, including Tony's wife, Diane Hutchinson (Alex Fletcher). Beau applies for a job at Hollyoaks High. He was offered the job but Nancy Osborne (Jessica Fox) catches him on an adult website and discovered he was fired from his previous job after an accusation came to light about him being in a relationship with a student. Beau explains it was a joke that was taken the wrong way, and when Nancy's son Oscar Osborne (Noah Holdsworth) is choking, Beau saves him. Nancy decides to keep quiet about why he was fired.

Beau supports his family through the death of his aunt Verity Hutchinson (Eva O'Hara) and Eric Foster's (Angus Castle-Doughty) siege of the village. Tony and Diane are struggling in their marriage during this time due to the family troubles. Diane tells Tony she no longer loves him and has a passionate dream about kissing Beau, freaking out when she wakes up as Beau is in the same room. He is asked to babysit Eva Hutchinson and he obliges as Beau is willing to do anything to support the family through the recent troubles. He is left smitten when Tony ropes in Maxine Minniver (Nikki Sanderson) to act as a childminder whilst Beau teaches at the school. Scott gives Beau a pep talk as Maxine is still struggling with body image issues after seeing Eric in prison. She plucks up the courage to ask Beau on a date and Beau agrees. Beau decides to tell her his true feelings on the date. Drugs are found behind the bar and Tony is horrified to learn they belong to Beau. Tony later learns Beau has taken the fall for Dave Chen-Williams (Dominic Power).

Beau begins a romance with Kitty Draper (Iz Hesketh) after an initial misunderstanding over an instagram photo. The two continuously flirt and Anthony Hutchinson (William Thompson) and Dee Dee Hutchinson (Lacey Findlow) write love notes for both of them from each other. They both arrange dates and begin to enter a relationship but Kitty is left devastated when Beau pulls away after a sexual advance. Kitty goes missing for two weeks, unbeknownst to Beau she has been kidnapped by her conversion therapist father Declan Hawthorne (Alan Turkington). He searches Kitty's bedroom for clues and he finds a photograph at a cottage of Kitty when she was a child. He finds her whilst she is held hostage and she tells him everything about her father and the reason she stole her travelling companion's identity during the Dee Valley Bypass crash in January. Beau is attacked by Declan. Beau regains consciousness and in a panic rage, murders Declan after slamming a thick children's nursery rhyme book over his head. Kitty checks his pulse and he is revealed dead.

Beau and Kitty overhear Sally St. Claire (Annie Wallace) and John Paul McQueen (James Sutton) discuss the police visiting the cottage where Declan is currently still laying in. Beau and Kitty agree to go and get rid of the body and evidence. Beau misses Hunter's funeral and buries Declan in the grave that Hunter is also buried in. They are caught by Freddie Roscoe (Charlie Clapham) and Beau discovers his fling with Kitty. The pressure is cracked up when Beau notices Zoe Anderson (Garcia Brown) is investigating Declan's disappearance. Tony and Diane also begin to apply pressure when they discover the truth behind Kitty's stolen identity and insist that she hands herself in. They are managed to be persuaded by Beau to let Kitty stay to support him. After days of not sleeping, Kitty tucks Beau in and he begins to freak out and start attempting to dig at the living room floor because "he is in Hunter's grave". He begins to have a mental breakdown as a result of the murder.

== Development ==
=== Casting and introduction ===
Hollyoaks announced the casting of Jon-Paul Bell on 6 September 2022. Bell was set to appear as "newcomer" Beau, who would arrive in the village in Autumn of that year. On his casting, Bell was delighted to be joining the soap and stated in a report: "Working on Hollyoaks has been an incredible experience and I'm so honoured to be a part of the passionate, creative, hard-working team here, I can't wait for viewers to meet Beau and follow him on his exciting new journey into the village, where he is sure to cause a stir for various well-known characters along the way." Beau's first appearance was depicted in episode 5964, originally broadcast on 20 October 2022. Bell later discussed his relationships with co-stars Nick Pickard (Tony) and Alex Fletcher (Diane). He said: "Nick is so full of life and energy, a great person to be around but seriously professional. The same with Alex, we've all been really close since I started." Bell also recognised Jimmy McKenna (Jack), adding: "And Jimmy McKenna, I love hearing his stories and having him serenade me with Frank Sinatra songs. Being on the show has been a dream come true so far – and I can't wait for it to continue."

=== Role in the Hutchinson family ===
On 18 October 2022, Hollyoaks announced a "mystery" stalker story for the longest serving character Tony Hutchinson (Nick Pickard). Tony's wife, Diane Hutchinson (Alex Fletcher), finds a bouquet attached with a note indicating a meeting. This alarmed Diane, leading her to suspect Tony is having an affair. The stalker was revealed to be "newcomer" Beau – no reasoning was given why for this decision as Beau had only debuted merely days before. Tony did not believe Beau at first when hearing that he was his son. The penny drops for Tony when he realises from vague details about his mother and her backstory that sparks memories for Tony. After avoiding Beau all day, Tony is called out by Beau and Tony is forced to tell a "shocked" Diane, leaving her "rocked". Fletcher later explained Diane's doubts about Beau. Gossip about the Hutchinson family was leaked into the newspapers and Diane believed it to be Beau. While Beau "categorically" refuses to have any part in the scandal, Tony demands they have a DNA test to prove whether Tony is biologically his father. Fletcher said: "Certain things in the article make them think information has been leaked to the press, Diane is suspicious Beau has done it. They barely know him. Tony has confided in him stuff about his life – and he might not even be his son. As soon as they mention posting it [the family photo] on social media, Beau doesn't want to take part. This fuels Diane's suspicions about him, and she tells Tony he should do a paternity test." Fletcher praised Bell for his portrayal in the role. She told Inside Soap: "He's brilliant and has really fitted in. Having another member of the family adds more layers to the dynamic of the Hutchinsons. We've been filming scenes for Christmas and it was so nice… it felt really natural with Jon-Paul being a part of the group. We all love him."

=== Relationships ===
In February 2023, Hollyoaks explored Beau's relationship with Diane, as the pair "get closer". Beau begins to spend large quantities of time with Diane – a comment made by Darren Osborne (Ashley Taylor Dawson) began to make Tony wonder whether the two may be having an affair. Tony accuses them of having an affair and Diane is outraged, telling him she did not carry any feelings for him. Beau accuses Tony of being controlling and Tony begs Beau for another chance. Diane, not as forgiving, goes to sleep on the sofa before having a dream where she passionately kisses Beau. Bell told Inside Soap he was "flattered" when finding out he would be featuring in a "saucy" dream sequence for Diane. He added: "That was hilarious. There's been a few dirty affairs for both Tony and Diane, but I hope I'm not going to get involved, especially while Beau is trying to make peace with his father. I don't think that would go down too well."

Hollyoaks producers hinted at a possible relationship for Beau and Maxine Minniver (Nikki Sanderson) as they begin to grow closer whilst babysitting Eva Hutchinson. Bell was delighted at the pairing, he told Inside Soap: "The strength Maxine showed throughout everything with Eric really caught Beau's attention. Potentially there could be something between them – he definitely has his eye on her." They go on a date after Maxine "plucks up the courage" to ask Beau. She is in a better head space on the date, but Beau tells her how he really feels.

==== Kitty Draper ====
"There's a sense of guilt and what could've been. It took a while for him to get his head around her being trans and be comfortable with that situation. His feelings for Kitty were strong and true, but he was worried about what people would think. Beau is a kind soul but can also be a people pleaser, focusing on what others think rather than what he wants."

— Bell on Beau's regret about ending things with Kitty

The production team for Hollyoaks hinted at a possible relationship between Beau and newcomer Kitty Draper (Iz Hesketh) in January 2024. The pair have a "flirtatious" time in The Dog in the Pond public house after a misunderstanding about an Instagram photo. Bell was "glad" storyliners explored Beau falling for a transgender woman, hinting at a darker side of Beau to soon come. On what attracts Beau to Kitty, Jon-Paul told Inside Soap magazine: "He really enjoys her energy – Kitty's been like a firecracker coming into the village and shaking things up! He's intrigued by the way Kitty lives her life, and it's brought Beau out of his shell a bit." He also added: "Kitty's past, and the reason she's landed in the village, could escalate into bigger problems down the line, Beau has strong morals, but he's also very empathetic, so this could lead to us seeing darker shades of his character. It's about how far he's willing to go." The relationship later ended after both of them couldn't make it work – Beau pulled away from Kitty's sexual advance, offending and "devastating" her. She believes this is because of her gender transition. Kitty is later kidnapped from her conversion therapist father Declan Hawthorne (Alan Turkington) in episode 6367, originally broadcast on 3 May 2024. Beau later becomes suspicious as nobody has heard of Kitty for two weeks. Inside Soap asked Bell if Beau was worried upon the realisation Kitty had been missing for weeks, he responded: "She's not replying to his messages so he does some digging, and finds out from Peri (Ruby O'Donnell) that Kitty never turned up for a course at work. Beau starts to panic and sneaks into her bedroom looking for clues to where she is. He finds a letter she's written, apologising for lying to everyone, and next to it is a picture of Kitty as a child at this cottage."

=== Murder of Declan Hawthorne ===
Continuing the development of Beau and Kitty's relationship, Hollyoaks producers implored a twist when Beau murders Kitty's conversion therapist father Declan Hawthorne (Alan Turkington) in a bid to prevent Kitty from enduring anymore abuse from Declan. Declan does not believe in Kitty's lifestyle as she is transgender. Beau discovers the truth about Kitty's identity and her backstory on why she is so inclined in escaping Declan. Beau and Kitty overhear a conversation between John Paul McQueen (James Sutton) and Sally St. Claire (Annie Wallace) where they learn the police will search the cottage. Beau and Kitty "prepare for a dark task", set to bury him alongside Hunter McQueen (Theo Graham). After burying Declan, they are caught by Freddie Roscoe (Charlie Clapham). The pressure increases when Beau learns of a police investigation. Detectives are "too close for comfort" as they interview Ro and Lucas Hay (Oscar Curtis). Police begin to search for Declan's "son" Ivan, unaware that Kitty was previously Ivan. This causes Beau and Kitty to destroy Kitty's belongings, but are caught by Diane. Tony and Diane also crack up the pressure on the lie when they give an ultimatum to Kitty – Tony and Diane would not call the police if Kitty agreed to hand herself in. As the family begin to notice the character change in Beau, they believe he is seriously ill. He refuses to say anything unless Kitty stays, to which Tony agrees. He later falls asleep and as Kitty goes to put the covers on him, he wakes up in a panic and start's screaming about being locked in "Hunter's grave".

=== Departure ===
The announcement of Beau's departure came to light on 21 June 2024. The Hutchinson family were set to "lose a member" as the "popular" actor would depart later in the year. This came months following the news that a third of Hollyoaks's production staff would be axed, including cast members, due to the reduction in Hollyoaks weekly episodes. Bell has not commented on his departure as of yet. Beau's final scenes were broadcast on 1 August 2024.

== Reception ==
For his portrayal of Beau, Bell was nominated for the "Best Newcomer" award at the Inside Soap Awards 2023, but lost out to Channique Sterling-Brown, who portrays Dee Dee Bailey in rival soap opera Coronation Street. Inside Soap branded Beau "the Hollyoaks hottie". They added: "Sweet, solid and steady, Beau Ramsey is the boy next door who never breaks the rules – but all that’s about to change!" Inside Soap also cited Beau as "the polite PE teacher". Stephen Patterson of Metro predicted Diane and Beau would have an affair whilst referring to the dream Diane had of herself and Beau kissing as "steamy". Justin Harp of Digital Spy labelled Declan's (Alan Turkington) murder scenes as a "violent end". Patterson (Metro) described the death of Declan as "brutal", "violent" and "grisly". George Lewis of Digital Spy dubbed Freddie catching Beau and Kitty after burying Declan in "shock scenes" as a "dramatic twist". His colleague, Divya Soni, dubbed the scenes of Beau's nightmare as "terrifying".

== See also ==
- List of Hollyoaks characters (2022)
