= Iz Hesketh =

British actress

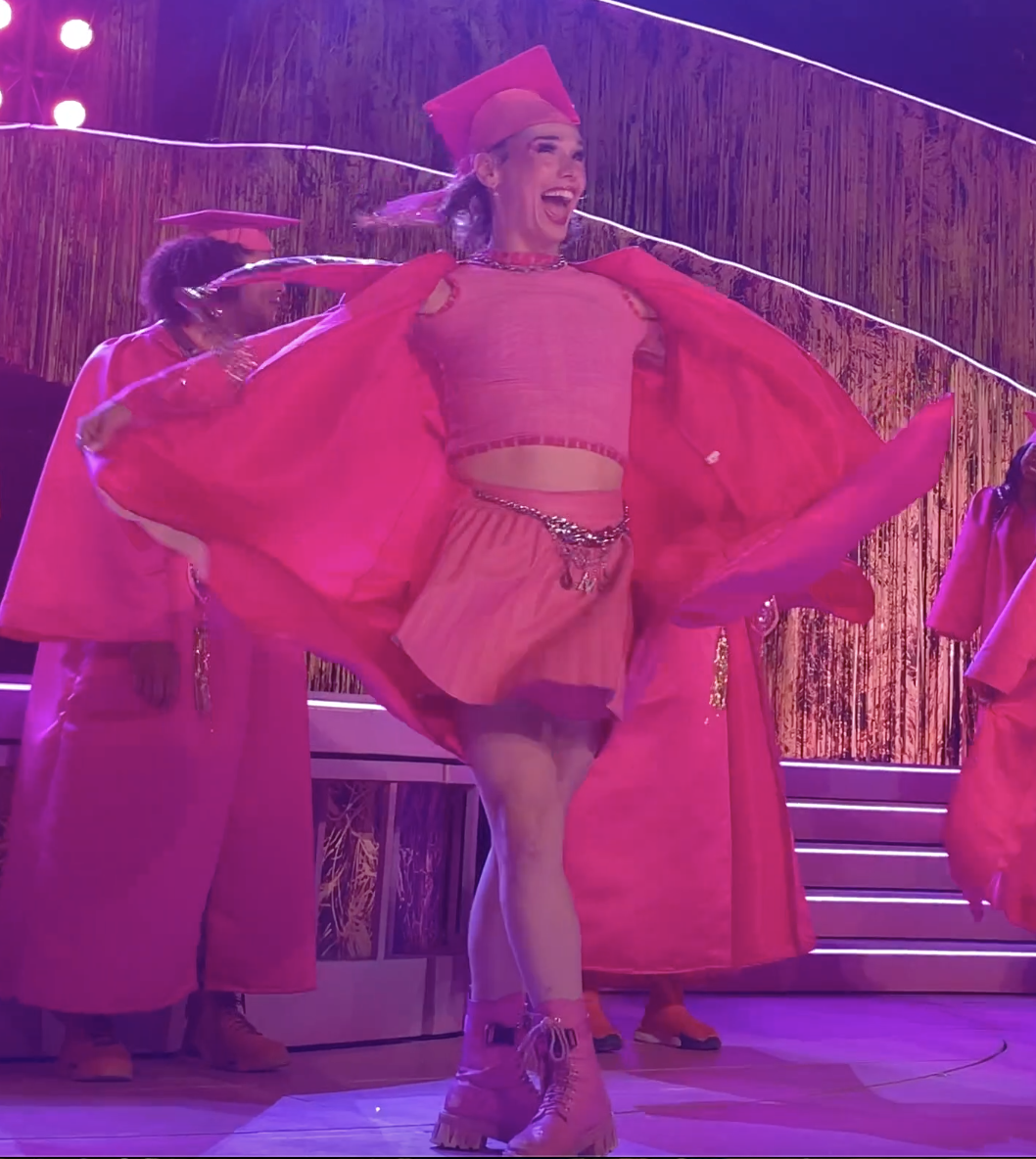
- Hesketh performing as Margot in Legally Blonde at the Regent's Park Open Air Theatre in June 2022
- Born: 22 September 1997 (age 29); England
- Education: Urdang Academy
- Occupations: Actress; drag queen
- Years active: 2018–present

Iz Hesketh (born 22 September 1997) is a British transgender actress and drag performer, best known on television for portraying Kitty Draper in long-running British soap opera Hollyoaks and Zee Malone in the 2026 miniseries Tip Toe On stage she has portrayed Margot in Legally Blonde at Regent's Park Open Air Theatre, originating the role of Pythio in Europe in Head Over Heels at the Hope Mill Theatre, Manchester and performing as her drag persona Seriah Sis.

== Career ==
After graduating from Urdang Academy, Hesketh embarked on the UK/European Tour of The Book of Mormon in which she toured across five venues: Palace Theatre (Manchester), Theater 11 (Zürich), Sunderland Empire, Bristol Hippodrome, and Birmingham Hippodrome from June 2019 to March 2020 when the tour was interrupted by the COVID-19 pandemic. During the COVID-19 lockdown, Hesketh participated in (as her drag persona Seriah Sis) and won an online social media drag competition titled 'Lockdown Legends' hosted by Tia Kofi (her drag mother).

In 2020, Hesketh appeared in the ensemble cast of the musical Rent at the Hope Mill Theatre in Manchester. After opening in November 2020, the production had to close after five performances due to a newly imposed lockdown. However, online performances ran from 27 November to 20 December 2020 on the Hope Mill Theatre website. The show returned again to the Hope Mill Theatre in Summer 2021, with Hesketh also returning as a featured ensemble and alternate Angel for this iteration of the production.

In 2022, Hesketh played Margot in the revival of the musical Legally Blonde at Regent's Park Open Air Theatre. This marked the first time Margot was played by a trans non-binary actor in a professional capacity. In an interview with media outlet PinkNews Hesketh said "I can't quite put into words how grateful I am to be taking this huge step in musical theatre history". The production ran from May–July 2022.

In 2023, Hesketh appeared in the jukebox musical Head Over Heels, based on the music of The Go-Go's, as the principal character Pythio, an oracle to the fictional kingdom of Arcadia. The production ran from 26 January to 4 March 2023.

Later that year, Hesketh appeared in a new Weimar Republic-era Berlin musical Fury and Elysium at The Other Palace, playing Anita Berber. The production ran for two weeks in June 2023.

Hesketh also features on the live cast recording of Olivier-nominated autobiographical play My Son's a Queer (but What Can You Do?) and participated in the West End LIVE performance.

In January 2024, it was announced via the official Hollyoaks social media channels and Hesketh's Instagram that she would star as Kitty Draper in long-running British soap opera Hollyoaks. In March of that same year, Hesketh announced her role as Valerian in the British historical adventure television series Renegade Nell on Disney+. She was the first person to portray a non-binary character in a Disney live action series.

In mid-July 2024, Hesketh won the award for Best Newcomer at the RadioTimes.com Soap Awards 2024. When speaking to Radio Times, she revealed that winning the award felt "unreal" and went on to say receiving the accolade was "absolutely incredible, yeah I'm just buzzing".

Hesketh appears in Russell T Davies's 2026 drama series Tip Toe on Channel 4.

== Acting credits ==
=== Stage ===
Year	Production	Role	Venue	Ref
2018–2019	Aladdin	Ensemble	New Wimbledon Theatre	
2019–2020	The Book of Mormon	Elder Cross/Davis	UK/European Tour	
2020–2021	Rent	Featured Ensemble/Alternate Angel	Hope Mill Theatre	
2021	Cherry Jezebel	Pearl Reckless	Everyman Theatre, Liverpool	
2021	Snowflake	Olly	The Lowry	
2022	Legally Blonde	Margot	Regent's Park Open Air Theatre	
2023	Head Over Heels	Pythio	Hope Mill Theatre	
2023	Fury and Elysium	Anita Berber	The Other Palace	

=== Television ===
Year	Title	Role	Broadcasting Channel	Ref
2023	Buffering	Kaia	ITV2	
2024	Hollyoaks	Kitty Draper	Channel 4/E4	
2024	Renegade Nell	Valerian	Disney+	
2026	Tip Toe	Zee Malone	Channel 4	

=== Video Games ===
Year	Title	Role	Ref
2026	Clive Barker's Hellraiser: Revival	Sister of Mercy	

== Awards and nominations ==
Year	Award	Category	Role	Work	Result	Ref.
2024	RadioTimes.com Soap Awards	Best Newcomer	Kitty Draper	Hollyoaks	Won	
2025	Rainbow Honours	Celebrity LGBTQIA Champion of the Year	N/A		Nominated	
