= Jon-Paul Bell =

English actor

- Born: Jon-Paul Alexander Bell; 13 February 1993 (age 32); Blackpool, Lancashire, England
- Education: Arnold School; Arts Educational School; Manchester School of Acting
- Occupation: Actor
- Years active: 2013–present
- Known for: Hollyoaks

Jon-Paul Alexander Bell (born 13 February 1993) is an English actor. He is known for portraying characters in various soap operas including Emmerdale, Doctors and Coronation Street. In 2022, he joined the cast of the Channel 4 soap opera Hollyoaks as Beau Ramsey.

== Early life and education ==
Bell was born on 13 February 1993 in Blackpool, Lancashire, and studied at Arnold School before graduating in drama at Arts Educational School in London.

== Career ==
Bell made his acting debut in the ITV soap opera Emmerdale, appearing in three episodes as Austin Ascot. He also appeared in an episode of Love Matters as Gary. In 2014, he made his film debut as Luke Mauro in the war docudrama film Kajaki. He has also appeared in advertisements for McDonald's and William Hill. In 2015, Bell appeared in an episode of the BBC medical soap opera Doctors as Tony Milne, a police officer. In 2020, Bell returned to Emmerdale, this time in the role of Gwyn. In 2021, he returned to Doctors for a second time, portraying Liam Bright in the episode "Enough". In 2022, Bell appeared as Sunny in an episode of the Sister Boniface Mysteries. He then joined the ITV soap opera Coronation Street on a recurring basis as lawyer Ben Chancellor.

In 2022, Bell is set to appear in the miniseries Masters of the Air. In September 2022, it was announced that he was joining the cast of the Channel 4 soap opera Hollyoaks as Beau Ramsey. He will also appear alongside Coronation Street co-star Sue Devaney in the film Made in the Eighties.

In June 2024, it was announced that Bell had left Hollyoaks, with his character leaving the soap later in the year.

== Filmography ==
Year	Title	Role	Notes	Ref.
2013	Emmerdale	Austin Ascot	3 episodes	
2013	Love Matters	Gary	Episode: "Kitten Chic"	
2014	Kajaki	Luke Mauro	Film role	
2015	Doctors	PC Tony Milne	Episode: "The Hope"	
2020	Emmerdale	Gwyn	1 episode	
2021	Doctors	Liam Bright	Episode: "Enough"	
2022	Sister Boniface Mysteries	Sunny	Episode: "Song for the Dead"	
2022	Coronation Street	Ben Chancellor	Recurring role	
2022–2024	Hollyoaks	Beau Ramsey	Regular role	
2024	Masters of the Air	Sgt. John Burgin	Recurring role	
