= Anya Lawrence =

British actress (born 2004)

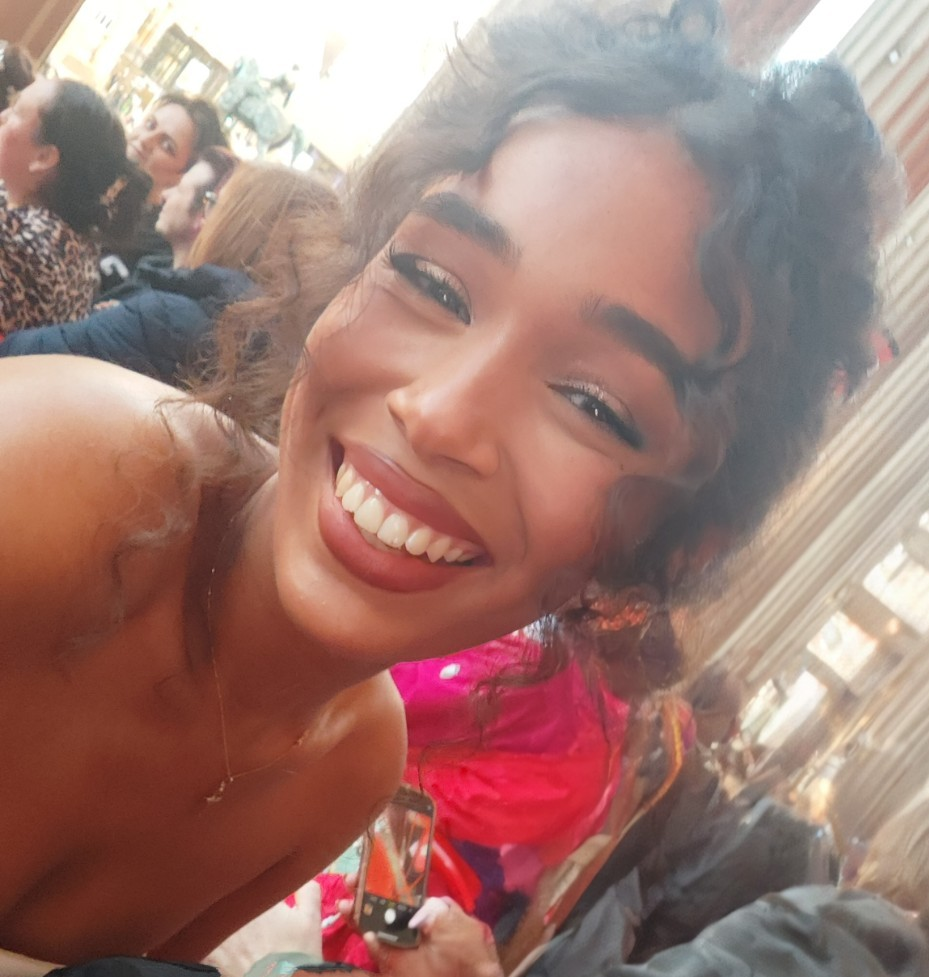
- Lawrence in 2025
- Born: 2004 or 2005 (age 20–21)
- Occupation: Actress
- Years active: 2017–
- Television: Hollyoaks

Anya Lawrence (born 2004) is a British actress. Lawrence took part in various projects before guest-starring in an episode of Creeped Out in 2017. In 2022, Lawrence was cast as Vicky Grant in the British soap opera Hollyoaks, which she was nominated for a British Soap Award for.

== Life and career ==
Anya Lawrence was born in September or October 2004. Lawrence and several of her family members are part of Ology Kids Casting, a specialist children's casting agency. In 2017, Lawrence was involved in a project regarding Manchester Tourism Board TVC. That same year, 12-year-old Lawrence portrayed Naini Ramona in Trolled, the third episode of the CBBC anthology show Creeped Out. Lawrence had three auditions for several roles in the show and was eventually cast as Naini, which was the role that she really wanted. Lawrence spent several days filming for the episode and had to be chaperoned on set. Lawrence felt lucky to be part of the show and really enjoyed her experience, saying that she learnt a lot and made new friends. In 2018, Lawrence was involved in projects for Lidl, TUI and Awkward World Photographic, as well as appearing in Channel 4's Class of Mum And Dad.

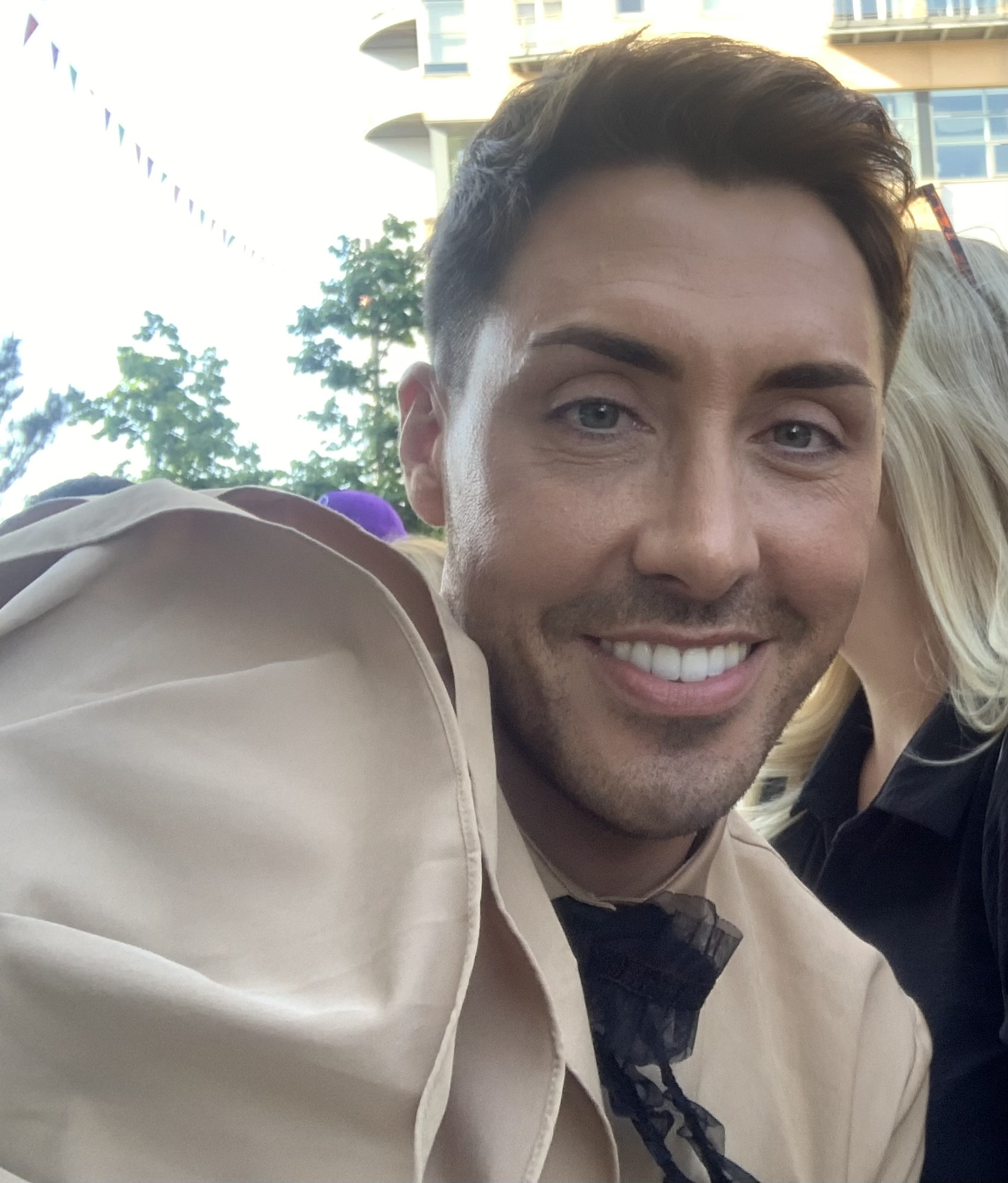
Lawrence was close to her co-star Ross Adams (pictured).

In April 2022, it was announced that Lawrence had joined the cast of the British soap opera Hollyoaks as Vicky Grant, the new foster daughter of established character Scott Drinkwell (Ross Adams). One of Lawrence's family members, Gabriel Lawrence, had previously appeared in Hollyoaks as Max McQueen. Anya Lawrence described Vicky as being a "whirlwind", "fierce" and "vulnerable" and enjoyed playing her, saying that she had come to "love" the character and was excited to see her "develop and grow". Lawrence later described Vicky as being the opposite of her, as she considered herself gentle in comparison to Vicky being feisty and sassy, and joked that she would be too scared to be friends with her in real life. Lawrence's debut on the soap aired on 2 May of that year. Lawrence was 17 when she began working on the soap. Vicky briefly left the soap in February 2023 but she returned to the soap two months later. Her brief exit made some viewers upset due to their love of the character. Lawrence revealed that she felt so happy when she returned to set and that she felt very bored and did not know what to do with herself during her two months off, although she did take her mother on a trip to Budapest, which she enjoyed. Lawrence also called Adams the "best thing ever" and revealed that they ran to each other screaming when she returned from her break. Lawrence revealed that she loves Vicky's wardrobe and that the clothes help her get into character. Lawrence revealed in 2023 that she was closest to Adams and Ellie Henry (who plays Freya Calder) in the soap, and she hoped to work with Jamelia and Ruby O'Donnell, who play Sharon Bailey and Peri Lomax respectively.

Vicky's storylines on the soap have included being her relationship with Scott, having a romance with DeMarcus Westwood (Tomi Ade), being an abusive relationship with Joseph Holmes (Olly Rhodes), collapsing after taking drugs, developing a feud with Sienna Blake (Anna Passey) over their love triangle with Ethan Williams (Matthew James-Bailey), the introduction of her biological father Donny Clark (Louis Emerick) and her half-brother Andre Clark (David Joshua-Anthony), a relationship with Robbie Roscoe (Charlie Wernham) and having an affair with his half-brother Freddie Roscoe (Charlie Clapham). Lawrence felt grateful to have Emerick play her onscreen father as he had a lot of experience of being in the industry and she felt grateful to be learning from him. Lawrence believed that Vicky was the happiest during her relationship with DeMarcus and added that she missed working with Ade, who had left the soap. The actress revealed that she was surprised that Vicky had a brother, but she enjoyed working with "bubbly" Joshua-Anthony and helped him when began working on the soap. Lawrence revealed that she has had difficulties doing kissing scenes with Wernham due to being much taller than him and joked that she got a "bad back" from leaning down. In 2024, Lawrence told Manchester Evening News that she felt grateful that Hollyoaks trusted her with the storylines and revealed that she was on set more than at her own home, which she was grateful for. The actress also wanted to explore Vicky's backstory and how being in the foster system had affected her. Lawrence told Inside Soap that she felt like Vicky was growing up with her, as the character had gone from being "innocent" to a "complete nightmare", and that she felt flattered when viewers called her the "new" Mercedes McQueen (Jennifer Metcalfe); she later added that whilst she was "obsessed with the character, she would not want to be her. In late 2024, Lawrence revealed that she had filmed the "heaviest thing" that she had done on the soap, which she called challenging but a privilege.

For her role as Vicky, Lawrence was shortlisted for the British Soap Award for Best Newcomer in 2023. That same year, Lawrence attended a charity lunch for Fortalice Bolton, a domestic abuse charity. In October 2025, it was announced that Lawrence had joined the cast of the new Hollyoaks Later episode that would air later that month for Hollyoaks' 30th anniversary. The episode was filmed on location and Lawrence described it as "gritty" and a "different show". The episode was broadcast on 22 October of that year. That same year, Lawrence appeared in Hollyoaks Does Come Dine with Me, a spinoff of Come Dine with Me, with other Hollyoaks cast members.

== Filmography ==
Year	Title	Role	Notes	Ref.
2017	Creeped Out	Naini Ramona	1 episode (Trolled)	
2018	Class of Mum And Dad	Herself	—	
2022–	Hollyoaks	Vicky Grant	Regular role	
2025	Hollyoaks Later	Vicky Grant	2025 special	

== Awards and nominations ==
List of acting awards and nominations
Year	Award	Category	Title	Result	Ref.
2023	British Soap Awards	Best Newcomer	Hollyoaks	Nominated	
