= Lucas Hay =

Fictional character from Hollyoaks

- Hollyoaks character
- Oscar Curtis as Lucas Hay (2024)
- Portrayed by: Jude Hawley (2009–2012); Reuben Thwaites (2012–2013); William Hall (2013–2022); Oscar Curtis (2023–present)
- Duration: 2009–2019, 2021–present
- First appearance: 3 April 2009
- Created by: Bryan Kirkwood
- Introduced by: Bryan Kirkwood (2009); Lucy Allan (2023)
- Spin-off appearances: Hollyoaks Later (2025)
In-universe information
- Father: Ste Hay
- Mother: Amy Barnes
- Stepfather: Doug Carter; John Paul McQueen; Harry Thompson; Ryan Knight; James Nightingale; Rex Gallagher
- Half-sisters: Leah Barnes; Hannah Hay-O'Connor
- Grandfathers: Mike Barnes; Danny Lomax
- Grandmothers: Kathy Barnes; Pauline Hay
- Aunts: Sarah Barnes; Leela Lomax; Tegan Lomax
- Nephews: James Barnes
- First cousins: Peri Lomax; Dee Dee Hutchinson; Daniel Lomax; Noah Dexter; Clara Dexter; Ro Hutchinson (adoptive)
- Other relatives: Steph Cunningham-Lomax

Lucas Hay is a fictional character from the British soap opera Hollyoaks, played by Oscar Curtis. Lucas is the son of Ste Hay (Kieron Richardson) and Amy Barnes (Ashley Slanina-Davies), and the half-brother of Leah Barnes (Elá-May Demircan) and Hannah Hay-O'Connor (Maddison Allen). He was born on-screen in episode 2530, originally broadcast on 3 April 2009. The character was of recurring status from 2009 to 2023, being portrayed by three different child actors, but the role was promoted to regular when the recast of Oscar Curtis was announced. Since the characters' recast, series producers Hannah Cheers and Angelo Abela placed Lucas at the forefront of a conversion therapy issue-based storyline that saw Lucas subsequently struggling to come to terms with his sexuality whilst being incorrectly influenced by his headteacher Carter Shepherd (David Ames) to hate homosexuality.

Lucas was previously portrayed by three different child actors, Jude Rawley from 2009 to 2012, Rueben Thwaites from 2012 to 2013 and William Hall from 2013 to 2022. Lucas' storylines in the serial include being in various custody battles between Amy and Ste, along with Leah; coming to terms with his mother's death; spiralling out of control whilst battling his sexuality after falling in love with his best friend Dillon Ray (Nathaniel Dass), being coerced into conversion therapy by his headteacher Carter and his friendship with Frankie Osborne (Isabelle Smith). Curtis' resemblance to Richardson, who portrays his on-screen father Ste and his own similar portrayal of Lucas have been noted by fans and various tabloids, whilst the pairing of Lucas and Dillon by writers has been dubbed "HayRay" by fans.

== Casting ==
On 17 January 2023, it was announced that the character had been recast from William Hall, who had played Lucas for nine years, to Oscar Curtis, an older actor, for an issue-led storyline which would test Ste as a parent and see Lucas befriending some of the village's other teenage characters. Curtis made his debut as Lucas on 15 March 2023. Curtis expressed his delight of the casting of Lucas, mentioning he felt "welcome" and "part of the Hollyoaks family. He also teased that viewers "can definitely expect drama, emotions and everything in the middle". Explaining the recast for Lucas, Allan told Inside Soap: "William Hall did a brilliant job for us, but we needed to cast someone slightly older for where the story was going. We're bringing in Oscar Curtis, who's the spitting image of Kieron aged 16! Lucas is getting to the age where he is difficult to manage, and he's grappling with his sexuality. There's also a new teen coming into the show in the form of Misbah Maalik (Harvey Virdi)'s nephew, Dillon Ray (Nathaniel Dass)."

== Development ==
=== Sexuality storyline ===
On 11 January 2023, the introduction of Dillon was announced. It was further reported on 19 January 2023 by executive producer Lucy Allan that Lucas would enter a storyline struggling to come to terms with his sexuality, days after the recast announcement. The plot would see Lucas fall for Dillon whilst questioning his own sexuality, and the recast of Lucas was part of the purpose. The storyline commenced in early December 2023, being dubbed "HayRay/Hayray" in the media. Lucas begins to question his sexuality when he begins to harbour feelings Dillon. He later lashes out at Dillon when he kisses Freya Calder (Ellie Henry) whilst playing spin the bottle to commemorate Ella Richardson (Erin Palmer)'s life, unbeknownst that his father Ste was behind the accidental murder. The pair almost kiss, but are caught by Scott Drinkwell (Ross Adams). Lucas asks Scott for advice on how to tell somebody you have contracted feelings for them, unbeknownst to Scott that Lucas was on about Dillon.

It was first reported on 22 April 2024 the culmination of the conversion therapy saga would end in Lucas violently attacking Dillon. The scenes would feature Dillon confessing his feelings for Lucas and in retaliation, Lucas then attacks him. The scenes aired in episode 6364, originally broadcast on 30 April 2024. Lucas, in a panic of the actions he just committed, self-harms which leads to both of their hospitalisations. The scenes were similar to the story of Romeo and Juliet. Dillon later denies Misbah's demand to report Lucas to authorities. In hospital, a powerful scene that displayed Lucas coming out to Ste garnered positive acclaim. He later admits to Dillon that he is actually gay. The two then enter a relationship, confirming a future for the both.

=== Conversion therapy ===
On 22 September 2023, Hollyoaks producers Hannah Cheers and Angelo Abela announced a "new long-running storyline" that would show Lucas, Dillon and John Paul McQueen (James Sutton) being "dragged in" to a conversion therapy group. The storyline in question would explore the dangers of conversion therapy. Hollyoaks writers and producers had collaborated with reporter Josh Parry, following his undercover work exposing the dangerous conversion practices of a church in Anfield, Liverpool. Parry has worked closely with the Hollyoaks teams, advising on scripts and the overall storyline, to reflect the realities faced by LGBTQ+ people forced to suffer in silence by these groups. Parry said: "It’s been an honour to be asked to guide the team through this complex and sensitive storyline. As someone who themselves has been through gay conversion therapy as an undercover reporter, I have experienced first-hand the misleading and often damaging claims made by so-called conversion therapists. I think Hollyoaks is the perfect platform to bring the reality of these practices to life so that the public can better understand them and the impact they can have. The team has put so much effort into making the storyline engaging and entertaining but above-all accurate and realistic on what is an extremely emotive topic." Channel 4 commissioning executive Ben Wadey added that the goal of the storyline is to shed light on an issue that occurs more frequently than many realise.

"It is a practice that is devastating and tends to affect the most vulnerable in the community, young people coming out or exploring their sexuality which is why it is vital that Hollyoaks' audience, with its youthful demographic, are fully informed. Through our established characters and the recent arrival of Carter we will look at this devastating practise and the various insidious forms that it can hide behind. Hollyoaks is well-known for never shying away from a subject that is agenda-setting and can help educate and inform and has a history of successfully telling difficult and important stories."

— Channel 4 commissioning executive Ben Wadey on the storyline (2023)

In scenes from episode 6277, originally broadcast on 28 December 2023, Lucas is targeted by conversion therapist headteacher Carter Shepherd (David Ames). Lucas is an easy target for Carter as he is facing difficulties at home and had been struggling to come to terms with his sexuality previously. Lucas is then subject to Carter's manipulation due to his vulnerability. The storyline then allows viewers to see Hollyoaks introduce Alan Turkington in the role of conversion therapist Declan Hawthorne, who would stir "quite an impact" on Lucas. It was reported on 21 February 2024 that Hollyoaks would air "disturbing" scenes later that week that introduced Declan into the serial. Declan quizzes Lucas on his relationship with Dillon, disapproving of his fathers lifestyle. This would be the start of months of manipulation, one notable scene caused fans to rage after Carter suggested Lucas' mother would be alive if it wasn't for the homosexual tendencies by Ryan Knight (Duncan James). After the months of manipulation, Lucas, at his breaking point suggests that they should incite an attack on the Pride festival, giving them a "pride to remember". The story reaches a climax when Carter plans to run with Lucas. John Paul and Hannah Ashworth (Emma Rigby) are then made aware of Carter's brainwashing of Lucas. Carter is confronted by Hannah and John Paul at pride. The storyline culminates with Carters' arrest.

=== Self-harm and friendship with Frankie Osborne ===
In scenes from episode 6320, originally broadcast on 28 February 2024, it was confirmed Hollyoaks would be pursuing a self harming storyline as a result of Carter's mounting pressure upon an already depressed Lucas. Lucas also starts a friendship with Frankie Osborne (Isabelle Smith) during this time as they are both self harming. Frankie is being sexually abused by her twin-brother JJ Osborne (Ryan Mulvey), unbeknownst to Lucas. JJ rapes Frankie and scared of a future pregnancy, she asks Lucas to obtain the morning after pill. They initially fail, however Lucas later gives her the contraception after he finds her in the park. She didn't reveal anything to Lucas, but just admitted that her first time was not a positive one. Darren makes a disturbing discovery when he finds Frankie's emergency contraception; he confronts her to no avail as she just claims she can not be protected. The plot then seen Lucas accused of the rape by Darren in Frankie's issue-led based storyline.

== Storylines ==
Lucas was born and delivered by Ste and his friend Daniel Raven's (Chris Hargreaves) wife, Abi Raven (Elaine Glover). His name, Lucas, was chosen by Ste. After his birth, Josh Ashworth (Sonny Flood) tried to stop Ste seeing Lucas, but Amy's sister Sarah Barnes (Loui Batley) blackmails Josh into handing Lucas over to Ste and Lucas moves in with Ste. In July, Amy and Sarah's father, Mike (Tony Hirst) found Ste asleep whilst caring for Lucas. As a result, Mike took Lucas and decided to look after him. Ste found Mike and taunted him about his family, Mike then hit him. The next day, Mike approached Abi about her interests in Ste and Lucas. Ste then told Mike that he would no longer be seeing Lucas and he was going to a solicitor. In August 2009, after weeks of drugging Ste, Daniel went behind Abi's back and interviewed a couple who hoped to adopt Lucas. Ste was pushed to the limit and almost shook Lucas, Daniel used this as an excuse to give him to the adopters. Sarah and Mike's ex-girlfriend Zoe Carpenter (Zoë Lister) help Ste as Abi took Lucas. Abi then made the decision to hand Lucas back to Ste. When a fire is set in Il Gnosh while Lucas and Leah are being looked after by Amy in the flat above, Steph Cunningham (Carley Stenson) saves them after the fire spreads. In 2012, Amy moves away from the village and takes Lucas and Leah to live with her. Lucas and Leah return to the village in December 2012 to stay with Ste, while Amy goes abroad with her new fiancée. Amy returns to the village in February 2013 after discovering Ste's relationship with Brendan Brady (Emmett J. Scanlan) she then leaves once more with Leah and Lucas, leaving Ste upset. Ste begins a relationship with John Paul McQueen (James Sutton) and they later get married in December 2014. They later separated and Ste later begins a relationship with Harry Thompson (Parry Glasspool). In August 2016, Amy returns with her fiancé Ryan Knight (Duncan James) and they begin battling custody of Leah and Lucas with Ste and Harry. In December 2016, Amy and Ryan won full custody and they keep Leah and Lucas away from Ste when they tell them not to see Ste. In March 2017, Amy and Ryan get married. The next day, Amy gets murdered by an unknown person and Ste gets arrested for Amy's murder. After Mike returned, he tells Leah and Lucas that Amy has died. In August 2017, when being looked after by Tegan, Lucas tells her that he saw Ryan with Kyle Kelly (Adam Rickitt), and Ryan lies to Lucas that he wasn't with Kyle. In September 2017, Amy's mother, Kathy Barnes (Sarah Jane Buckley), decides to take Leah and Lucas but they stay with Ryan, which leads to Kathy leaving the village. In November 2017, Ryan and Ste's half-sister Tegan Lomax (Jessica Ellis) tell Leah and Lucas that they are in a relationship and Leah and Lucas are worried when Tegan is going to replace Amy.

In 2023, Lucas' behaviour begins to spiral out of control. He is constantly getting into fights and practicing underage alcohol consumption; he is struggling with his sexuality as we see Lucas begin to start catching feelings for Dillon Ray (Nathaniel Dass). James Nightingale (Gregory Finnegan) believes Ste is being too easy on Lucas – tough love would be appropriate for the behaviour he has been portraying – however Ste doesn’t agree. James later locks Lucas in a shed in the bare middle of a woodland area in a bid to scare him. James also then gets physical with Lucas in an argument and Ste later finds out about this on Christmas Day 2023. Ste and Leela both publicly announce James' recent patterns of behaviour in the pub and Leela threatens James: he then moves out of the family's home. In December 2023, conversion therapist headteacher Carter turns his attention to Lucas, and starts pro-longingly starts to manipulate Lucas and then turn him against his sexuality.

In 2024, Lucas starts a friendship with Frankie. JJ is jealous of the male attention that Frankie has given to Lucas. Lucas later explains to Frankie that he self harms due to his hardships at home. She makes fun of his bible, which was given to him by Carter and he freaks out. He also still contracts strong feelings for Dillon, but is coerced by Carter into fighting his tendencies. He attacks Dillon at the pride festival where Carter is arrested for his crimes.

== Reception ==
Stephen Patterson from Metro branded the character brave. He also added that Lucas should be "protected at all cost" and the relationship between Lucas and Dillon is "true love in all its glory". The moment of Lucas and Dillon kissing was "heartwarming" for fans. The gay-conversion therapy storyline was nominated for "Best Storyline" in the Radio Times soap awards 2024.

For his role as Lucas, Curtis was shortlisted for "Best Young Performer" at the 2024 Inside Soap Awards, whilst Curtis and Dass were shortlisted for "Best Partnership" for their roles as Lucas and Dillon. Curtis was also longlisted for "Best Young Performer" at the 2026 Inside Soap Awards.
