= Oscar Curtis =

British actor and model (born 2005 or 2006)

- Born: Oscar Sam Curtis; 2005 or 2006 (age 20–21)
- Other name: Oscar Nicholls
- Occupations: Actor; Model
- Years active: 2017–present
- Television: Hollyoaks

Oscar Sam Curtis (also Nicholls, born 2005 or 2006) is a British actor and model. Curtis took acting classes and modelled for several photoshoots and promos between 2017 and 2022. Curtis appeared in the 2021 feature film Last Village on the Right, and in 2022 he guest-starred in an episode of Doctors. In 2023, Curtis took over the role of Lucas Hay on the Channel 4 soap opera Hollyoaks, where he was involved in a long-running storyline about conversion therapy. For his role as Lucas, Curtis was longlisted for "Best Young Performer" and "Best Partnership" at the 2024 Inside Soap Awards.

== Life and career ==
Oscar Sam Curtis, also known as Oscar Nicholls, was born in 2005 or 2006. He trained at Act Up North and also took acting classes at the Mark Jermin Stage School. Between 2017 and 2022, Curtis modelled for a variety of photoshoots and promos, including for Calvin Klein, Footasylum, Adidas, JD Sports and Vanity Teen. In 2020, he appeared in a commercial for Footasylum's Christmas Campaign. In 2021, Curtis appeared in the feature film Last Village on the Right. The following year, Curtis guest starred on the BBC soap opera Doctors as Finn Carson, a homeless teenager, in the episode originally broadcast on 3 October 2022.

In January 2023, it was announced that Curtis had been cast as Lucas Hay on the Channel 4 soap opera Hollyoaks, becoming the fourth actor to play the character. He took over the role from William Hall, who had portrayed Lucas from 2013 to 2022 on-off; the character was recast to Curtis so that he could tackle more mature storylines. It was teased that Lucas would have to navigate "difficult storylines" as he "goes through the trials and tribulations of student life", whilst executive producer Lucy Allan revealed that Lucas would have a "big love story" that she was looking forward to. Allan also believed that Curtis was the "spitting image" of Kieron Richardson, who portrays Lucas's father Ste Hay, when he was 16-years-old. Curtis felt welcomed at Hollyoaks, explaining, "the cast and crew feel like a real family. My first day was so exciting and I'm ready for the fans of the show to see the new Lucas. You can definitely expect drama, emotions and everything in between". Curtis later revealed that cast member Matthew James-Bailey, who portrays Ethan Williams, took Curtis "under his wing" despite the characters not having scenes together, with Curtis adding that he goes to James-Bailey if he ever needs any advice. Curtis enjoyed working with his on-screen family – consisting of Richardson, Gregory Finnegan (James Nightingale) and Elà-May Demircan (Leah Barnes) – and believed that their unit is "like an actual family".

Curtis debuted as Lucas in the episode broadcast on 16 March 2023. Between 2023 and 2024, Lucas was involved in a long-running storyline where he struggles with his sexuality and is groomed into conversion therapy, which was televised to bring awareness around conversion therapy. The storyline led to Lucas self-harming and later coming out to his family and starting a romantic relationship with his good friend Dillon Ray (Nathaniel Dass), whom Lucas had struggled with his feelings for. Lucas and Dillon's relationship gained a fan following. Curtis praised his working relationship with Dass, explaining, "Our off-screen chemistry reflects on-screen as we get on so well, I honestly couldn't do [my job] without him and that's the truth". For his role as Lucas, Curtis was longlisted for "Best Young Performer" at the 2024 Inside Soap Awards, whilst Curtis and Dass were longlisted for "Best Partnership" for their roles as Lucas and Dillon. Both of these nominations made the shortlist. In 2025, Curtis and Dass were shortlisted for the British Soap Award for Best On-Screen Partnership. In October 2025, it was reported that Curtis would also portray Lucas in the Hollyoaks late-night special Hollyoaks Later for the soap's 30th anniversary, which was broadcast on 22 October of that year. In 2026, Curtis took an extended break from Hollyoaks, returning to filming later that year; he went travelling during this break. Lucas's exit aired in March 2026, when Lucas was sent to prison, and his return originally aired on 1 September of that year. That same year, Curtis was longlisted for "Best Young Performer" at the 2026 Inside Soap Awards.

== Personal life ==
Curtis was cyberbullied for several months and had to involve the police. Curtis explained that "Being trolled started to take over my days", and revealed that his younger sister was also bullied in school. Because of his personal experiences with bullying, he is a strong supporter of anti-bullying causes and is also an ambassador for the Diana Award charity. In addition to acting and modelling, Curtis plays sports and previously played academy level football. In 2026, whilst on holiday in Mumbai during his break from Hollyoaks, Curtis was feeding monkeys and had to go to hospital to get vaccinated against rabies after one of the monkeys bit him, although he clarified afterwards that he was okay and did not get rabies.

== Filmography ==
Year	Title	Role	Notes	Ref.
2021	Last Village on the Right	Son of murdered Dad	Feature film	
2022	Doctors	Finn Carson	Guest role (1 episode)	
2023–	Hollyoaks	Lucas Hay	Regular role	
2025	Hollyoaks Later	Lucas Hay	Late night special	

== Awards and nominations ==
List of acting awards and nominations
Year	Award	Category	Title	Result	Ref.
2024	Inside Soap Awards	Best Young Performer	Hollyoaks	Shortlisted	
2024	Inside Soap Awards	Best Partnership	Hollyoaks	Shortlisted	
2025	British Soap Awards	Best On-Screen Partnership	Hollyoaks	Shortlisted	
2026	Inside Soap Awards	Best Young Performer	Hollyoaks	Pending	
