= Ela-May Demircan =

British actress

- Born: 2006 (age 19–20); Crewe, Cheshire, England
- Occupation: Actress
- Years active: 2011–
- Agent: Lime Management
- Television: Hollyoaks

Elá-May Melek Demircan (born 2006) is a British actress. She began portraying Leah Barnes on the Channel 4 soap opera Hollyoaks in 2011 when she was four years old. She has been nominated for several awards for the role, including at the British Soap Awards and the Inside Soap Awards. In 2024, it was reported that she would depart the soap to explore other acting roles.

== Life and career ==
Elá-May Melek Demircan was born in 2006 in Crewe, Cheshire. She is of Turkish descent. Demircan trained at the Helen O'Grady Drama Academy. When she was four years old in 2011, she was cast as Leah Barnes in the Channel 4 soap opera Hollyoaks. She had no previous acting experience and won the role after her first audition. Since Demircan debuted on Hollyoaks, Leah's storylines have included the murder of her mother, Amy Barnes (Ashley Slanina-Davies), her relationship with her adoptive father Ste Hay (Kieron Richardson) and her stepfather Ryan Knight (Duncan James), finding out that they are having an affair, almost dying after drinking too much alcohol, going through her "rebellious teenage years" and becoming a teenage mother, among others. During busy periods of filming, Demircan was schooled on set. Demircan's mother explained that her filming schedule differed each week, such as when she had to sit school exams, and that Demircan liked working with Richardson and James as they looked after her. Demircan said that her plans for the future were to write for television or become a media lawyer. It was also reported in 2017 that she likes to read. The following year, Demircan that her friends thought that it was "very cool" that she acted in Hollyoaks, which she believed was partly because they noticed her missing school and did not realise that she received tuition on set too. The actress also revealed that she wanted to carry on acting.

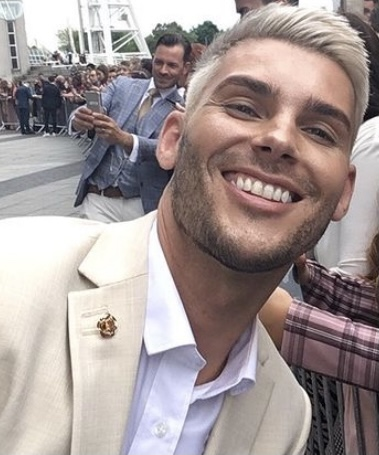
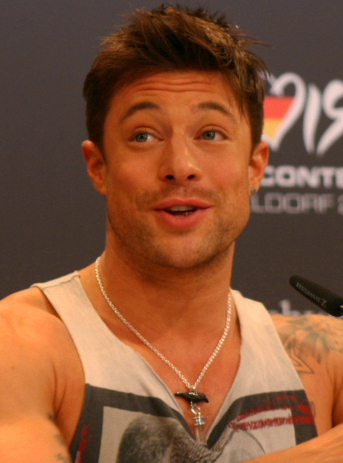
Demircan enjoyed working with Kieron Richardson (left) and Duncan James (right), who portrayed her character's adoptive father and stepfather, respectively.

In 2017, Demircan was shortlisted for "Best Young Actor" at the 2017 British Soap Awards for her role as Leah. Her mother told Crewe Chronicle that Demircan had found that she was nominated on her birthday and that it was the best day of her life, adding, "She cried when the producer told her. It meant everything to her as she puts her heart and soul into it. She’s really looking forward to the awards night and has had her dress made especially by a friend of mine who is a fashion designer". Later that year, she was nominated for the same award at the 2017 Inside Soap Awards. The following year, she was shortlisted for "Best Young Actor" at the 2018 British Soap Awards. In 2022, Demircan told Inside Soap that she was enjoying exploring more mature themes and found it exciting, explaining, "I've grown up alongside Leah, and getting to act out this new, rebellious side of her is so much fun. I'm excited every time I read the scripts". In 2023, she was longlisted for "Best Young Performer" at the 2023 Inside Soap Awards for her Hollyoaks role. The following year, she was nominated for the same award at the first Radio Times Soap Awards. That same year, when Good Morning Britain presenter Katy Rickitt guest-starred on the soap, she praised Demircan, calling her "nothing short of a little diamond" and "real pro who's submerged herself in her role since practically the moment she was born. I was learning from the best".

In August 2024, it was reported that Demircan would leave her role as Leah in Hollyoaks after 13 years. It was reported that Demircan was looking to move on and play other roles, although the actress did not confirm the news. The news came months after the announcement that several cast members would be axed from the soap due to Hollyoaks having to reduce the number and duration of their weekly episodes. Demircan's final episode as Leah aired on 24 September of that year. In 2026, it was announced that Leah would be returning to Hollyoaks, with the role now being played by Charlotte Riley; in response to the recast, Demircan said that Leah would "always be a part" of her, adding, "While I would have loved to have returned to the show, Hannah [Cheers, executive producer] saw Leah's character going in a different direction – but I will always be incredibly grateful to Bryan Kirkwood for casting me as Leah in the first place". Of the recast, Daniel Kilkelly from Digital Spy wrote, "We're sure there's a bright future ahead for Ela-May after her impressive performances over the years".

== Awards and nominations ==
List of acting awards and nominations
Year	Award	Category	Title	Result	Ref.
2017	British Soap Awards	Best Young Actor	Hollyoaks	Shortlisted	
2017	Inside Soap Awards	Best Young Actor	Hollyoaks	Shortlisted	
2018	British Soap Awards	Best Young Actor	Hollyoaks	Shortlisted	
2023	Inside Soap Awards	Best Young Performer	Hollyoaks	Longlisted	
2024	Radio Times Soap Awards	Best Young Performer	Hollyoaks	Nominated	
