= Rachel Croft =

British alternative rock singer-songwriter (born 1994)

- Rachel Croft performing live in 2024

Background information
- Born: 1994 (age 31–32); Nottingham, UK
- Origin: York
- Genre: Alternative rock
- Occupation: Singer-songwriter
- Instruments: Guitar, singing, piano
- Award: Caffè Nero's Artist of the Month
- Website: https://rachelcroftmusic.com

Rachel Croft is a British alternative singer-songwriter born in Nottingham in 1994 and based in London. Croft's music has featured on Netflix (Rebel Cheer Squad), BBC Two and CMT.

== Career ==
Croft started busking and performing at open mic events whist studying environmental geography at the University of York, playing covers, until April 2014 when she started writing her own songs after attending a Scott Matthews concert. In February 2024 she was named Caffè Nero's Artist of the Month.
