= Jessie Mae Alonzo =

British actress

- Born: 15 February 2003 (age 23); Nottingham, England
- Occupation: Actress
- Years active: 2016–present

Jessie Mae Alonzo (born 15 February 2003) is a British actress. Her films include Little Joe (2019) and Greatest Days (2023). On television, she is known for her roles in the Gold sitcom Newark, Newark (2022) and the Netflix series Everything Now (2023).

== Early life ==
Alonzo was born in Nottingham. She is of Filipino descent. She trained at the Central Junior Television Workshop. She played the lead in the Workshop's production of Emilia in 2020.

== Career ==
In 2016, Alonzo made her television debut in the second series of the CBBC series Hetty Feather. She later, in 2019, made her feature film debut in Jessica Hausner's Little Joe alongside Kit Connor.

Alonzo returned to television in 2022 when she played May in the Get Even spinoff Rebel Cheer Squad and Amber in the three-part Gold sitcom Newark, Newark. She was then cast as Debbie in the jukebox musical film Greatest Days, which premiered in June 2023. Later in 2023, Alonzo had a main role as Carli in the Netflix teen drama Everything Now.

On TikTok, Alonzo has gained 1 million followers and over 49 million likes.

== Filmography ==
Year	Title	Role	Notes
2016	Hetty Feather	Clara	2 episodes
2019	Little Joe	Selma	
2022	Rebel Cheer Squad	May	2 episodes
2022	Newark, Newark	Amber	Main role
2023	Greatest Days	Debbie	
2023	Everything Now	Carli	Main role
