= Harry Cadby =

British actor

- Education: London Academy of Music and Dramatic Art
- Occupation: Actor
- Years active: 2022–present

Harry Cadby is a British actor. On television, he is known for his roles in the BBC series Red Rose (2022) and Dope Girls (2025), and the Netflix series Everything Now (2023). His films include Little Bone Lodge (2023).

== Career ==
He trained at London Academy of Music and Dramatic Art. In 2022, he appeared in BBC One drama series Inside Man alongside Lydia West. He appeared in BBC 3 horror series Red Rose and British horror film Little Bone Lodge with Joely Richardson and Neil Linpow, prior to having a leading role in Netflix coming-of-age drama series Everything Now alongside Sophie Wilde, and written by Ripley Parker.

In February 2025, he had a leading role in the short drama film Heirlooms, about suicide bereavement. He had a small role in 2025 musical drama film O'Dessa. In 2025, he could also be seen in BBC One historical crime drama series Dope Girls. In April 2025 he was reported to be joining Brenda Blethyn and Emmett J. Scanlan in the Channel 4 reboot of the Barbara Taylor Bradford bestselling novel, A Woman of Substance. In 2024, he had joined the cast of Channel 4 thriller series In Flight, with the series broadcast in August 2025.

== Filmography ==
=== Film ===
Year	Title	Role	Notes
2023	Little Bone Lodge	Matty	
2025	Heirlooms		Short film
2025	O'Dessa	Elijah	

=== Television ===
Year	Title	Role	Notes
2022	Red Rose	Ciaran	5 episodes
2022	Inside Man	Ricky	1 episode
2023	Everything Now	Cameron "Cam"	8 episodes
2025	Dope Girls	Jimmy Conville	6 episodes
2025	In Flight	Sonny Conron	3 episodes
2026	A Woman of Substance	Gerald Fairley	4 episodes
