= Ashling O'Shea =

British-Irish actress

- Occupation: Actress
- Years active: 2015–present
- Television: Rebel Cheer Squad; Hollyoaks

Ashling O'Shea is a British-Irish actress. She initially completed a university degree in Theatre Studies before performing in various stage and screen productions. O'Shea was later cast as Rumi Joshi, a main character of the eight-part television series Rebel Cheer Squad, which was released in 2022. From 2022 to 2024, O'Shea portrayed regular character Nadira Valli on the Channel 4 soap opera Hollyoaks. Following her departure from the soap, O'Shea performed in The Lesson at Theatre503 in early 2024, and portrayed Ursula Wilson in the 2025 television series The Crow Girl. In 2025, O'Shea had a leading role in the King's Head Theatre play Puppy.

== Career ==
O'Shea loved acting and wanted to be an actor from a young age, but did not think it was likely to happen. She went to complete a degree in Theatre Studies at university and was planning to go into Theatre therapy as a career. O'Shea then began acting professionally and trained "on the job", taking affordable acting classes whilst also working other jobs. O'Shea began working with Little Fish Theatre company, which gave her first acting role outside of university.

"One particular stand-out highlight would probably be having Ramanique Ahluwalia as a love interest. We got to be what we never got to see when we were younger, we got each other through the hard parts and laughed our way through the rest. To be able to share that experience with another Queer woman of the Global Majority is something I will forever be grateful for."

–O'Shea on her highlight from Rebel Cheer Squad (2022)

In 2015, O'Shea portrayed the lead role of Rachel Corrie in the play My Name is Rachel Corrie at the Edinburgh Festival Fringe. The following year, O'Shea portrayed Sahira in a Rehearsed Reading of White at the Mercury Theatre, Colchester. Between 2017 and 2021, O'Shea performed in various theatre productions, including Keeping Faith, Dear Children, Sincerely, A Family Affair, Eris, A Missed Call Away and Chameleon, among others. The Irish play Eris was one of O'Shea's favourite theatre productions, due to being half-Irish herself and because it was performed at one of O'Shea's favourite theatres. In 2017, O'Shea portrayed Anna in the short film Screening, and she later played Cleo in one episode of the 2019 web series Bed&Bridget.

O'Shea made a guest appearance in the second series of the British medical crime drama Temple, which aired in 2021. That same year, O'Shea portrayed Ismene in Exeter Northcott Theatre's digital production adaptation of Antigone. O'Shea was also cast as a main character, Rumi Joshi, on the British teen thriller Rebel Cheer Squad, a sequel to Get Even. The drama consisted of eight episodes, which premiered on BBC iPlayer on 8 February 2022. The series was filmed at Bolton School.

In March 2022, it was announced that O'Shea had joined the cast of the British soap opera Hollyoaks as Nadira Valli, a matchmaker and love interest and old childhood friend for Shaq Qureshi (Omar Malik). O'Shea called joining the soap a "surreal" experience and had watched it growing up. O'Shea described Nadira as having "huge heart, a sarcastic mouth and a lot going on in her mind". O'Shea related to the character and was happy to be making the representation onscreen more authentic, adding that as a child she would not have believed that she would see a "Brown Queer woman playing a Brown Queer character" on a national television show.

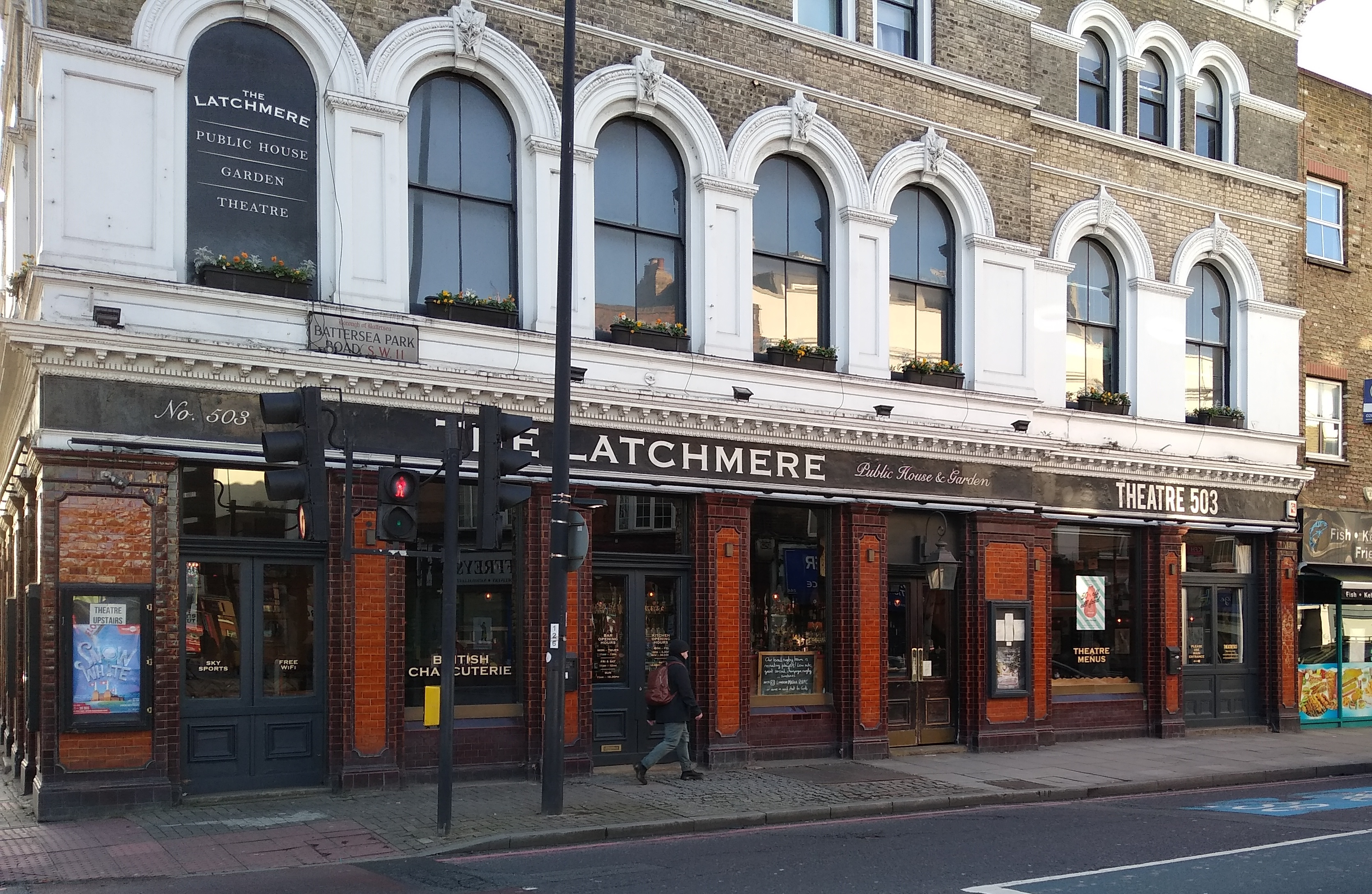
O'Shea performed at Theatre 503 in 2024.

O'Shea made her first appearance as Nadira on 24 March of that year. During O'Shea's time on the soap, Nadira's storylines on the soap have included her engagement to Shaq, an affair with Juliet Nightingale (Niamh Blackshaw), being outed on her wedding day, a romantic relationship with Lacey Lloyd (Annabelle Davis), being manipulated by Rayne Royce (Jemma Donovan), becoming a suspect in Rayne's murder and having a sexual encounter with Camilla Bassington-Hart (Dylan Morris). O'Shea also portrayed Nadira in a special Hollyoaks episode focussing on LGBTQ+ solidarity, which was broadcast in November 2023. Speaking about the episode, O'Shea explained in an interview that she was glad that the episode highlighted the experiences of LGBTQ+ people, especially as she is a Brown Queer woman herself. O'Shea, alongside her co-star Davis, later departed Hollyoaks and last appeared on 10 January 2024, with her exit not being announced beforehand. O'Shea was happy that her character had a "happy ending". When reporting on the departure, Asyia Iftikhar from PinkNews called Nadira and Lacey an "important LGBTQ+ couple".

Following her departure from Hollyoaks, O'Shea returned to theatre and portrayed "confident" character Kayleigh in The Lesson, which was performed at Theatre503 in early 2024. O'Shea also portrayed Ursula Wilson in the television series The Crow Girl, which was released in 2025. In 2025, O'Shea played the role of Jaz in the LGBTQ play comedy play Puppy, which was performed at the King's Head Theatre from 1–27 April 2025. O'Shea considered her experience "dreamy" and said that she related to her character's "search for community", adding, "As a queer brown woman there are plenty of spaces that have presented themselves to me as inclusive and safe, yet have turned out to be quite the opposite".

== Personal life ==
O'Shea is half Irish and also of Sri Lankan descent. She is queer. O'Shea enjoys cooking and considers herself a foodie.

== Credits ==
=== Filmography ===
Year	Title	Role	Notes	Ref.
2017	Screening	Anna	Short film	
2019	Bed&Bridget	Cleo	Guest role	
2021	Temple	Claire Harris	Guest role	
2021	Antigone	Ismene	Digital Production	
2022	Rebel Cheer Squad	Rumi Joshi	Main role	
2022–24	Hollyoaks	Nadira Valli	Regular role	
2025	The Crow Girl	Ursula Wilson	Television series	

=== Theatre credits ===
Year	Production	Venue	Role	Ref.
2015	My Name is Rachel Corrie	Edinburgh Festival Fringe	Rachel Corrie	
2016	White (rehearsed reading)	Mercury Theatre, Colchester	Sahira	
2017	Keeping Faith	Bechdel Theatre	Lana	
2017	17 to the Power of Three	Little Fish Theatre	Samreen	
2017	Dear Children, Sincerely	Project Ariadne	Krishanthi Kumaraswamy/ Journalist/ Little Girl	
2017	A Family Affair	Vienna's English Theatre	Zainab	
2018	Eris	Airlock, Bunker Theatre	Callista	
2018	Where the Lines Are Drawn	Little Fish Theatre	Amina/ Ollie	
2019	Andromeda	Nottingham Playhouse	Anida	
2019	Chameleon	Southwark Playhouse	Chameleon	
2020	A Missed Call Away	Southwark Playhouse	Jamie	
2021	Run(a)way	Young Vic	Mona	
2024	The Lesson	Theatre503	Kayleigh	
2025	Puppy	King's Head Theatre	Jaz	
