= Nico Parker =

British actress (born 2004)

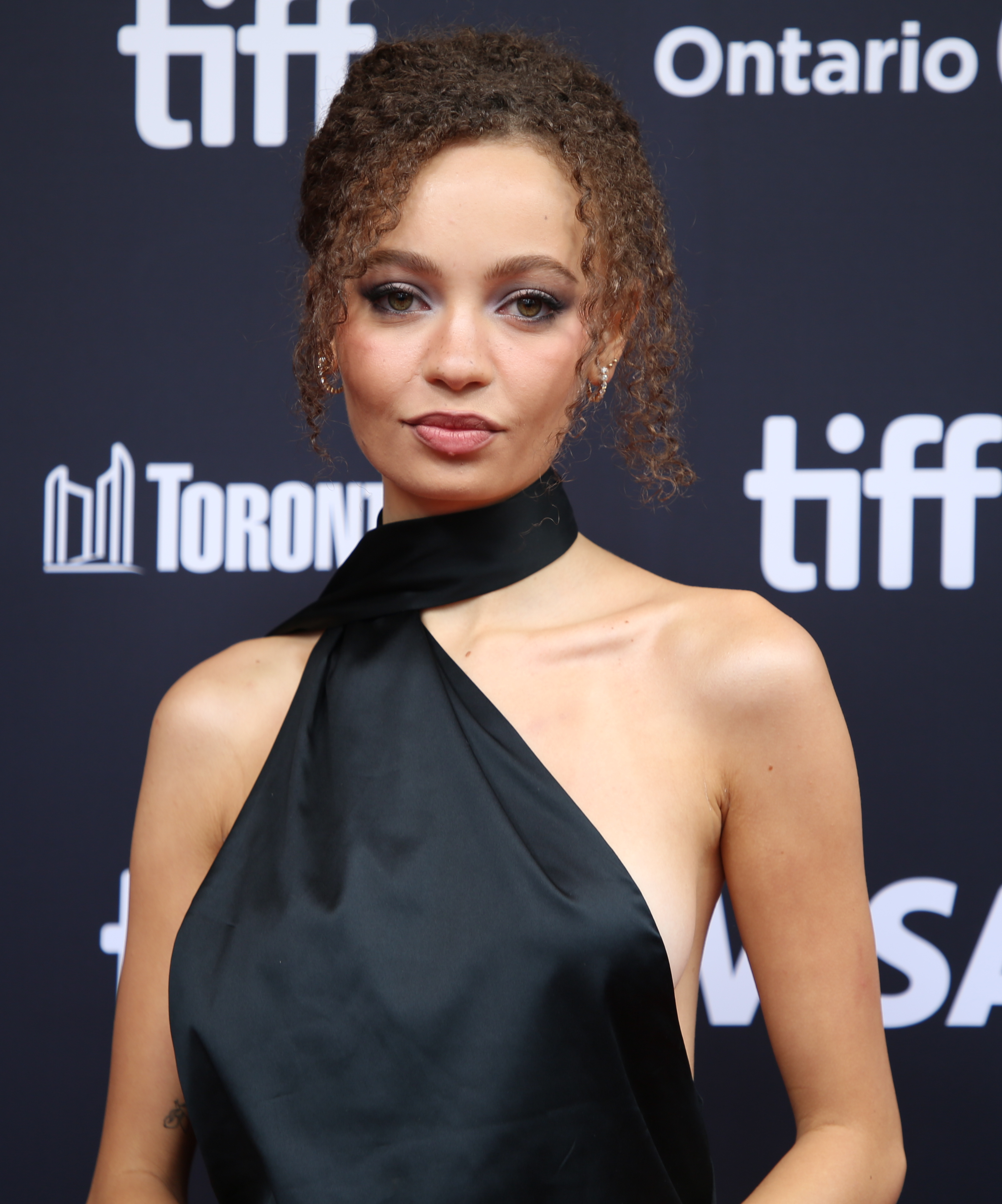
- Parker in 2025 at TIFF.
- Born: 9 December 2004 (age 21); Kensal Rise, London, England
- Occupation: Actress
- Years active: 2017–present
- Parents: Ol Parker (father); Thandiwe Newton (mother)
- Relatives: Ripley Parker (sister)

Nico Parker (born 9 December 2004) is an English actress. The daughter of actress Thandiwe Newton and filmmaker Ol Parker, she made her film debut in the fantasy film Dumbo (2019). She played Sarah Miller in the first season of the HBO series The Last of Us (2023) and Astrid Hofferson in the live-action fantasy film How to Train Your Dragon (2025).

== Early life ==
Born at home to film director and screenwriter Ol Parker and actress Thandiwe Newton, Parker is from Kensal Rise, North West London. She has an older sister, Ripley, and a younger brother. Through her maternal grandmother Nyasha Newton, she claims descent from a Zimbabwean line of tribal chiefs. Parker attended a private school in London. Her only acting experience prior to Dumbo was school drama lessons.

== Career ==
Nico Parker made her film debut as Milly Farrier in the 2019 film Dumbo, directed by Tim Burton. She was 11 when she auditioned for the role and 14 when the film premiered. Despite receiving mixed-to-negative critical reception for her performance, the role brought her widespread recognition. She next starred alongside Naomie Harris and Jude Law in the HBO miniseries The Third Day (2020) and appeared alongside her mother as Zoe in the science fiction film Reminiscence (2021).

In 2023, Parker played Sarah Miller in the first episode of the HBO adaptation of The Last of Us. Critics noted that the episode "benefits immeasurably from [her] endearing contribution". Rachel Leishman in a review for The Mary Sue called Parker's casting "brilliant" and said: "It’s such a good performance from Parker that matches the energy of Pascal's Joel in a way that I think many are going to be talking about Nico Parker's take on the character." Parker was named a 2023 Bright Young Thing by Tatler.

In 2024, she appeared in Suncoast. She won Breakthrough Performance Award at the 2024 Sundance Film Festival. In September 2024, Parker was announced as Lancôme's newest and youngest-ever Global Ambassador.

In August 2025, Parker was cast alongside Lola Tung in Osgood Perkins’ horror film The Young People.

In 2025, Parker appeared in Bridget Jones: Mad About the Boy, the live-action remake of How to Train Your Dragon. Parker’s casting as Astrid attracted online criticism because her appearance differed from the character’s depiction in the animated films. Parker later addressed the reaction, distinguishing reactions from fans who wanted a faithful adaptation from criticism rooted in opposition to inclusivity.

In 2025, Parker appeared as Dora Cassidy, the daughter of Leslie Mann's character in Poetic License, directed by Maude Apatow.

Parker is set to reprise her role as Astrid Hofferson in the live-action sequel How to Train Your Dragon 2, scheduled for release in 2027.

== Personal life ==
Parker is currently in a relationship with her Poetic License co-star Cooper Hoffman, the two met while filming the movie and reportedly fell in love.

Several weeks after production ended she visited Hoffman in New York where she met his mother, Mimi O’Donell, and Hoffman asked Parker to be his girlfriend.

== Filmography ==
Key
| † | Denotes films that have not yet been released |

=== Film ===
| Year | Title | Role | Notes | Ref(s) |
|---|---|---|---|---|
| 2019 | Dumbo | Milly Farrier | | |
| 2021 | Reminiscence | Zoe | | |
| 2024 | Suncoast | Doris | | |
| 2025 | How to Train Your Dragon | Astrid Hofferson | | |
| 2025 | Bridget Jones: Mad About the Boy | Chloe | | |
| 2025 | Poetic License | Dora Cassidy | | |
| 2027 | How to Train Your Dragon 2 † | Astrid Hofferson | Post-production | |
| TBA | The Young People † | TBA | Post-production | |

=== Television ===
| Year | Title | Role | Notes | Ref(s) |
|---|---|---|---|---|
| 2020 | The Third Day | Ellie | Miniseries; 3 episodes | |
| 2023 | The Last of Us | Sarah Miller | Episodes: "When You're Lost in the Darkness" and "Kin" | |

== Accolades ==
| Awards | Year | Category | Work | Result | Ref(s) |
|---|---|---|---|---|---|
| Black Reel Awards | 2024 | Outstanding Guest Performance in a Drama Series | The Last of Us | Nominated | |
| British Academy Television Awards | 2024 | Best Supporting Actress | The Last of Us | Nominated | |
| Sundance Film Festival | 2024 | Breakthrough Performance | Suncoast | Won | |
