= Shannon Murray =

Irish actor (born 1976)

- Born: 1976 (age 49–50); Dublin, Ireland
- Occupations: Actress; writer; media lawyer; consultant

Shannon Murray (born 1976) is an Irish-born actress, writer, media lawyer and consultant. She won the first ever search for a disabled model and was the first disabled model to feature in a high-profile advertising campaign for the British store Debenhams.

As an actress, Murray has appeared in a number of dramas for the BBC and Channel 4, such as Holby City and Casualty, and in 2017 appeared in the BBC Doctor Who spinoff series Class. In 2018, Murray appeared in three episodes of the BBC soap opera EastEnders as Sarah-Jane Spilsbury. In 2019, she appeared in an episode of Silent Witness, and in 2020, she appeared in Get Even as Mrs Baggott.

== Early life ==
Murray was born in Dublin and moved to London at a young age. She is the daughter of Frank Murray, who managed The Pogues and Thin Lizzy. She enrolled in drama classes at the Anna Scher Theatre from the age of 8. Murray was left paralysed from the waist down after a diving accident in Lanzarote when she was 14 years old and has since used a wheelchair. As an adult, she took courses with RADA as well as receiving personal coaching.
