= Nathan Foad =

British actor and comedian

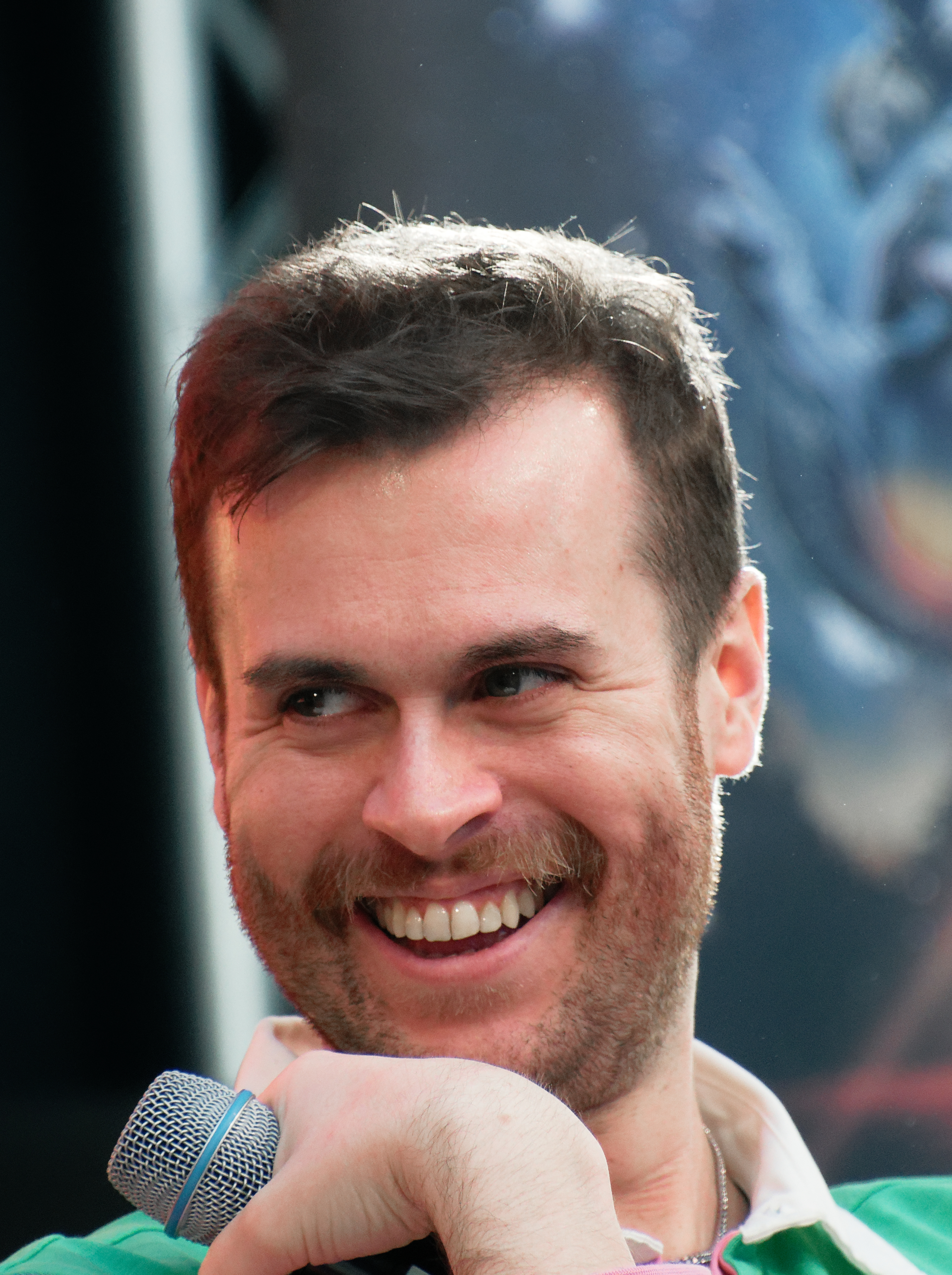
- Foad at ComicCon in 2024
- Born: 30 December 1992 (age 33); Nottinghamshire, England, UK
- Education: Guildford School of Acting (BA)

Nathan Foad (born 30 December 1992) is an English actor and writer known for Newark, Newark and Our Flag Means Death.

== Career ==
Foad graduated from Guildford School of Acting. Afterwards, he built his career as a comedy writer before gaining traction as an actor. In 2022, Foad created and wrote the British sitcom Newark, Newark. From 2022 to 2023, he played the role of Lucius in the HBO Max comedy series Our Flag Means Death. He also narrated the audiobook of Voyage of the Damned by Frances White. As of 2026, Foad currently works as a staff writer on Saturday Night Live UK.

== Personal life ==
Foad grew up in Newark-on-Trent; his first summer job was at his mother's fish and chip shop. Foad is gay, having come out to his family in his mid-teens. In an interview at the 2022 Chicago Comic & Entertainment Expo, Foad discussed that he has been in a monogamous relationship with his boyfriend for 9 years.

== Filmography ==
=== Television ===
Year	Title	Role	Notes
2021	Bloods	Spencer	
2022-2023	Our Flag Means Death	Lucius Spriggs	Main Role
2022	Newark, Newark	Rowan	Also screenwriter and executive producer
2022	Don't Hug Me I'm Scared	Toilet	Guest voice, Ep. 6
2023	Mandy	Kenny	Destination Dundee
2025	Death Valley	Owen Hart	Episode 5
2026	Things You Should Have Done	Perry	Episode 4
2026	Break Clause	Owen	3 episodes

=== Video games ===
Year	Title	Role	Notes
2027	Fable	Jacob	Voice

=== Accolades ===
Year	Award	Category	Nominee(s)	Result	Ref.
2022	Peabody Awards	Entertainment	Our Flag Means Death	Nominated	
