= Reminiscence (2021 film) =

Film by Lisa Joy

- Release poster
- Directed by: Lisa Joy
- Written by: Lisa Joy
- Produced by: Lisa Joy; Jonathan Nolan; Michael De Luca; Aaron Ryder
- Starring: Hugh Jackman; Rebecca Ferguson; Thandiwe Newton; Cliff Curtis
- Cinematography: Paul Cameron
- Edited by: Mark Yoshikawa
- Music by: Ramin Djawadi
- Production companies: FilmNation Entertainment; Kilter Films; Michael De Luca Productions
- Distributed by: Warner Bros. Pictures
- Release dates: August 11, 2021 (BFI IMAX); August 20, 2021 (United States)
- Running time: 116 minutes
- Country: United States
- Language: English
- Budget: $54–68 million
- Box office: $16.4 million

Reminiscence is a 2021 American tech noir thriller film written, directed and produced by Lisa Joy in her feature directorial debut. Starring Hugh Jackman, Rebecca Ferguson, Thandiwe Newton, Cliff Curtis, Marina de Tavira and Daniel Wu, it follows a man who uses a machine that can see people's memories to try to find his missing love. Joy co-produced with her husband and creative partner Jonathan Nolan.

It was released in the US by Warner Bros. Pictures on August 20, 2021, with a month-long simultaneous release on the ad-free tier of the HBO Max streaming service. It received mixed reviews, with critics praising its narrative ambition but comparing it unfavourably to similarly themed works like The Maltese Falcon and Inception. It was a box office bomb, grossing $16 million worldwide against a $54 million budget.

== Plot ==
In a partially flooded future Miami, climate change has forced most of the population to work at night. Recent war veterans Nick Bannister and Emily "Watts" Sanders operate a machine that allows clients to relive memories. One morning, a walk-in client, Mae, asks for their help finding her missing keys. On observing her memories of the night, Nick learns she is a nightclub singer, and feels a connection with her when she sings his favorite song, "Where or When". He begins a relationship with her, and when she disappears after a few months, he uses the machine repeatedly to relive memories of his times with her. Watts confronts him about this, but she also has a close attachment to Nick, an alcohol addiction, and an estranged daughter.

Nick and Watts use the same technology to help the state prosecution retrieve memories from suspects. In one such case, they discover that Mae was mistress to a New Orleans drug kingpin named Saint Joe, who addicted her to a narcotic called baca. These memories also reveal that a corrupt cop, Cyrus Boothe, worked for Joe, and that Mae stole a stash of Joe's baca before fleeing New Orleans for Miami.

Nick goes to New Orleans to confront Joe, who has no news of Mae. He tells his men to drown Nick, but Watts rescues him, killing Joe. Nick and Watts then use their memory machine to discover that Mae broke into the vault where they store clients' memories, and stole recordings of the memories of Elsa Carine, a client who relived trysts with Walter Sylvan, an older wealthy "land baron" who has recently died.

Nick's investigations reveal that Elsa had a son with Walter, but she was recently murdered by Boothe, and her son, Freddie, was kidnapped by Mae. After a confrontation, Walter's widow points Nick towards their location, where he and Boothe fight. Boothe almost drowns, but Nick rescues him and drugs him, then takes him back to his memory machine.

Boothe's memories reveal how he pressured Mae to seduce Nick and steal Elsa's memories: she researched Nick's background, and the lost keys were staged. Then they reveal how she came to love Nick, and how she took Freddie and fled to protect him from Boothe. Later, Boothe finds Mae and tries to force her to reveal Freddie's location. As Nick watches the memory of a speech Mae delivers to Boothe, he realises it is meant for him: she confesses her love for him, reveals the location of Freddie, then takes an overdose of baca and falls off a platform to her death.

Nick avenges her death by forcing Boothe to relive his worst memory of being burned by Joe's men. He also confronts Walter's legitimate son Sebastian, who hired Boothe to protect his inheritance. He then confesses to Watts that he intentionally "burned" Boothe's memories, a major crime. He is convicted, but is allowed to serve his sentence using his machine to relive his time with Mae thereafter. An older Watts reunites with her family, and watches Nick reliving a memory with Mae, in which he recounts a shortened version of the story of Orpheus and Eurydice, ending with the lovers reunited on their way out of Hades, but before the usual sad end of the story.

== Cast ==
- Hugh Jackman as Nick Bannister
- Rebecca Ferguson as Mae
- Thandiwe Newton as Emily "Watts" Sanders
- Cliff Curtis as Cyrus Boothe
- Marina de Tavira as Tamara Sylvan
- Daniel Wu as Saint Joe
- Mojean Aria as Sebastian Sylvan
- Brett Cullen as Walter Sylvan
- Natalie Martinez as Avery Castillo
- Angela Sarafyan as Elsa Carine

== Production ==
In 2013, Lisa Joy's screenplay for the film ended up on The Black List, an annual survey of the most popular unproduced screenplays. According to the survey, which polled over 250 film executives, her screenplay received 20 votes for "best" screenplay. In January 2019, it was announced that Joy would make her directorial debut with the film, which would star Hugh Jackman and Rebecca Ferguson. Jackman previously worked with producer Jonathan Nolan on The Prestige (2006). In March 2019, it was reported that Warner Bros. Pictures had bought distribution rights to the film. In August, Thandiwe Newton joined the cast. Daniel Wu, Angela Sarafyan, Natalie Martinez, Marina de Tavira and Cliff Curtis joined in October. In August 2020, Newton's daughter Nico Parker was also revealed to be in the cast.

Filming began on October 21, 2019, in New Orleans and Miami.

== Release ==
Reminiscence was released by Warner Bros. Pictures in the United States on August 20, 2021. It premiered at BFI IMAX on August 11, 2021. As part of its plans for all of its 2021 titles, Warner Bros. simultaneously streamed it on the HBO Max service in the United States for one month, after which it was removed until the normal home media release schedule period. According to Samba TV, an estimated 842,000 households streamed it over its first three days, and during the month it was seen in over 2 million US households.

Reminiscence was originally scheduled to be released on April 16, 2021, before the slot was replaced by Mortal Kombat and the former film was left undated due to the COVID-19 pandemic. It was later rescheduled for theatrical release in the US on September 3, 2021, and internationally on August 25, 2021. The US date was then moved to August 27 to avoid competition with Shang-Chi and the Legend of the Ten Rings, then again to August 20.

== Reception ==
=== Box office ===
Reminiscence grossed $3.9 million in the United States and Canada, and $12.5 million in other territories, for a worldwide total of $16.4 million. Variety estimated that it needed to gross around $110 million to break even.

In the US and Canada, it was released alongside PAW Patrol: The Movie, The Protégé, The Night House, and the limited release of Flag Day, and was projected to gross around $3 million from 3,184 theaters on its opening weekend. It made $675,000 on its first day and went on to debut to $2 million, finishing ninth at the box office—the all-time worst opening by a film playing in over 3,000 theaters, passing The Rhythm Section's $2.7 million debut in January 2020. It fell 59% in its second weekend to $792,408.

=== Critical response ===
On the review aggregator website Rotten Tomatoes, 37% of 199 critics' reviews are positive, with an average rating of 5.1/10. The website's consensus reads: "Although Reminiscence isn't lacking narrative ambition, its uncertain blend of sci-fi action and noir thriller mostly provokes memories of better films." Metacritic, which uses a weighted average, assigned the film a score of 46 out of 100, based on 43 critics, indicating "mixed or average" reviews. Audiences polled by CinemaScore gave the film an average grade of "C+" on an A+ to F scale.

Writing for Variety, Owen Gleiberman called the film "a perfectly calibrated two-hour mirage of things we've seen before" and said that, "it's very Blade Runner: The Streaming Series, with maybe a stray hint of The Godfather. Outside, the flooded Miami landscape, with buildings and byways still visible, evokes a kind of Waterworld Lite crossed with a Hunger Games sequel." Richard Roeper of the Chicago Sun-Times gave the film 2 out of 4 stars, and wrote "It's The Maltese Falcon meets Inception somewhere in the Vanilla Sky on the way to Chinatown in the inventive and ambitious but wildly convoluted and ultimately disappointing sci-fi noir Reminiscence, which careens this way and that, and this way and that, before running off the rails."

Writing for The Playlist, Nick Allen gave the film a B+, calling it a "gem" that was "packed with intellectual and emotional thrills." He praised Jackman and Ferguson's performances, noting that Ferguson had been "ramping up for a role just like this."

=== Accolades ===
Jeremy Peirson, Thomas Jones, Michael Babcock, Sarah Bourgeois, and Jessie Pariseau received a nomination for Outstanding Sound – Feature Film at the 2021 Hollywood Professional Association Awards. Reminiscence was also one of 28 films that received the ReFrame Stamp for 2021, awarded by the gender equity coalition ReFrame for films that are proven to have gender-balanced hiring. It was nominated for Best Action/Thriller TrailerByte for a Feature Film at the 2022 Golden Trailer Awards.

== See also ==
- List of directorial debuts
