= List of awards and nominations received by Thandiwe Newton =

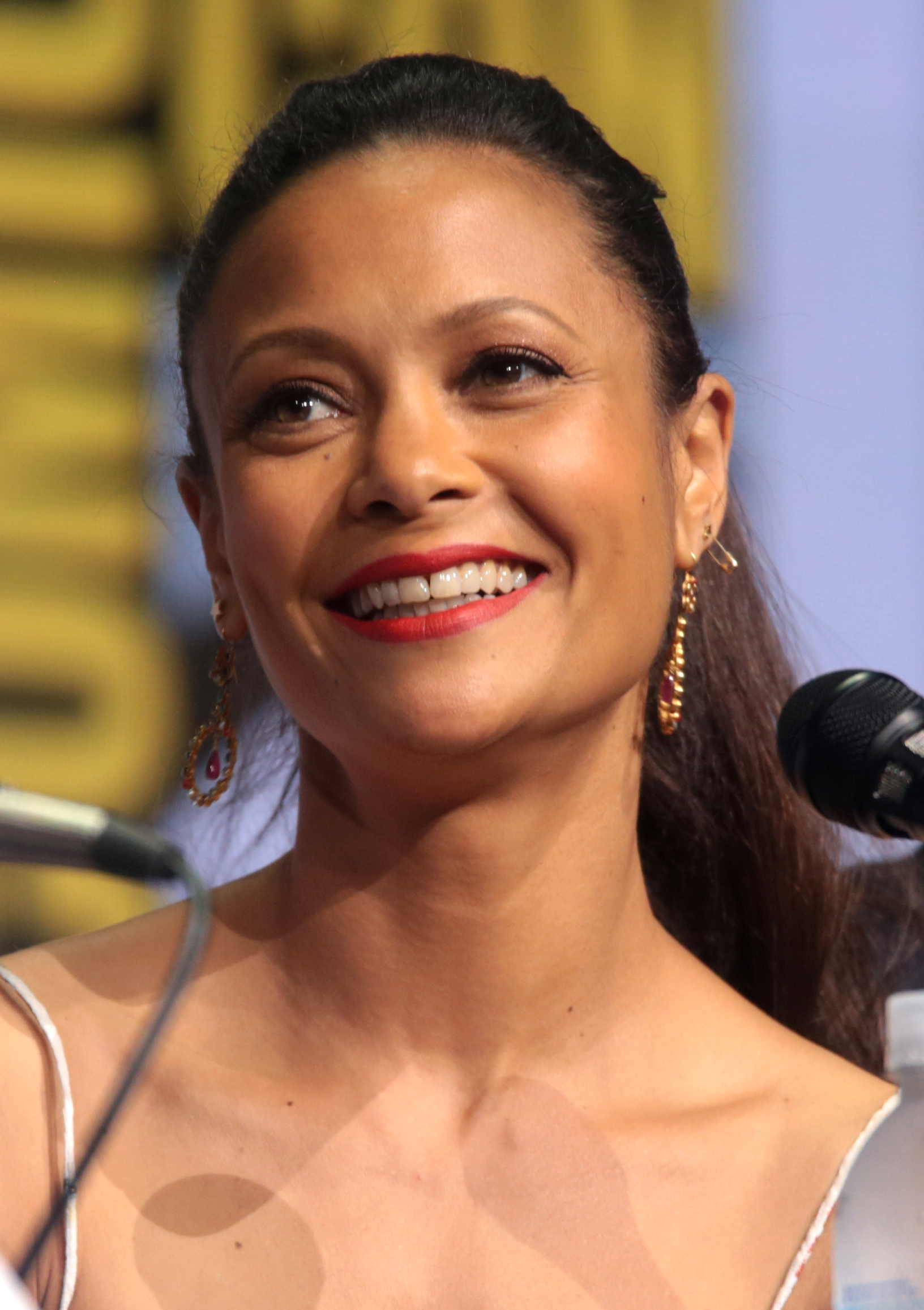
Newton at the San Diego ComicCon in 2017

Thandiwe Newton is a British actress known for her roles in film and television. She has received several accolades including a BAFTA Award, two Critics' Choice Television Awards, a Primetime Emmy Award, and a Screen Actors Guild Award as well as nominations for two Golden Globe Awards.

For her role as Christine Thayer, a woman molested by a cop, in crime drama film Crash she received the BAFTA Award for Best Actress in a Supporting Role. She portrayed Maeve Millay in the HBO dystopian-science fiction series Westworld from 2016 to 2022 for which she received the Primetime Emmy Award for Outstanding Supporting Actress in a Drama Series and two Critics' Choice Television Awards for Best Supporting Actress in a Drama Series. She starred in the BBC police procedural series Line of Duty for which she was nominated for the British Academy Television Award for Best Actress in 2019.

== Major associations ==
=== BAFTA Awards ===
Year	Category	Nominated work	Result	Ref.
British Academy Film Awards
2005	Best Actress in a Supporting Role	Crash	Won	
British Academy Television Awards
2018	Best Actress	Line of Duty	Nominated	

=== Emmy Awards ===
Year	Category	Nominated work	Result	Ref.
Primetime Emmy Awards
2017	Outstanding Supporting Actress in a Drama Series	Westworld (episode: "Trace Decay")	Nominated	
2018	Outstanding Supporting Actress in a Drama Series	Westworld (episode: "Akane no Mai")	Won	
2020	Outstanding Supporting Actress in a Drama Series	Westworld (episode: "The Winter Line")	Nominated	

=== Golden Globe Awards ===
Year	Category	Nominated work	Result	Ref.
2016	Best Supporting Actress – Series, Miniseries or Television Film	Westworld	Nominated	
2018	Best Supporting Actress – Series, Miniseries or Television Film	Westworld	Nominated	

=== Screen Actors Guild Awards ===
Year	Category	Nominated work	Result	Ref.
2005	Outstanding Cast in a Motion Picture	Crash	Won	
2016	Outstanding Ensemble in a Drama Series	Westworld	Nominated	
2016	Outstanding Actress in a Drama Series	Westworld	Nominated	

== Miscellaneous awards ==
=== BET Awards ===
Year	Category	Nominated work	Result	Ref.
2005	Best Actress	Crash	Nominated	

=== Black Movie Awards ===
Year	Category	Nominated work	Result	Ref.
2005	Outstanding Actress in a Supporting Role	Crash	Nominated	

=== Black Reel Awards ===
Year	Category	Nominated work	Result	Ref.
1998	Best Actress	Besieged	Nominated	
2002	Best Actress	The Truth About Charlie	Nominated	
2005	Best Ensemble	Crash	Won	
2005	Best Supporting Actress	Crash	Nominated	
2010	Best Ensemble	For Colored Girls	Won	
2010	Best Actress	For Colored Girls	Nominated	

=== Blockbuster Entertainment Award ===
Year	Category	Nominated work	Result	Ref.
2000	Favourite Female – Newcomer	Mission: Impossible 2	Nominated	

=== Broadcast Film Critics Association ===
Year	Category	Nominated work	Result	Ref.
2005	Broadcast Film Critics Association Award for Best Cast	Crash	Won	

=== Critics' Choice Television Award ===
Year	Category	Nominated work	Result	Ref.
2016	Best Supporting Actress in a Drama Series	Westworld	Won	
2018	Best Supporting Actress in a Drama Series	Westworld	Won	

=== Empire Awards ===
Year	Category	Nominated work	Result	Ref.
2000	Best British Actress	Mission: Impossible 2	Nominated	
2005	Best Actress	Crash	Won	

=== Gotham Awards ===
Year	Category	Nominated work	Result	Ref.
2005	Best Ensemble Cast	Crash	Nominated	

=== NAACP Image Award ===
Year	Category	Nominated work	Result	Ref.
1998	Outstanding Supporting Actress in a Motion Picture	Beloved	Nominated	
2000	Outstanding Supporting Actress in a Motion Picture	Mission: Impossible 2	Nominated	
2002	Outstanding Actress in a Motion Picture	The Truth About Charlie	Nominated	
2005	Outstanding Supporting Actress in a Motion Picture	Crash	Nominated	
2006	Outstanding Supporting Actress in a Motion Picture	The Pursuit of Happyness	Nominated	

=== Razzie Awards ===
Year	Category	Nominated work	Result	Ref.
2000	Worst Supporting Actress	Mission: Impossible 2	Nominated	

=== London Film Critics Circle ===
Year	Category	Nominated work	Result	Ref.
2005	British Supporting Actress of the Year	Crash	Won	

=== Phoenix Film Critics Society ===
Year	Category	Nominated work	Result	Ref.
2005	Best Cast	Crash	Won	

=== Satellite Awards ===
Year	Category	Nominated work	Result	Ref.
1998	Best Supporting Actress – Motion Picture	Beloved	Nominated	
2005	Best Cast – Motion Picture	Crash	Won	

=== Saturn Award ===
Year	Category	Nominated work	Result	Ref.
2016	Best Supporting Actress on Television	Westworld	Nominated	

=== Washington D.C. Area Film Critics ===
Year	Category	Nominated work	Result	Ref.
2005	Best Ensemble Cast	Crash	Won	
