= Little Joe (film) =

2019 film by Jessica Hausner

- Theatrical release poster
- Directed by: Jessica Hausner
- Written by: Jessica Hausner; Géraldine Bajard
- Produced by: Bruno Wagner; Bertrand Faivre; Philippe Bober; Martin Gschlacht; Jessica Hausner; Gerardine O'Flynn
- Starring: Emily Beecham; Ben Whishaw; Kerry Fox; Kit Connor; David Wilmot; Phénix Brossard; Sebastian Hülk; Lindsay Duncan
- Cinematography: Martin Gschlacht
- Edited by: Karina Ressler
- Production companies: Coop99; Essential Filmproduktion; The Bureau; Arte; BBC Films; British Film Institute
- Distributed by: X Verleih AG (Germany); Filmladen (Austria); BFI Distribution (United Kingdom)
- Release dates: 17 May 2019 (Cannes); 1 November 2019 (Austria); 9 January 2020 (Germany); 21 February 2020 (United Kingdom)
- Running time: 105 minutes
- Countries: Austria; Germany; United Kingdom
- Language: English
- Box office: $136,242

Little Joe is a 2019 drama film co-written and directed by Jessica Hausner. Starring Emily Beecham as Alice Woodard, a plant breeder and single mother who creates "Little Joe", a plant that gives its caretakers joy.

The film had its world premiere at the main competition of the 2019 Cannes Film Festival, where Beecham won the Best Actress award.

== Plot ==
Alice Woodard is a plant breeder who works in a lab that focuses on creating new strains of flowers. While her colleague Bella is failing at creating a hardy plant that will survive even weeks of undernourishment and neglect, Alice and her team have successfully created a flower that requires more care than an ordinary plant but which makes their owners happy.

Alice decides to name the plants "Little Joe" in honour of her son and smuggles out one of the plants for him.

The Little Joes begin to aggressively pollinate, which Alice theorizes is because she has made them sterile. The same day Bella's dog, Bello, goes missing. Work colleague Chris goes looking for him and accidentally inhales some of the pollen. Later on he takes Alice out and, despite her obvious reluctance, attempts to kiss her twice.

The following day, Bella finds Bello in the lab. He attacks her and she insists that he has changed. Chris later tells Alice that Bella is mentally ill and had previously attempted suicide before being forced on a year-long sabbatical, returning only shortly before Alice began working at the lab. Alice later learns that Bella had Bello put down. Bella tells Alice that the changes to Bello were due to the plant.

Alice's son is accidentally pollinated by the plant and begins to act strangely, sneaking his classmate Selma into the lab and stealing a Little Joe. He later tells Alice that he is considering moving in with his father, Ivan.

Bothered by her son's behaviour, Alice begins to examine test footage of subjects who have been exposed to the pollen. In every case their family members report that they are acting strangely and have seemed to change since the pollen test. However, just as Alice begins to believe Bella's suspicions, Bella is exposed to the pollen herself and dismisses her previous beliefs as paranoia due to her mental issues.

Joe reveals that he and Selma stole the plant in order to pollinate Ivan, confirming Alice's suspicions that her plant carries a virus, especially as she has used unorthodox methods to create Little Joe. However, this turns out to be a joke as Chris previously talked to Joe about Alice's concerns. At work Bella reveals that she never inhaled the pollen and was only pretending to be happy in order to blend in with the others. Immediately afterwards, Alice overhears Bella fall off of a staircase during a confrontation with Chris.

After Alice's boss dismisses her concerns, she takes matters into her own hands and decides to kill the Little Joes before they are commercialized, lowering the temperature in the lab. She is stopped by Chris, who, in trying to prevent her from harming the plants, knocks her out on the floor of the lab, exposing her to the plant pollen.

Later, Alice learns that Little Joe has been nominated for an award, meaning that the plant will be sold worldwide. When Chris apologizes for hitting her, she kisses him, and later dismisses her concerns as paranoia. She allows Joe to move in with his father and starts a new, happier life with her own Little Joe.

== Cast ==
- Emily Beecham as Alice Woodard
- Ben Whishaw as Chris
- Kerry Fox as Bella
- Kit Connor as Joe Woodard
- David Wilmot as Karl
- Phénix Brossard as Ric
- Sebastian Hülk as Ivan
- Lindsay Duncan as Psychotherapist
- Jessie Mae Alonzo as Selma
- Andrew Rajan as Jasper
- Janine Duvitski as Eleanore
- Goran Kostic as Mr Simic
- Leanne Best as Brittany

== Release ==
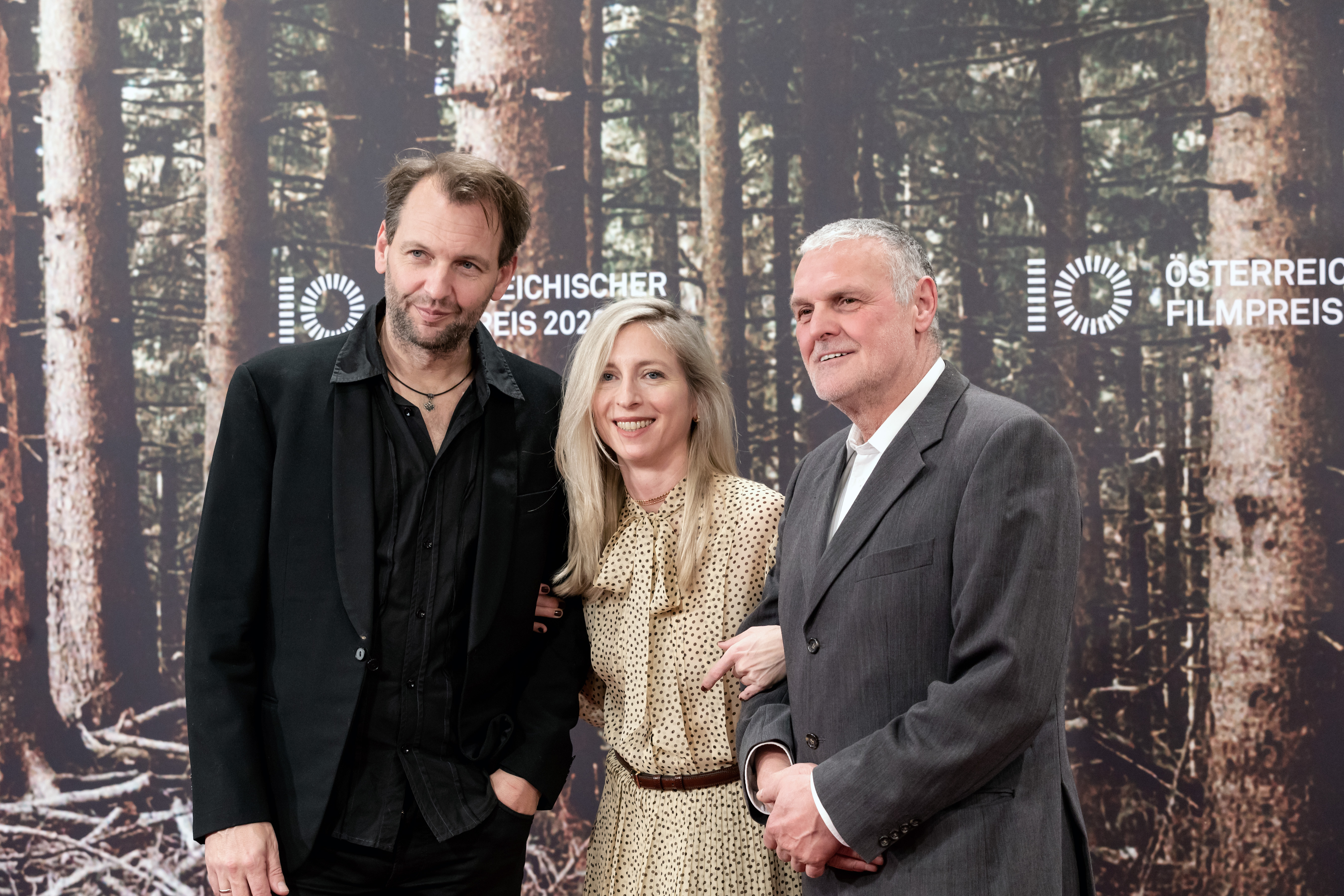
Martin Gschlacht, Jessica Hausner and Bruno Wagner (2020)

Little Joe had its world premiere at the Cannes Film Festival on 17 May 2019. Shortly after, Magnolia Pictures and BFI Distribution acquired the U.S. and U.K. distribution rights to the film. It was scheduled to be released in Austria on 1 November 2019, by Filmladen; in the United States on 6 December 2019; Germany on 9 January 2020, by X Verleih AG; and the United Kingdom on 21 February 2020.

== Reception ==
On the review aggregator website Rotten Tomatoes, 67% of 129 critics' reviews are positive. The website's consensus reads: "Little Joe's unorthodox approach may baffle horror fans lured in by its premise – but like its title character, the end result exerts a creepy thrall." Metacritic, which uses a weighted average, assigned the film a score of 60 out of 100, based on 25 critics, indicating "mixed or average" reviews.
