= Ol Parker =

British director, producer and screenwriter (born 1969)

- Born: Oliver Parker; 2 June 1969 (age 57); London, England
- Occupations: Director; producer; screenwriter
- Years active: 1995–present
- Spouse: Thandiwe Newton (m. 1998; sep. 2022)
- Children: 3, including Nico and Ripley

Oliver Parker (born 2 June 1969) is an English director, producer, and screenwriter. He wrote and directed the 2005 romantic-comedy Imagine Me & You and the 2018 musical film Mamma Mia! Here We Go Again.

== Early life ==
Parker was born in London, England, and brought up in the village of Radwinter, near the market town of Saffron Walden in Essex.

Parker was educated at Dame Bradbury's School, an independent school in Saffron Walden in Essex, Winchester College, and at Clare College, Cambridge, where he read English.

== Career ==
Parker's directing credits include Imagine Me & You (2005) and Now Is Good (2012). He wrote the screenplay for Imagine Me & You, The Best Exotic Marigold Hotel (2011) and The Second Best Exotic Marigold Hotel (2015), and wrote and directed the musical sequel, Mamma Mia! Here We Go Again (2018). He wrote and directed the 2022 romantic comedy Ticket to Paradise, starring George Clooney and Julia Roberts.

== Personal life ==
He married actress Thandiwe Newton in 1998, and they have three children, including daughters Ripley and Nico. He and Newton separated in 2022.

== Filmography ==
Year	Title	Director	Writer	Notes
2000	It Was an Accident	No	Yes	
2005	Imagine Me & You	Yes	Yes	
2011	The Best Exotic Marigold Hotel	No	Yes	
2012	Now Is Good	Yes	Yes	
2015	The Second Best Exotic Marigold Hotel	No	Yes	
2018	Mamma Mia! Here We Go Again	Yes	Yes	
2021	A Boy Called Christmas	No	Yes	Also executive producer
2022	Ticket to Paradise	Yes	Yes	
2026	Office Romance	Yes	No	
