= Greatest Days (film) =

2023 British film

- Film poster
- Directed by: Coky Giedroyc
- Written by: Tim Firth
- Produced by: Danny Perkins; Kate Solomon; Jane Hooks
- Cinematography: Mike Eley
- Edited by: Mark Davies
- Music by: Oli Julian; Nick Foster
- Production companies: Elysian Film Group; SPG3
- Distributed by: Elysian Film Group Distribution
- Release date: June 16, 2023
- Running time: 112 minutes
- Country: United Kingdom
- Language: English
- Box office: $2 million

Greatest Days is a 2023 British musical film based on the Take That jukebox musical of the same name (originally titled The Band), directed by Coky Giedroyc and written by Tim Firth.

The films tells the story of a group of five school friends seeing their favourite band (known as The Boys, but based on Take That) and them reuniting 25 years later to see the band again. The film was released on 16 June 2023. The film was then streamed on Amazon Prime Video from 25 August 2023.

== Plot ==
Rachel, a nurse living in London, wins a radio competition for tickets to a reunion concert in Athens by her childhood favourite boy band, The Boys. She initially plans to attend with her partner Jeff, who has proposed to her several times, but Rachel has repeatedly declined. They buy a caravan, which Rachel takes up North to get away, but Jeff tracks her down. Rachel tells him that she has decided to invite her childhood friends Heather, Zoe and Clare, whom she has not seen for 25 years, to accompany her.

Flashbacks reveal that Rachel, Heather, Zoe, Clare and Debbie were devoted fans of The Boys, a five-member boy band. During their school years, Rachel is affected by the breakdown of her parents' relationship, in which she comforts her brother Ryan. Her father stops her watching The Boys on Top of the Pops, and Rachel retreats into a fantasy world in which the band comforts her whilst singing Pray. Her four friends Heather, Zoe, Clare and Debbie support her as they spend time together around their northern hometown as the residents sing Could It Be Magic. Heather is preoccupied with her appearance, boys and makes clothes from items bought at jumble sales; Zoe is focused on her studies wanting to be a dean of a university college; Clare trains in pursuit of becoming an Olympic diver; and Debbie makes Heather promise to be Rachel's chief bridesmaid if Rachel ever marries.

The girls skip school to watch Clare compete in a diving competition. Although Clare is overwhelmed by the pressure, her friends encourage her to jump off the diving board as an instrumental version of Said It All plays. Debbie later obtains tickets for the five of them to see The Boys in Manchester where they sing a medley of songs including Promises and Babe. After the concert, the girls unsuccessfully attempt to meet the band and miss the last train home. A bus driver agrees to take them back, during which they imagine The Boys performing Relight My Fire. After being kicked off the bus for causing a disturbance, they spend the night on a moor overlooking their hometown. Debbie gives each of them a wristband and makes them promise to wear it for the rest of their lives.

In the present day, Rachel reunites with Heather, now an international fashion designer; Zoe, who appears to be a university professor; and Clare, who still lives with her mother in their hometown. The four women travel to Athens, where their journey is accompanied by a performance of Shine by airport staff and The Boys.

In Athens, the women tour the city on electric scooters whilst the residents of the city sing Greatest Day before dancing in a fountain. The fountain's marble statues are revealed to be imagined members of The Boys, and Clare reluctantly joins them in the fountain's water. Heather reveals that she has a daughter from a same-sex relationship and that her marriage has ended. The women are arrested for causing a disturbance in the fountain and whilst being held, discuss their lives since leaving school. Zoe has four sons, while Clare reveals that she abandoned her diving career after timing out during a national competition. As the imagined The Boys sing Said It All, she says that she did not enter water again until the fountain, attributing her withdrawal from the sport to the absence of her friends support. After that she turned to crisps, including Monster Munch. The women also acknowledge that they have continued to follow one another's lives through social media, family connections and the media. The women are released when the police chief reveals himself to be a fan of The Boys singing part of The Flood.

The women travel to the concert by train, continuing to sing The Flood. They briefly use a train, in which buskers (Gary Barlow, Howard Donald and Mark Owen) perform Shine. Heather reveals that her mother did not attend her wedding, implying it is because it was a same-sex marriage. Zoe reveals that, contrary to her friends' assumptions, her husband is the professor in their family and that she left university to raise their children. When they arrive at the venue, they discover that they have missed The Boys' performance. Zoe proposes a solution, but Heather accuses her of trying to mother the group. The argument escalates, causing the women to separate. It is revealed the friendship originally broken down because of Debbie, which Rachel blames on herself.

A further flashback reveals that, following the Manchester concert, Rachel asked Debbie to walk home with her. After dropping Rachel off, Debbie was struck and killed by a speeding driver. At Debbie's funeral, Rachel delivers a eulogy. Later, the four surviving friends return to the moor. They write messages to Debbie on balloons and prepare to release them, but an argument leads them to blame one another for her death. They pop the balloons and separate, with Rachel retreating into her fantasy of The Boys comforting her singing A Million Love Songs.

Back in Athens, each woman is visited by the younger version of herself singing Back For Good, prompting them to reconsider their estrangement. Rachel returns to the UK, where Jeff meets her at the airport and comforts her by reciting lyrics from The Boys. Rachel tells him that her childhood friends, including Debbie, remain an important part of her life. Heather, Zoe and Clare likewise return to their families and begin making changes in their lives. Zoe reenrols at university, while Clare begins coaching young divers. Heather takes her daughter Eliana to a jumble sale in their hometown, visiting a stall run by Heather's mother.

Rachel eventually accepts Jeff's proposal. Jeff arranges for Heather, Zoe and Clare to be her surprise bridesmaids. During the wedding ceremony, Rachel sings Patience, and he later takes Rachel and the bridesmaids to the moor. The women reveal that they have kept the wristbands Debbie gave them 25 years earlier. They write new messages to Debbie - as Debbie sings Rule The World - on balloons and release them together, finally reconciling with their past.

The group returns to their hometown, where Rachel, Heather, Zoe and Clare celebrate with their friends and family alongside The Boys, their younger selves, performing Never Forget as the community joins them.

== Cast ==
- Aisling Bea as Rachel
  - Lara McDonnell as young Rachel
- Alice Lowe as Heather
  - Eliza Dobson as young Heather
- Amaka Okafor as Zoe
  - Nandi Sawyers-Hudson as young Zoe
- Jayde Adams as Claire
  - Carragon Guest as young Claire
- Marc Wootton as Jeff
- Matthew McNulty as Stuart
- Jessie Mae Alonzo as Debbie
- Aaron Bryan, Dalvin Cory, Joshua Jung, Mark Samaras, Mervin Noronha as The Boys
- Emmet Byrne as Ryan
  - George Cobell as young Ryan
- Gary Barlow, Howard Donald & Mark Owen as Buskers on Train (cameo)

== Musical numbers ==
A soundtrack album was released on 16 June 2023 to coincide with the film's cinematic release. It featured the orchestrations by Oli Julian and Nick Foster.

=== Track listing ===
1. Opening - Oli Julian, Nick Foster, Morgan Wiltshire, Soul Sanctuary Gospel Choir
2. Pray - Aaron Bryan, Dalvin Cory, Joshua Jung, Mark Samaras, Mervin Noronha, Lara McDonnell, The Cast Of Greatest Days
3. Could It Be Magic - The Cast Of Greatest Days
4. Said It All (Orchestral Version) - Oli Julian, Nick Foster
5. Relight My Fire - Jessie Mae Alonzo, Tom Rasmussen, The Cast Of Greatest Days
6. The Concert - Aaron Bryan, Dalvin Cory, Joshua Jung, Mark Samaras, Mervin Noronha, The Cast Of Greatest Days
7. Nope - Oli Julian, Nick Foster
8. Present Day - Oli Julian, Nick Foster
9. Shine - Matthew McNulty, The Cast Of Greatest Days
10. Greatest Day - The Cast Of Greatest Days
11. Said It All - Aaron Bryan, Dalvin Cory, Joshua Jung, Mark Samaras, Mervin Noronha, The Cast Of Greatest Days
12. Shine (Buskers' Version) - Take That
13. The Flood - Aisling Bea, Jayde Adams, The Cast Of Greatest Days
14. Five Minute Detour - Oli Julian, Nick Foster
15. A Million Love Songs - Aaron Bryan, The Cast Of Greatest Days
16. Jeff Breaks It Down - Oli Julian, Nick Foster
17. She Asked Me To Walk Her Home - Oli Julian, Nick Foster
18. Back For Good - Aisling Bea, Alice Lowe, Jayde Adams, Amaka Okafor, Lara McDonnell, Carragon Guest, Nandi Hudson, Eliza Dobson, The Cast Of Greatest Days
19. Back To Reality - Oli Julian, Nick Foster
20. Patience - Aisling Bea, Marc Wootton, The Cast Of Greatest Days
21. Rule The World - Jessie Mae Alonzo
22. Never Forget - The Cast Of Greatest Days
23. Greatest Day (Robin Schulz Rework) - Take That, Robin Schulz, Calum Scott

== Production ==
=== Pre Production ===
Producing the film are Danny Perkins, Kate Solomon and Jane Hooks. Executive producers include Take That themselves, Damian Jones of DJ Films, Tobias Gutzwiller of SPG3, David Pugh and Dafydd Rogers who produced the original musical, and Joe Naftalin.

=== Casting ===
In March 2022, it was announced Aisling Bea would star in the film alongside Alice Lowe, Amaka Okafor, Jayde Adams, Marc Wootton, Matthew McNulty, Lara McDonnell, Jessie Mae Alonzo, Nandi Sawyers-Hudson, Carragon Guest, and Eliza Dobson. Aaron Bryan, Dalvin Cory, Joshua Jung, Mark Samaras and Mervin Noronha would make up the film's fictional boy band.

=== Filming ===
Principal photography took place in Clitheroe, Lancashire in April 2022 before moving to Athens.

== Distribution ==
=== Release ===
Greatest Days premiered in London on 15 June 2023. Take That performed in Leicester Square at the premiere. The film was released on 16 June 2023.

=== Home media ===
Following the cinematic release, the film was released on Amazon Prime Video on 25 August 2023. The film was released on DVD in the UK on 3 February 2025.

== Reception ==
On the review aggregator website Rotten Tomatoes, 77% of 22 critics' reviews are positive, with an average rating of 5.9/10. Metacritic, which uses a weighted average, assigned the film a score of 47 out of 100, based on eight critics, indicating "mixed or average" reviews.
