= Everything Now (TV series) =

British television series

- Genre: Comedy-drama
- Created by: Ripley Parker
- Starring: Sophie Wilde; Lauryn Ajufo; Harry Cadby; Noah Thomas; Sam Reuben; Niamh McCormack; Jessie Mae Alonzo; Robert Akodoto; Vivienne Acheampong; Alex Hassell; Stephen Fry
- Composers: Rupert Cross; Laura Mvula; Theo Vidgen
- Country of origin: United Kingdom
- Original language: English
- No. of series: 1
- No. of episodes: 8

Production
- Executive producers: Andy Harries; Sian McWilliams; Rob Bullock; Ripley Parker
- Producers: Andy Brunskill; Huberta von Liel; Florence Haddon-Cave
- Cinematography: Mark Nutkins; Alvin V Rush
- Editors: Al Morrow; Andrew Walton; Jack Goessens
- Running time: 44–50 minutes
- Production companies: Left Bank Pictures; Sony Pictures Television

Original release
- Network: Netflix
- Release: 5 October 2023

Everything Now is a British teen comedy-drama television series created by Ripley Parker. Produced by Left Bank Pictures and Sony Pictures Television, the series was released on Netflix on 5 October 2023.

== Synopsis ==
Mia (Wilde) is a 16-year-old girl from London who rejoins sixth form after a hospital stay due to anorexia nervosa.

== Cast ==
=== Main ===
- Sophie Wilde as Mia Polanco
- Lauryn Ajufo as Becca Lloyd
- Harry Cadby as Cameron "Cam"
- Noah Thomas as William "Will"
- Sam Reuben as Alex, Mia's brother
- Niamh McCormack as Alison Price
- Jessie Mae Alonzo as Carli
- Robert Akodoto as Theo Mason
- Vivienne Acheampong as Viv, Mia's mother
- Alex Hassell as Rick, Mia's father
- Stephen Fry as Dr. Nell

=== Recurring ===
- Kiran Krishnakumar as Jonah
- George Greenland as Nick
- Sani Thabo as Rhodri
- Amy Trigg as Miss Lambert

== Episodes ==
No.	Title	Directed by	Written by	Original release date
1	"Episode 1"	Alyssa McClelland	Ripley Parker	5 October 2023
After the completion of treatment Mia is ready to get back to her life to discover her friends have been drinking, partying and hooking up without her.
2	"Episode 2"	Alyssa McClelland	Ripley Parker	5 October 2023
Post-party gossip gives Mia flashbacks from the hospital. She gets an invite from her crush and karaoke with the crew and it's time for a bigger bucket list.
3	"Episode 3"	Charlie Manton	Ripley Parker	5 October 2023
Mia tries to reinvent herself through drama club. Cam and Becca struggle to communicate things at work.
4	"Episode 4"	Charlie Manton	Ripley Parker	5 October 2023
Daunted by crossing sex off her list, Mia opts for breaking the law instead; during a mansion rager, hard liquor and harder truths flow freely.
5	"Episode 5"	Dionne Edwards	Roanne Bardsley	5 October 2023
A shared suspicion brings Mia and Alison closer together and finds them on a spa day with Viv; as Becca confides in her mother, Will speaks his truth.
6	"Episode 6"	Dionne Edwards	Dylan Brady	5 October 2023
A frustrated Alex feels mounting pressure to be perfect; the Polancos meet for a family therapy session after a harrowing school day.
7	"Episode 7"	Laura Steinel	Glenn Waldron	5 October 2023
Mia's 17th birthday party ticks several boxes on the list, but there's no shortage of drama; Cam combats jealousy and indifference; Will runs his mouth.
8	"Episode 8"	Laura Steinel	Ripley Parker	5 October 2023
Viv makes a distressing discovery; devastating news about an old friend reignites Mia's rush to finish the list.

== Production ==
The project was green-lit by Netflix in November 2021 as an eight-part series called The Fuck-It Bucket. Executive producers are Andy Harries, Sian McWilliams and Rob Bullock for Left Bank Pictures, alongside screenplay writer Ripley Parker. In March 2023 The Hollywood Reporter revealed the title had been changed to Everything Now.

=== Casting ===
In August 2022 it was announced that Stephen Fry had joined the cast along with Vivienne Acheampong. Cast member Lauryn Ajufo described the project as having "A cast that you're bound to fall in love with", and that she was, as of December 2022, "patiently waiting for the release" as it was a project she felt "grateful to be a part of".

== Broadcast and reception ==
Everything Now was released on Netflix on 5 October 2023, with all 8 episodes.

The series has been compared to other Netflix series such as Heartstopper and Sex Education. On the website Rotten Tomatoes, the show has a rating of 78%, based on 9 reviews, with an average rating of 6.30/10.

In an interview with Film Updates, writer Dylan Brady confirmed that Netflix had cancelled the series after one season, despite at least one script for a second season having already been written.
