= Thandiwe Newton =

English actress (born 1972)

Thandiwe Newton OBE
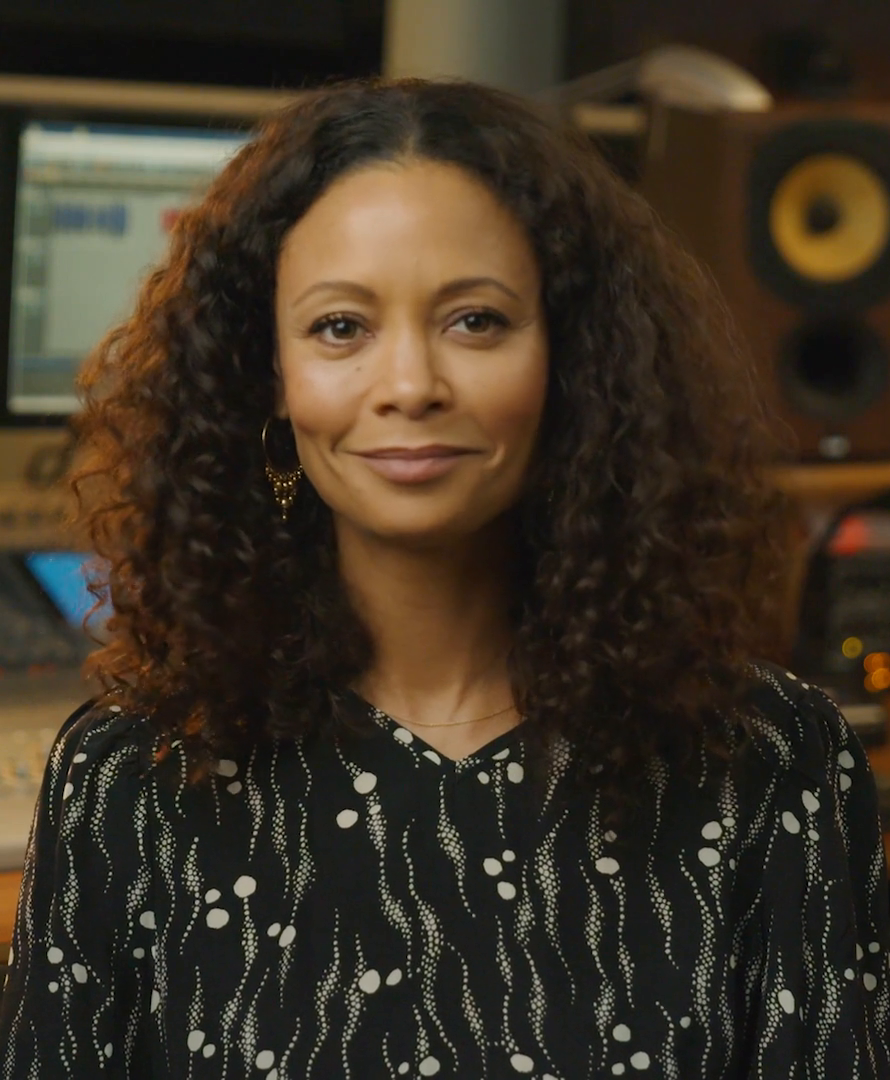
- Newton in 2021
- Born: Melanie Thandiwe Newton; 6 November 1972 (age 54); Westminster, London, England
- Other name: Thandie Newton
- Education: Downing College, Cambridge (BA)
- Occupation: Actress
- Years active: 1989–present
- Spouse: Ol Parker (m. 1998; sep. 2022)
- Children: 3, including Nico and Ripley

Melanie Thandiwe Newton (/ˈtændiːweɪ/ TAN-dee-way; born 6 November 1972), formerly credited as Thandie Newton (/ˈtændi/ TAN-dee), is a British actress. She has received various awards, including a Primetime Emmy and a BAFTA, as well as nominations for two Golden Globes. She was appointed Officer of the Order of the British Empire (OBE) in the 2019 New Year Honours for services to film and charity.

Newton made her film debut in Flirting (1991) and had a supporting role in Interview with the Vampire (1994), before achieving wider recognition with her portrayal of the title character in Beloved (1998). Subsequent credits include Mission: Impossible 2 (2000), The Chronicles of Riddick (2004), The Pursuit of Happyness (2006), Norbit, Run Fatboy Run (both 2007), RocknRolla, W. (both 2008), 2012 (2009), For Colored Girls (2010), and Solo: A Star Wars Story (2018). For her performance in Crash (2004), she won the BAFTA Award for Best Supporting Actress.

On television, Newton played Maeve Millay in Westworld (2016–2022), winning the Primetime Emmy Award for Outstanding Supporting Actress in 2018. Her other credits include ER (2003–2009), Rogue (2013–2015), The Slap (2015), and Line of Duty (2017). She also voiced Mona in the animated sitcom Big Mouth (2019–2025) and its spinoff, Human Resources (2021–2023).

== Early life and education ==
Melanie Thandiwe Newton was born in the Westminster area of London on 6 November 1972, the daughter of a Zimbabwean mother and an English father. Her mother was a member of a Shona chieftaincy family, and her father worked as a laboratory technician and artist. Her parents lived in Zambia, and she was born whilst they were in England to visit relatives; they then returned to Zambia, where her younger brother was later born. This has led her birthplace to be incorrectly reported as Zambia in some sources, but she has confirmed in interviews that she was born in Westminster. "Thandiwe" is a name of Nguni origin and means "beloved".

When Newton was three years old, she returned with her family to England, where they settled in Penzance so her father could help run his family's antique business. She attended St Mary's Roman Catholic Primary School. She later said of her upbringing, "From about the age of five, I was aware that I didn't fit. I was the black atheist kid in the all-white Catholic school run by nuns. I was an anomaly." She began dropping the letter "w" from her middle name, making it "Thandie" (pronounced /ˈtændi/ TAN-dee). She studied dance at the Tring Park School for the Performing Arts, then studied at Downing College, Cambridge, where she obtained a degree in social anthropology in 1995.

== Career ==
=== 1991–1999: Early roles and breakthrough ===
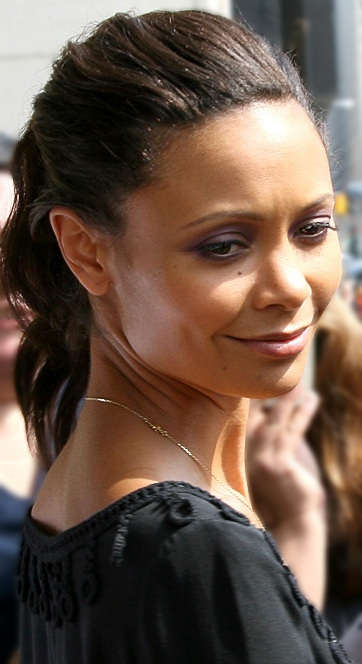
Newton in 2007

Newton made her film debut in the coming of age comedy-drama Flirting (1991), filmed in 1989 but shelved for two years. She was credited as "Thandie Newton", a screen name she would continue to use for the next 30 years. Ironically, the character she played in Flirting was named Thandiwe; writer-director John Duigan renamed the character to Thandiwe after casting Newton, as he felt her name was more authentic than the one he had originally thought up.

Her first American film was the 1994 Brad Pitt and Tom Cruise film Interview with the Vampire, in which she portrayed the slave Yvette. Newton appeared in the Merchant Ivory production of Jefferson in Paris as Sally Hemings. She then played Cookie in the 1996 film Gridlock'd alongside Tupac Shakur and Tim Roth. Next, she played in Jonathan Demme's drama Beloved (1998), based on Toni Morrison's novel, in which she played the title character, the ghost of a young slave girl whose mother kills her to save her from slavery. The film also starred Oprah Winfrey and Danny Glover. Newton starred as Nyah Nordoff-Hall, again opposite Cruise, in Mission: Impossible 2. Her next role was in the low-budget film It Was an Accident, written by her husband, screenwriter Ol Parker.

=== 2000–2015: Crash and other roles ===
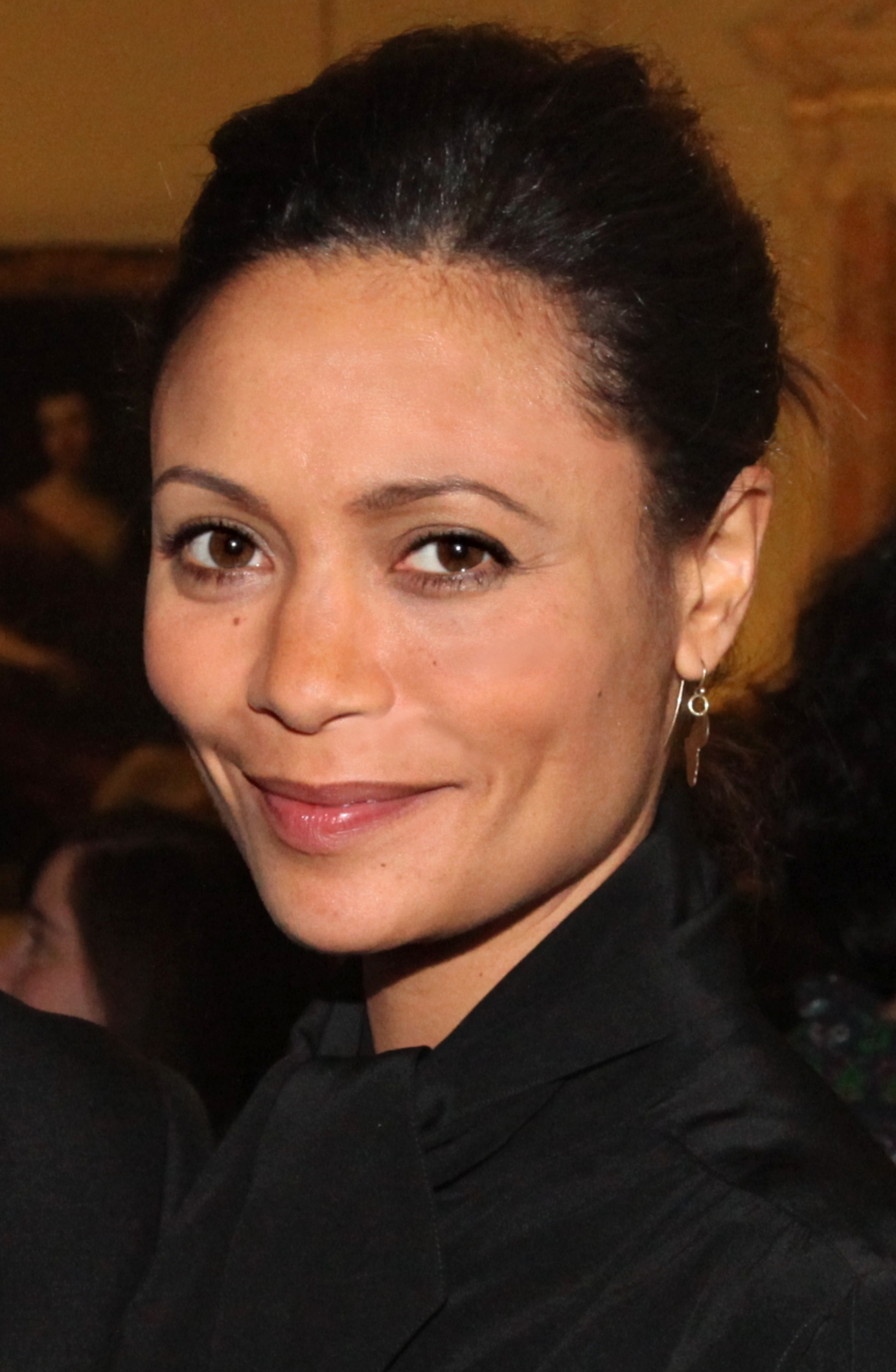
Newton in 2010

Between 2003 and 2005, Newton played Makemba "Kem" Likasu, love interest of John Carter on the American television series ER. She reprised the role for the series finale in 2009. She took a supporting role as Dame Vaako in The Chronicles of Riddick (2004). She acted in the ensemble drama Crash acting opposite Terrence Howard, playing a woman who was groped by a police officer played by Matt Dillon. Her performance earned widespread acclaim earning her the BAFTA Award for Best Actress in a Supporting Role as well as a nomination with the cast for a Screen Actors Guild Award. She played Chris Gardner's wife, Linda Gardner, in The Pursuit of Happyness opposite Will Smith. Also in 2006, Newton performed on radio in a pantomime version of Cinderella.

In 2007, Newton co-starred with Eddie Murphy as his love interest in the comedy Norbit. She played opposite Simon Pegg as his ex-girlfriend in the 2007 comedy Run Fatboy Run. She next portrayed Condoleezza Rice, US National Security Advisor and then Secretary of State in W., Oliver Stone's biography of President George W. Bush. The film was released in October 2008. Newton was an introducer at Wembley Stadium on 7 July 2007, for the UK leg of Live Earth. She was due to introduce former US Vice President Al Gore to the concert, but he was delayed, leaving Newton to tell jokes in an attempt to entertain the audience. Newton next portrayed fictional US First Daughter Laura Wilson in 2012, a disaster film directed by Roland Emmerich and released 13 November 2009. In July 2011, Newton delivered a TED talk on "Embracing otherness, embracing myself." She discussed finding her "otherness" as a child growing up in two distinct cultures, and as an actress playing many different selves. She acted in Tyler Perry's movie For Colored Girls (2010), adapted from Ntozake Shange's 1975 original choreopoem for colored girls who have considered suicide / when the rainbow is enuf.

In 2012, she starred opposite Tyler Perry in his romantic drama film Good Deeds, the film was a moderate financial success but received negative reviews. That same year she made her West End debut playing Paulina Salas in the revival of the Ariel Dorfman play Death and the Maiden at the Harold Pinter Theatre. Kate Kellaway of The Guardian wrote of her performance, "She has been completely miscast. She looks and sounds too immaculate. And the trouble is that, with a less than brilliant lead, the play's contrivance starts to show through." In 2013, Newton starred in Rogue, the first original drama series for DirecTV's Audience Network. She left Rogue during the third season. In 2015, she starred in the US miniseries The Slap.

=== 2016–present: Westworld and acclaim ===
From 2016 to 2022, Newton portrayed Maeve Millay in HBO science fiction drama series Westworld, for which she garnered universal acclaim. She received several accolades, including a Primetime Emmy Award for Outstanding Supporting Actress in a Drama Series (out of three nominations), two Critics’ Choice Awards, and nominations for a Golden Globe and Screen Actors Guild Award. James White for Empire lauded Newton's performance, saying: "Thandie Newton is killing these emotional moments, giving Maeve a twitchy, panicked air without ever overplaying it and really helping us to feel for her." William Goodman for Complex wrote: "Westworld becomes the Thandie Newton show, which benefits everyone involved; she’s consistently electric, and the series gives her no shortage of fun things to do."

In 2017, she served as a narrator for the documentary entitled Bill Cosby: Fall of an American Icon, an exposé on the sexual assault charges laid against Cosby, which aired on BBC One. In the same year, Newton played DCI Roseanne "Roz" Huntley in the fourth season of BBC One's Line of Duty, a role for which she received a BAFTA TV Award nomination for Best Actress.

Newton appeared as Val in the Star Wars film Solo: A Star Wars Story, which was released in May 2018 to generally favorable reviews but bombed at the box office with a worldwide gross of $393.2 million. Newton became the first black woman to have a major non-alien role in a Star Wars film; however, she expressed disappointment in the role as the fate of the character was changed during filming and found it to be a mistake for the franchise in the sense of what it meant for black women in the franchise. Additionally, Scott Mendelson for Forbes felt that Newton was "underutilized" and David Edelstein for Vulture wrote in praise of her performance: "The only thing wrong with Thandie Newton’s performance is that there’s not enough of it."

In a 2021 interview, Newton announced that she would be changing her screen name to "Thandiwe Newton", and would be credited as such beginning with Reminiscence (2021). Of the change, she said, "That's my name. It's always been my name. I'm taking back what's mine." She also said that she would attempt to have corrections applied to her past performance credits. In 2022, Newton played the lead role of Sandra Guidry in the thriller God’s Country which premiered at the Sundance Film Festival. For her performance in the film, she received a nomination for Outstanding Lead Performance at the Gotham Awards.

== Personal life ==
Newton is a vegan. She has expressed an affinity for Buddhism.

Newton has been close friends with Nicole Kidman since 1989.

David Schwimmer, who directed Run Fatboy Run, called her "the queen of practical jokes" for her behaviour on film sets.

Newton was named PETA's "Sexiest Vegan of 2014" in the UK.

Newton was ranked one of the best-dressed women in 2018 by fashion website Net-a-Porter. Later that year, she was named as one of the 100 most influential black British people in the Powerlist.

=== Marriage and relationships ===
Newton married English filmmaker Ol Parker in 1998. They have two daughters, Ripley and Nico, and a son born in 2014. All three were home births. Nico is also an actor and Ripley is a writer. She and Parker separated in 2022. Newton is currently in a relationship with American musician Elijah Dias.

=== Allegations of Abuse ===
In 2011, Newton first alleged that director John Duigan pursued an ongoing coercive sexual dynamic with her that started on her first film, Flirting, when she was only 16 years old and continued for four years. She has repeatedly stated in the press that this was not a "relationship" and yet it continues to get cited as such in wikipedia and elsewhere.

=== Activism and politics ===
In 2006, Newton contributed a foreword to We Wish: Hopes and Dreams of Cornwall's Children, a book of children's writing published in aid of the NSPCC. In it, she wrote about her childhood memories of growing up in Cornwall, and the way in which its cultural heritage made it easy for her to "enrich every situation with layers of magic and meaning".

In 2007, after Greenpeace members put a sticker that said "this gas-guzzling 4x4 is causing climate change" on the BMW X5 she had recently purchased, she sold the car and bought a Toyota Prius.

In 2008, Newton visited the poverty-stricken village of Nampasso in Mali, describing it as a "humbling experience".

In 2013, Newton led the One Billion Rising flash mob in London, intended to fight for justice, gender equality, and an end to violence.

In 2016, Newton stated she had been the victim of a director who repeatedly showed his friends a video of her in a sexually graphic audition she had made as a teenager. She cited this experience as part of why she had taken the Westworld role, which involved substantial nudity and reflected experiences of survivors of sexual abuse while also asking moral questions about what it means to be human. In 2018, she said she was disappointed not to have been invited to participate in Time's Up, a movement against sexual harassment, considering that she had been "ostracised" for having spoken out about alleged sexual abuse by a director.

In 2020, Newton was one of a number of celebrities and MPs who signed a letter opposing the deportation of 50 convicted offenders from the UK to Jamaica.

== Acting credits ==
=== Film ===
| Year | Title | Role | Notes |
|---|---|---|---|
| 1991 | Flirting | Thandiwe Adjewa | |
| 1993 | The Young Americans | Rachael Stevens | |
| 1994 | Loaded | Zita | |
| 1994 | Interview with the Vampire | Yvette | |
| 1995 | Jefferson in Paris | Sally Hemings | |
| 1995 | The Journey of August King | Annalees Williamsburg | |
| 1996 | The Leading Man | Hilary Rule | |
| 1997 | Gridlock'd | Barbara "Cookie" Cook | |
| 1998 | Besieged | Shandurai | |
| 1998 | Beloved | Beloved | |
| 2000 | Mission: Impossible 2 | Nyah Nordoff-Hall | |
| 2000 | It Was an Accident | Noreen Hurlock | |
| 2002 | The Truth About Charlie | Regina Lambert | |
| 2003 | Shade | Tiffany | |
| 2004 | The Chronicles of Riddick | Dame Vaako | |
| 2004 | Crash | Christine Thayer | |
| 2006 | The Pursuit of Happyness | Linda Gardner | |
| 2007 | Norbit | Kate Thomas | |
| 2007 | Run Fatboy Run | Libby Odell | |
| 2008 | RocknRolla | Stella | |
| 2008 | How to Lose Friends & Alienate People | Herself | |
| 2008 | W. | Condoleezza Rice | |
| 2009 | 2012 | Laura Wilson | |
| 2010 | Huge | Kris | |
| 2010 | Vanishing on 7th Street | Rosemary | |
| 2010 | For Colored Girls | Tangie Adrose | |
| 2011 | Retreat | Kate Kennedy | |
| 2011 | The Prophet | Narrator (voice) | |
| 2012 | Good Deeds | Lindsey Wakefield | |
| 2013 | Half of a Yellow Sun | Olanna | |
| 2018 | Gringo | Bonnie Soyinka | |
| 2018 | Solo: A Star Wars Story | Val Beckett | |
| 2018 | The Death & Life of John F. Donovan | Audrey Newhouse | |
| 2021 | Reminiscence | Emily "Watts" Sanders | |
| 2022 | God's Country | Sandra Guidry | |
| 2022 | All the Old Knives | Celia Harrison | |
| 2023 | Chicken Run: Dawn of the Nugget | Ginger (voice) | |
| 2024 | Mufasa: The Lion King | Eshe (voice) | |
| 2025 | Anaconda | Claire Simons | |
| TBA | Cry to Heaven † | Marianna Treschi | Post-production |

=== Television ===
| Year | Title | Role | Notes |
|---|---|---|---|
| 1991 | Pirate Prince | Becky Newton | Television film |
| 1997 | In Your Dreams | Clare | Television film |
| 2003–2009 | ER | Makemba "Kem" Likasu | 14 episodes |
| 2006 | American Dad! | Makeva (voice) | Episode: "Camp Refoogee" |
| 2013–2015 | Rogue | Grace Travis | Main role; 24 episodes |
| 2015 | The Slap | Aisha | Main role; 8 episodes |
| 2016–2022 | Westworld | Maeve Millay | Main role; 36 episodes |
| 2017 | Line of Duty | DCI Roseanne "Roz" Huntley | Main role; 6 episodes |
| 2018 | The Big Narstie Show | Herself | Episode: "1.2" |
| 2019–2025 | Big Mouth | Mona the Hormone Monstress (voice) | 36 episodes |
| 2020 | RuPaul's Drag Race | Herself | 2 episodes |
| 2022–2023 | Human Resources | Mona the Hormone Monstress (voice) | 9 episodes |
| 2025 | Wednesday | Dr. Fairburn | 3 episodes |
| 2026 | RuPaul's Drag Race UK | Herself | Episode: "The Werkin' Queens Club" |
| TBA | First Day on Earth † | Ernest | Filming |

=== Theatre ===
| Year | Title | Role | Venue | Ref. |
|---|---|---|---|---|
| 2011–2012 | Death and the Maiden | Paulina Salas | Harold Pinter Theatre, West End | |

=== Music video ===
| Year | Song | Artist | Ref. |
|---|---|---|---|
| 2017 | "Family Feud" | Jay-Z feat. Beyoncé | |
