= Niamh McCormack =

Irish actress (born 2001)

- Born: Niamh Rose McCormack; 17 January 2001 (age 25); Ballsbridge, Dublin, Ireland
- Occupations: Actress; Model
- Years active: 2010–present
- Height: 173 cm (5 ft 8 in)

Niamh Rose McCormack (born 17 January 2001) is an Irish actress and model. On television, she is known for her roles in the Netflix series Everything Now (2023) and House of Guinness (2025–). Her films include The Magic Flute (2022).

== Early life and education ==
Born in Ballsbridge, South Dublin, McCormack is the daughter of makeup artist Annie Gribbin and publican Paddy McCormack. Her parents separated when she was an infant, and she was predominantly raised by her mother while visiting her father on weekends. McCormack left school at 14 to be homeschooled due to bullying and completed her Leaving Cert at a private college. She trained in acting at Bow Street Academy, graduating in 2019.

== Career ==
Signed with Morgan the Agency, McCormack began her modeling career when she was 14, with gigs for The Bridge, Arnotts and Life Style Sports. She participated in Milan Fashion Week at 16.

In December 2020, it was reported that McCormack would appear in the second season of Netflix adaptation of Andrzej Sapkowski's The Witcher as the mysterious W. She reprised her role as Róisín from the 2016 short film Lily in its 2021 feature version Who We Love, marking McCormack's feature film debut. In 2022, she played Sophie in the film The Magic Flute and made a guest appearance in the Disney+ series Willow. The following year, McCormack had a main role as Alison the Netflix teen drama Everything Now.

== Filmography ==
=== Film ===
Year	Title	Role	Notes
2021	Who We Love	Róisin	
2022	The Magic Flute	Sophie	
2023	Dungeons & Dragons: Honor Among Thieves	Rogue Contestant	
TBA	Feed	TBA	

=== Television ===
Year	Title	Role	Notes
2010	An Crisis	Aoibhinn Fitzgerald	Episode #1.3
2021	The Witcher	Lara Dorren	Episode: "Turn Your Back"
2022	Willow	Niamh	Episode: "The Gales"
2022	Witness Number 3	WPC Reed	Episode #1.4
2023	Everything Now	Alison	Main role
2025	Small Town, Big Story	Teen Wendy	6 episodes
2025	House of Guinness	Ellen Cochrane	Main role
TBA	Cold Mind	TBA	In production

=== Music videos ===
- "Everything You Love" (2020), Ring Saigo
