= In Flight (TV series) =

British television series

- Screenplay by: Mike Walden; Adam Randall
- Directed by: Chris Baugh
- Starring: Katherine Kelly
- Country of origin: United Kingdom
- Original language: English
- No. of series: 1
- No. of episodes: 6

Production
- Executive producers: Anna Burns; Tony Wood; Richard Tulk-Hart; Rebecca Dundon; Simon Judd; Chris Baugh; Mike Walden; Adam Randall
- Producer: Brendan Mullin
- Production companies: Fremantle; Buccaneer Media

Original release
- Network: Channel 4
- Release: 12 August – 21 August 2025

In Flight is a British television crime thriller drama series, airing on Channel 4 from 12 to 21 August 2025 and starring Katherine Kelly.

== Premise ==
The son of a flight attendant is arrested and she is blackmailed into drug smuggling.

== Cast ==
- Katherine Kelly as Jo Conran
- Stuart Martin as Cormac Kelleher
- Ashley Thomas as Dominic Delaney
- Bronagh Waugh as Melanie Delaney
- Harry Cadby as Sonny Conran
- Corinna Brown as Kayla Brown
- Julia Brown as Amy McCallum
- Ambreen Razia as Zara Gregston
- Charis Agbonlahor as D.I. Shana Wright
- Shaheen Jafargholi as Jordan Black

== Production ==
Katherine Kelly leads the cast. The cast also includes Stuart Martin, Ashley Thomas, Bronagh Waugh, Harry Cadby, Corinna Brown and Ambreen Razia.

Filming took place in Belfast in November 2024. First look images from filming were released the following year. Exterior shots and pub scenes were filmed at Clenaghan's just outside of Moira, County Down.

== Broadcast ==
The series broadcast on Channel 4 from 12 August 2025.

== Reception ==
As of February 2026, the series has a rating of 100% on review aggregator Rotten Tomatoes, based on 9 reviews.

Lucy Mangan, writing in The Guardian, gave the series 3 out of 5 stars, writing, "I don’t know if this counts as a successful thriller or not ...But for those who love the [drug-smuggling thriller format]...In Flight will be a classic of the genre... It’s brisk, it’s well made, it’s entirely harrowing".
