= Newark, Newark =

British television series

- Genre: Sitcom
- Created by: Nathan Foad
- Written by: Nathan Foad
- Directed by: Amanda Blue
- Starring: Morgana Robinson; Mathew Horne; Beverley Callard
- Country of origin: United Kingdom
- Original language: English
- No. of seasons: 1
- No. of episodes: 3

Production
- Executive producers: Dave Evans; Bryan Elsley; Nathan Foad
- Producer: Kenny Tanner
- Production company: Balloon Entertainment

Original release
- Network: Gold; BBC Two
- Release: 28 March – 30 March 2022

Newark, Newark is a British television sitcom set in the Nottinghamshire town of Newark-on-Trent, England. The series premiered on Gold on 28 March 2022, and revolves around the life of a recently divorced woman, her son, and her ex-husband. It later aired on BBC Two from 2 March 2024.

== Synopsis ==
Recently divorced Maxine (Morgana Robinson) is trying to adapt to single life, after separating from Terry (Mathew Horne). Meanwhile, their 16-year-old son Leslie, is dealing with the confusion of coming out, while his grandmother (Beverley Callard), sticks her nose into every situation.

== Cast and characters ==
- Morgana Robinson as Maxine
- Mathew Horne as Terry
- Beverley Callard as Pauline
- Jai Hollis as Leslie
- Jessie Mae Alonzo as Amber
- Vahid Gold as Rudy
- Saskia Chana as Claire
- Bo Poraj as Dariusz
- Oliver Woollford as Connor
- Nathan Foad as Rowan

== Production ==
The show was written by Nathan Foad, himself from the Nottinghamshire town of Newark-on-Trent, the setting for the sitcom, and where it was filmed. The series was directed by Amanda Blue, produced by Kenny Tanner and the production company was Balloon Entertainment.
