= Kim Adis =

British-Filipino actress (born 1993)

- Born: 10 January 1993 (age 33); Cebu City, Philippines
- Education: University of Westminster
- Years active: 2016–present

Kim Adis (born 10 January 1993) is a British-Filipino actress. She is best known for her role as Kitty Wei in the BBC iPlayer series Get Even (2020).

== Early life ==
Adis was born in Cebu City in the Philippines and moved to northern England with her mother, a nurse, at the age of eight where they settled in Burnley. She studied and graduated in journalism at the University of Westminster in 2014.

== Career ==
In 2018-2019, Adis had a recurring role as Anda in the Syfy series Krypton. She made her feature film debut in 2019 with a small role in Daniel Alfredson's Intrigo: Dear Agnes. In 2020, Adis starred in the lead role of Kitty Wei in the BBC iPlayer teen thriller series Get Even, which had an international release on Netflix. She also played Rose in the horror film The Turning and Clare Mahek in the interactive live action video game The Complex.

In 2021, Adis appeared in the Apple TV+ series Foundation as Lowre. This was followed in 2022 by roles as Katja Nilssen in the second season of Young Wallander, and as Ket in the prequel The Witcher: Blood Origin, both on Netflix.

== Filmography ==
=== Film ===
Year	Title	Role	Notes
2016	The Party Game	Clare	Short film
2019	After-Party	Kim	Short film
2019	Intrigo: Dear Agnes	Student	
2020	The Turning	Rose	
2023	Orchard	Wyn	Short film
2024	Shadow Land	Jamie	

=== Television ===
Year	Title	Role	Notes
2018	The Cry	Hostess	1 episode
2018–2019	Krypton	Anda	3 episodes
2020	Get Even	Kitty Wei	Main role
2021	Foundation	Lowre	2 episodes
2022	Young Wallander	Katja Nilssen	4 episodes
2022	The Witcher: Blood Origin	Ket	Episode: "Of Ballads, Brawlers, and Bloodied Blades"
2025	Wolf King	Erin	Voice

=== Voice work ===
- Video game The Complex (2020), Clare Mahek
- Podcast series Watch Dogs: Truth (2024), Jess
