= Vivienne Acheampong =

British actress and comedian (born 1983)

- Born: 1983 (age 42–43); Lewisham, London, England
- Occupation: Actress
- Years active: 2013–present

Vivienne Acheampong (born 1983) is a British comedian and actress, best known for playing Lucienne in the Netflix series The Sandman (2022–2025), and her appearances in Famalam.

== Career ==
Acheampong was a semi-finalist in the Funny Women Awards in 2013. Acheampong took her one woman comedy show to the Camden Fringe and the RADAR Festival, as well as the Edinburgh Fringe Festival.

Acheampong appeared from 2018 in three series of the BBC Comedy sketch series Famalam. Also in 2018, Acheampong provided a voice role for World of Warcraft: Battle for Azeroth. In 2020, she could be seen in the film adaptation of the Roald Dahl novel The Witches directed by Robert Zemeckis and starring Anne Hathaway. She also appeared in the UK television series The One, and a couple more UK sketch comedy series The Emily Atack Show with Emily Atack, and Ellie & Natasia with the actress and comedians Ellie White and Natasia Demetriou.

For her role in the television production of The Sandman she received the advice from Neil Gaiman, author of The Sandman graphic novel, that although the character Lucienne was a male character in the original text, she should trust that she had been chosen to play the role for a reason. Acheampong was unfamiliar with the story or the original comic book series prior to being cast in the role. Acheampong and The Sandman co-star Tom Sturridge guested on Empire magazine's The Pilot TV Podcast to discuss the production.

== Personal life ==
Vivienne attended East 15 Acting School and the BRIT School. She has Ghanaian heritage and lives in London.

== Filmography ==
Year	Title	Role	Notes
2018–20	Famalam		Sketch comedy series
2020	Death in Paradise	Sandrine Lamore	1 episode
2020	The Other One	Saff	1 episode
2020	The Witches	Alice’s mum	Feature film
2020	The Emily Atack Show		Sketch comedy series
2021	The One	Grace	Television series
2021	Ellie and Natasia		Sketch comedy series
2022–2025	The Sandman	Lucienne	Main role
2023	Everything Now	Viv Polanco	Series
2023	Jackdaw	Eddy	Feature film
