= Imagine Me & You =

2005 film directed by Ol Parker

- UK theatrical release poster
- Directed by: Ol Parker
- Written by: Ol Parker
- Produced by: Sophie Balhetchet; Barnaby Thompson; Andro Steinborn
- Starring: Piper Perabo; Lena Headey; Matthew Goode; Celia Imrie; Anthony Head; Darren Boyd; Eva Birthistle
- Cinematography: Ben Davis
- Edited by: Alex Mackie
- Music by: Alex Heffes
- Production companies: Focus Features; Ealing Studios; BBC Films; Minotaur Film Partnership No. 3; RTL Television; Filmstiftung NRW; Cougar Films; Fragile Films; X-Filme Creative Pool
- Distributed by: Universal Pictures (United Kingdom and Ireland; through United International Pictures); X Verleih AG (through Warner Bros. Pictures, Germany)
- Release dates: 9 September 2005 (TIFF); 25 May 2006 (Germany); 16 June 2006 (United Kingdom)
- Running time: 94 minutes
- Countries: Germany; United Kingdom
- Language: English
- Box office: $3.1 million

Imagine Me & You is a 2005 romantic comedy-drama film written and directed by Ol Parker and starring Piper Perabo and Lena Headey with Matthew Goode, Celia Imrie, and Anthony Head. It centers on the relationship between Rachel (Perabo) and Luce (Headey), who meet on Rachel's wedding day.

The film takes its title from the song "Happy Together", by The Turtles. Writer and director Parker reveals on the DVD audio commentary that the film was originally titled Click, after the French term for love at first sight, but conflicts with the 2006 Adam Sandler film Click necessitated the name change.

== Plot ==
The film opens on Hector "Heck" (Matthew Goode) and Rachel's (Piper Perabo) wedding day in North London, England which Rachel's overbearing mother, Tess, (Celia Imrie), is in charge of planning. Rachel's father Ned (Anthony Head) and her younger sister Henrietta, nicknamed "H" (Boo Jackson), are supportive. Flower shop owner Luce (Lena Headey) and Henrietta are chatting with Hector and Cooper "Coop" (Darren Boyd). Henrietta takes an immediate liking to her, and she asks if Luce can sit by her during the wedding. Rachel arrives with her father and the ceremony begins. During the ceremony, as Rachel walks down the aisle, she makes eye contact with Luce and does a double-take. At the reception afterwards, Luce introduces herself to Rachel. As Luce tries to get a drink, Rachel admits that her wedding ring fell in the punch, and the two fish it out before going their own ways.

Sometime later, Rachel goes to Luce's shop and invites her and Hector to dinner, with Rachel planning to set Luce up with Coop. Luce confides to Heck that she's a lesbian and is bemused as Coop attempts to seduce her. During the meal, Luce espouses her belief in love at first sight, while Rachel counters that it takes time to find the right person. Later on that night, Rachel and Luce share a moment together on the balcony as it rains. Coop drives Luce home, but senses something is bothering her. Stopping for coffee, he gets her to admit that she has feelings for someone who's unavailable but insists she would never get in between another couple.

The next day while grocery shopping, Hector and Rachel run into Luce and a female friend, Edie (Eva Birthistle). Hector then tells Rachel that Luce is gay. Hector inquires as to the relationship of Luce and Edie, but they assure Rachel and him that nothing is going on. Edie says Luce "loves another."

Hector sets Luce and Rachel up to spend some time together as friends despite Rachel attempting to avoid Luce. The two spend an evening together, visiting a football match and an arcade. At the end of the night, Luce walks Rachel back to her flat. Rachel leans forward to kiss Luce but withdraws at the last moment and goes inside her home.

Rachel continues to resist her growing attraction to Luce. Unable to deny what she is feeling, Rachel eventually confronts Luce directly at her flower shop. The two discuss the state of their relationship in a back room, concealed from any potential customers. She tells Luce that a romance between them cannot happen, turns to leave, and returns seconds later to kiss Luce. Their foreplay gets interrupted by Hector, who has stopped by to pick up flowers for Rachel, feeling guilty about the distance growing between them. Later, Rachel and Luce agree that they cannot betray Hector. Hector quits his job and when he returns home drunk, she confesses all to him as he sleeps, but does not say who her love is. Hector, who was feigning sleep, calls Coop for support. Coop confronts Luce after deducing that she is the one Rachel loves. Luce decides that being near Rachel without being with her is too hard. She makes plans to go on an extended trip out of the country, leaving care of her shop to her mother.

Days later, while Rachel and Hector are celebrating her birthday, Rachel finds out about Luce's trip, and Hector realizes who Rachel is in love with. Wanting Rachel to be happy, he leaves. Rachel confesses to her parents that she is in love with a woman, and she tracks down Luce. Rachel gets stuck in traffic and tries to call Luce, who ignores her. However, Rachel realizes Luce is in the same traffic jam when she hears the same man on a bicycle singing "Happy Together" and comments, "I've heard that song before." Rachel proceeds to climb on the roof of her car. She then uses the lessons Luce taught her at the football match about how to yell loudly to call to her. The two women reunite and kiss each other in the middle of a crowded London street.

During the end credits, we see the characters sometime later. Heck is on a plane, all set to write his travel book, when he discovers a young woman with whom he has instant chemistry (Angel Coulby) will be sitting next to him for the long flight. The scenes continue with H and her young boyfriend playing at a playground, Coop holding a baby, and Luce and Rachel enjoying each other's company.

== Cast ==
- Piper Perabo as Rachel
- Lena Headey as Luce
- Matthew Goode as Hector "Heck"
- Celia Imrie as Tessa
- Anthony Head as Ned
- Darren Boyd as Cooper "Coop"
- Sue Johnston as Ella
- Boo Jackson as Henrietta "H"
- Sharon Horgan as Beth
- Eva Birthistle as Edie
- Vinette Robinson as Zina
- Ben Miles as Rob
- Mona Hammond as Mrs. Edwards
- Rick Warden as Gordon
- Angel Coulby as Anna

== Reception ==
=== Box office ===
On 27 January 2006 the film opened in 106 theaters in the United States. In its opening weekend, the film made US$51,907. It stayed eight weeks on theaters in the US and made US$672,243 in total. In the Netherlands, the film grossed over €97,470, debuting at #10 in its second week. Worldwide the film grossed over US$2,635,305.

=== Critical response ===
On Rotten Tomatoes, Imagine Me & You holds an approval rating of 35%, based on 98 reviews, with an average rating of 5/10. The site's critics consensus reads: "Aside from its lesbian theme, Imagine Me & You can only offer more of the same generic rom-com cliches." On Metacritic, the film has a weighted average score of 49 out of 100, based on reviews from 25 critics, indicating "mixed or average reviews". Common Sense Media stated: "Thank heaven for British romcoms; less crude than their American counterparts and more witty and charming, they show the joy in falling in love, and this one's a worthy addition to the pantheon. What's refreshing about this movie is that every character is interesting and lovable – even the womanizing Cooper (Daren Boyd)." BBC wrote, "Love at first sight is the subject of debut director Ol Parker's Imagine Me & You, a witty and immensely enjoyable British romantic comedy."

The critical response from gay-friendly sites, however, has been extremely positive: Autostraddle ranked the film at 15 on its list of the 100 best lesbian films of all time. Luce and Rachel were both included on AfterEllen.com's "Top 50 Lesbian and Bisexual Characters" list.
