= Rebel Cheer Squad =

British television series

- Genre: Teen drama; Thriller
- Created by: Holly Phillips
- Based on: Don't Get Mad by Gretchen McNeil
- Starring: Renee Bailey; Amelia Brooks; Lashay Anderson; Ashling O'Shea; Elliott Wooster
- Composers: Esther Joy Lane; Amy McKnight
- Country of origin: United Kingdom
- Original language: English
- No. of series: 1
- No. of episodes: 8

Production
- Executive producers: Alison Davis; Chapman Maddox; Bob Higgins
- Producer: Dominic MacDonald
- Production location: Bolton, Greater Manchester
- Editor: Emma Collins
- Running time: 24–28 minutes
- Production companies: BBC; Netflix; Boat Rocker Studios

Original release
- Network: BBC iPlayer, CBBC
- Release: 14 February 2022

Rebel Cheer Squad is a British teen thriller series that premiered on BBC iPlayer and now on CBBC on 14 February 2022. The series acts as a spin-off series to Get Even (2020), both of which were adapted by Holly Phillips from the book series Don't Get Mad by Gretchen McNeil. Rebel Cheer Squad, like its predecessor, focuses on a group of schoolgirls who form a group to expose bullies at their school.

== Cast ==
=== Main ===
- Renee Bailey as Leila Harris
- Amelia Brooks as Grace Ellington
- Lashay Anderson as Clara Harris
- Ashling O'Shea as Rumi Joshi
- Elliott Wooster as Sam

=== Recurring ===
- Asha Banks as Brooke
- Kat Ronney as Viola
- Don Gilet as Coach Harris
- Aaron Garland as Reece
- Olivia-Mai Barrett as Meg "Mouse" Beeman
- Ramanique Ahluwalia as Jess
- Ryan Quarmby as Miles
- Kirsty Hoiles as Ms Carson
- Niyi Akin as Evan

=== Guest ===
- Jessie Mae Alonzo as May
- Jake Dunn as Christopher

== Development ==
Following the premiere of Get Even on BBC iPlayer in 2020, production on a follow-up series relating to Get Even began a year later. The BBC confirmed that the series, titled Rebel Cheer Squad, would be set in the same school with the students from Get Even having graduated and the DGM being inspirations to the new students at Bannerman School. The BBC hinted that the programme would follow friends and cheerleaders Grace, Clara and Rumi becoming the new DGM to pursue justice for their school, while also "experiencing the twists and turns of teenage life". Bustle noted that some viewers of Get Even were hoping for a continuation of the series, Rebel Cheer Squad would still feature the spirit of its prior series, just via a new generation of students. Like Get Even, the series was filmed at Bolton School, one of the largest private schools in England.

Like Get Even, Rebel Cheer Squad is based on one of the books from the Don't Get Mad book series by author Gretchen McNeil. The series is a co-production between the BBC, Netflix and Boat Rocker Studios. The series began airing on CBBC on 14 February 2022, with a simultaneous release of all eight episodes on BBC iPlayer. The series was internationally distributed on Netflix on 29 July 2022.

== Episodes ==
No.	Title	Directed by	Written by	Original release date
1	"Get Going"	Claire Tailyour	Holly Phillips	14 February 2022
After cheerleader May announces her decision to leave the team and Bannerman altogether, teammates Grace, Clara and Rumi decide to investigate the potential of bullying within the school. Grace, who is running for school president, assures voters that she would prioritise making the school a safe place in the wake of May's departure. Leila, Clara's sister and teammate, collapses whilst the squad are performing. Grace, Clara and Rumi conclude that she has been drugged through her flask and vow to find the culprit via sleuthing tactics used by their predecessors, DGM. They go to retrieve her flask to find it has been taken, to which they agree to look at the CCTV footage.
2	"Get Bad"	Claire Tailyour	Sameera Steward	14 February 2022
After getting access to the CCTV footage and learning teammate Viola was around Leila's flask, they assume that she is the one who drugged Leila, naming the suspect X. DGM acquire video proof of her bullying teammate Mouse and send the video out to the entire school, getting her expelled by Ms Carson. However, Clara later realises that Viola may not have been responsible for it. DGM are later warned over Bannerman's speaker system, telling them to watch their backs.
3	"Get Messy"	Claire Tailyour	Shazia Rashid	14 February 2022
Whilst cleaning the toilets together as part of a detention programme, Jess tells Rumi that she is a "go-along-girl", noting that she would do anything to please people. Rumi then decides to try out for the Bannerman cheer squad, and due to being a trained ballet dancer, she uses her skills and is accepted onto the squad. Grace agrees to go on a romantic date with Miles and the pair share a kiss. Afterwards, she goes to Evan's house to warn him that Reece could be out to harm him at the forthcoming rugby came. A car then arrives at his house, but speeds away when the driver sees Grace.
4	"Get Closer"	Claire Tailyour	Dan Braham	14 February 2022
After DGM discover that the car belongs to Reece, they begin surveilling his movements around the school. They overhear him stating that he wants to replace Evan as captain of the rugby team, which Grace tells Evan. The two fight whilst playing rugby but eventually make up. Whilst leaving the match, another anonymous message plays across the school speakers. Paint then begins pouring over the male students in the locker room showers. DGM rush to the microphone to see who is behind the message, only to find a prerecorded message from a dictaphone playing out.
5	"Get Dressed"	Nigel Douglas	Karissa Hamilton-Bannis	14 February 2022
Sam wears glittery makeup to school which gets them in trouble due to the dress code. Reece then makes a homophobic comment to Sam which inspires them to wear a skirt. Sam receives another punishment from Ms Carson, so DGM get the entire school to defy the dress code in support of Sam. She then changes the dress code to be more inclusive. Rumi gets into a prestigious ballet school, but tells her parents that she did not get accepted as she no longer wants to do ballet. Rumi tells Jess about her fears to come out to her family, and due to being in a previous difficult relationship with a closeted girl, Jess tells Rumi that she does not want to continue their relationship.
6	"Get Caught"	Nigel Douglas	Sameera Steward	14 February 2022
Rumi informs her parents that she got accepted into ballet school but that she does not want to do ballet, to which they accept her wishes. Rumi tells Jess that she has told her parents the truth and asks her on a date. An anonymous post is shared about Rumi lying to people about getting into ballet school, and then at a school concert, a video is played about Bannerman being a bad school. DGM arrange a study night to which Mouse asks if she can be invited, but when she arrives at Grace's house, they have forgotten about the study night due to having an emergency meeting about X. Mouse overhears them talking and accidentally reveals a detail about X that was not public knowledge, revealing herself as the perpetrator.
7	"Get Mad"	Nigel Douglas	Holly Phillips	14 February 2022
Mouse explains that the motive for her schemes was to tarnish Bannerman's reputation due to their lack of support for when she was bullied by Viola. She asks if she can be part of DGM, and they accept, with the plan to secretly gather evidence to expose Mouse. However, Mouse suspects that they are playing her and destroys all of the evidence linking her to being X. When she overhears them talking about taking her down, Mouse plants performance enhancing drugs in Coach Harris' office and files an anonymous police report. He is taken away for questioning as Mouse smugly watches.
8	"Get Even"	Nigel Douglas	Holly Phillips	14 February 2022
The Bannerman cheer squad are disqualified due to potentially having had performance enhancing drugs, despite their arguments that Coach Harris is innocent. DGM discover that Mouse is avenging her brother Christopher, who was framed for murder and was unsupported by Bannerman. DGM meet with him to inform him of Mouse's antics, but Mouse twists the story to make Christopher side with her. However, Rumi plants a listening device in his bag and Mouse admits to Christopher that she is behind the crimes. DGM play the audio at the cheer competition and they are then allowed to compete; they go on go win the competition.
