= Ripley Parker =

British writer (born 2000)

- Born: 17 December 2000 (age 25); Kensal Rise, London, England
- Occupation: Writer
- Years active: 2019–present
- Parents: Ol Parker (father); Thandiwe Newton (mother)
- Relatives: Nico Parker (sister)

Ripley Parker (born 17 December 2000) is an English writer. She created the Netflix series Everything Now (2023). She is the daughter of Thandiwe Newton and Ol Parker. She is the older sister of Nico Parker.

== Early life ==
Ripley Parker was born on 17 December 2000 at home to film director and screenwriter Ol Parker and actress Thandiwe Newton, Parker is from Kensal Rise, North West London. She has a younger sister, Nico, and a younger brother. Through Newton, the Parker children are descendants of a line of Shona chieftains of Zimbabwe. Her godfather is English actor Jason Isaacs.

In 2017, Newton said that she was proud of her daughter Ripley following an incident where she walked over to Boris Johnson and called him a “cunt” at a West End theatre play. Parker has since admitted it was a “rogue move” but one that she “would make again”.

== Career ==
Ripley contributed an essay to It's Not OK to Feel Blue (and Other Lies): Inspirational People Open Up About Their Mental Health, in 2019. She created the Netflix series Everything Now, formerly known as The Fuck It Bucket. Parker served as the lead writer and an executive producer on the series, writing five of its eight episodes.Parker drew on her own experiences and feelings about adolescence when developing Everything Now. The story expanded as she collaborated with other writers, producers, and consultants.

Available on the streaming platform from October 2023, PinkNews described Parker’s depiction of a sixth-former recovering from disordered eating, as “sensitively written”. Parker has discussed this as an area of life she had struggled with as a teenager, and therefore "felt I could speak on with some authority, and that I might have something useful to impart to people."

Parker is reportedly working on a musical based on the music of The Smiths, and a play about 19th century American poet Emily Dickinson. In March 2023 she was confirmed to be adapting fantasy novel Lies We Sing to the Sea by Sarah Underwood, for film.The project was being developed by Archery Pictures, with Kris Thykier producing.

She is working on the Harry Potter television series as a writer.

== Personal life ==
Her father Ol Parker's script for the 2022 film Ticket to Paradise with Julia Roberts and George Clooney, was reportedly born out of a conversation between him and Ripley.
