= Get Even (TV series) =

British television series

- Genre: Teen drama; Thriller
- Created by: Holly Phillips
- Based on: Don't Get Mad by Gretchen McNeil
- Starring: Kim Adis; Mia McKenna-Bruce; Bethany Antonia; Jessica Alexander; Joe Flynn; Emily Carey; Kit Clarke; Jake Dunn; Joe Ashman; Ayumi Spyrides; Priya Blackburn; Joelle Bromidge; Razan Nassar; Isaac Rouse
- Composer: Esther Joy Lane
- Country of origin: United Kingdom
- Original language: English
- No. of series: 1
- No. of episodes: 10

Production
- Executive producers: Lucy Martin; Chapman Maddox; Bob Higgins
- Producer: Josh Dynevor
- Editors: Lindsey Dillion-Massey; Emma Collins
- Running time: 24–28 minutes
- Production companies: BBC Children's Productions; Netflix; Boat Rocker Studios

Original release
- Network: BBC iPlayer
- Release: 14 February 2020

Related
- Rebel Cheer Squad

Get Even is a British teen thriller television series that premiered on BBC iPlayer on 14 February 2020. The series was adapted by Holly Phillips from the book series Don't Get Mad by Gretchen McNeil, and focuses on a group of schoolgirls who form a group to expose bullies at their school. In August 2020, the series was acquired by Netflix and distributed internationally. In February 2022, BBC premiered a spin-off series, Rebel Cheer Squad.

== Premise ==
Kitty Wei, Bree Deringer, Margot Rivers and Olivia Hayes form DGM (Don't Get Mad) to expose the bullies at their school. However, when one of their targets is murdered by an unknown attacker and holds a note saying "DGM" in his hand, the girls realise somebody is trying to frame them for his murder. Series of such events continue which make their suspicion strong about someone being after them.

The series then covers their investigation and ends on a cliffhanger.

== Cast and characters ==
=== Main ===
- Kim Adis as Kitty Wei, a girl who feels pressured to overachieve due to her parents' high expectations.
- Mia McKenna-Bruce as Bree Deringer, a girl who has a rich father and frequently gets into trouble at school.
- Bethany Antonia as Margot Rivers, an American girl who enjoys gaming in her free time and hasn't got many friends at school.
- Jessica Alexander as Olivia Hayes, a girl who is perceived to be the typical rich girl, but actually comes from a poor background.
- Joe Flynn as Ronny Kent, a self-entitled boy who steals and posts private photos of Mika online. He is murdered by being pushed out of his bedroom window.
- Emily Carey as Mika Cavanaugh, a sheltered girl whose private photos are stolen and posted online without her consent.
- Kit Clarke as Logan, lead actor of the drama club, who is interested in Margot.
- Jake Dunn as Christopher Beeman, the theatre director and Logan's best friend.
- Joe Ashman as Rex Cavanaugh, a childhood friend of Bree, Amber's boyfriend and Mika's brother.
- Ayumi Spyrides as Camilla, the captain of the girls football team. She was in an illegal and abusive relationship with Coach Creed, which was exposed by DGM.
- Priya Blackburn as Meera, a friend of Olivia's who secretly dislikes her.
- Joelle Bromidge as Jemima, a friend of Olivia's.
- Razan Nassar as Amber, the most popular girl in school and Olivia's best friend, Rex's girlfriend and a member of the drama club.
- Isaac Rouse as John, Bree's best friend and her closest confidant.

=== Recurring ===
- Jack Derges as Coach Richard Creed, a PE teacher who is in an illegal and abusive relationship with Camilla. He is an extremely unpleasant character, not caring who he hurts.
- Elaine Tan as Coach Evans, a PE teacher who coaches the girls' football team. She is quite arbitrary in her punishments.
- Shannon Murray as Mrs Baggott, the deputy headmistress of the school, and the mother of John.
- Chris J Gordon as Donte, Olivia's boyfriend.
- Charlie Anson as Mr Harrington, headmaster of Bannerman school.
- Dylan Brady as Ed, a student at the school and friend of Margot.
- Danny Griffin as Shane, a boy interested in Bree.
- Gerard Fletcher as Detective Bartlett, one of the detectives investigating Ronny's death.
- Natasha Atherton as Detective Misra, one of the detectives investigating Ronny's death.

== Episodes ==
No.	Title	Directed by	Written by	Original release date
1	"Get on It"	Sarah Walker	Holly Phillips	14 February 2020
Kitty attempts to earn team captain on the football team, and when she does not get it, she lies to her parents due to the pressure of their expectations. While at a house party, Ronny takes Mika's phone and posts photos of her in her underwear. Kitty feels incensed by this, so calls a meeting between herself, Olivia, Margot and Bree. The four, known as DGM, plot to expose Ronny.
2	"Get in Deep"	Sarah Walker	Holly Phillips	14 February 2020
As part of the plan to expose Ronny, Olivia distracts him on a fake date, which he posts about online. Margot assists Bree to sneak into his house and download his laptop files onto a USB stick. Olivia's boyfriend Donte sees the photo of her and Ronny online, and ends their relationship. Later, Kitty sees Ronny's dead body on his front lawn, with a note saying "DGM" in his hand.
3	"Get It Together"	Max Myers	Sameera Steward	14 February 2020
DGM realise they are being framed for Ronny's murder, and compile a suspect list. Olivia is questioned by the police, who ask her about the online photo taken before Ronny's death. Bree discovers that the PE teacher, Coach Creed, was paying Ronny regular monthly instalments that ended just before his death. Although he was formerly suspended, he later arrives back at the school.
4	"Get Over It"	Max Myers	Kate O'Connell-Lauder	14 February 2020
Bree attends detention with Rex, where she questions him on Ronny's death. Logan asks Margot on a date, which she initially declines, but later accepts his invitation. DGM take Camilla's phone to see if there is anything incriminating on it, and find creepy sexual messages from Coach Creed.
5	"Get What You Want"	Max Myers	Dan Berlinka	14 February 2020
DGM send out screenshots of Coach Creed's messages with Camilla to parents and students, and he is arrested. Bree is confronted by two detectives who find origami with her fingerprints on in Ronny's house.
6	"Get a Clue"	Andrew Gunn	Sameera Steward	14 February 2020
Bree is questioned by the police, who have connected that Bree's school absences coincide with DGM's pranks. Margot hacks into Ronny's WiFi router, and the logs reveal that Rex was in Ronny's house the night he was murdered. At a party, Mika gets up on stage and talks about how Ronny used and manipulated her. On her way to school, Mika is confronted by an unknown figure.
7	"Get Out of Hand"	Andrew Gunn	Dan Berlinka	14 February 2020
Olivia goes to Rex's house, and snoops around until Amber arrives. While they are talking, Rex receives a call and heads out. He then calls Amber, and tells her that Mika has been found dead in a reservoir. The copy of Ronny's laptop that Olivia downloaded reveals that he catfished Christopher and made him send nude photos, which he later blackmailed him with.
8	"Get Through It"	Andrew Gunn	Sameera Steward and Marissa Lestrade	14 February 2020
Feeling guilty over what happened to Mika, Kitty decides to leave DGM. The police receive a tip-off that there is something incriminating in Christopher's locker. When they search it, they find a DGM note identical to one discovered with Ronny's dead body. He is then arrested for his murder.
9	"Get It Out"	Andrew Gunn	Holly Phillips	14 February 2020
Margot discovers that it was Olivia who stole her diary and made fun of it with her friends, so she takes the day off school to spend it with Logan. While in his car, she discovers a DGM note. She asks why he has it, and Logan lies by saying he is DGM. Amber apologises to Olivia for trying to change her, then the pair share romantic feelings, and a kiss. Bree helps Detective Misra to carry files into her car, and takes Donte's. His file reveals that his alibi for Ronny's death is driving alone, so unverifiable. Kitty kisses Donte, and he takes her to the reservoir.
10	"Get Justice"	Andrew Gunn	Holly Phillips	14 February 2020
When Olivia attempts to come out, her mother misinterprets what she means. John tells Bree that he loves her, but she shuts him down. Logan continues to insist that he is DGM, so Margot forces Logan to admit to the murder of Ronny and Mika. DGM work together to capture his confession on tape, and they expose him in front of the school by playing the tape during the school play. Logan manages to escape, but is later arrested when he meets Margot to warn her that DGM are in danger. At a DGM meeting, Kitty confesses that the school are not renewing her scholarship at the school, and the girls vow to save her scholarship as their next mission.
