= List of Grishaverse characters =

The Grishaverse is a fictional shared universe of multiple series of fantasy novels, short stories, and a television adaptation created by author Leigh Bardugo. The universe consists of the nations of Ravka, Fjerda, Shu Han, Kerch, Novyi Zem, and the Wandering Isle, each of which adapts elements of language, culture, and tradition from countries of the real world (elements in turn drawn from different real time periods). The magic system of the universe is the 'small science,' an art practiced by magic-users called Grisha with the ability to manipulate matter at its fundamental level. As of 2021, there are nine novels in the Grishaverse: the Shadow and Bone trilogy, the Six of Crows duology, the King of Scars duology, and two short-story collections.

== Introduced in the Shadow and Bone trilogy ==
=== Alina Starkov ===
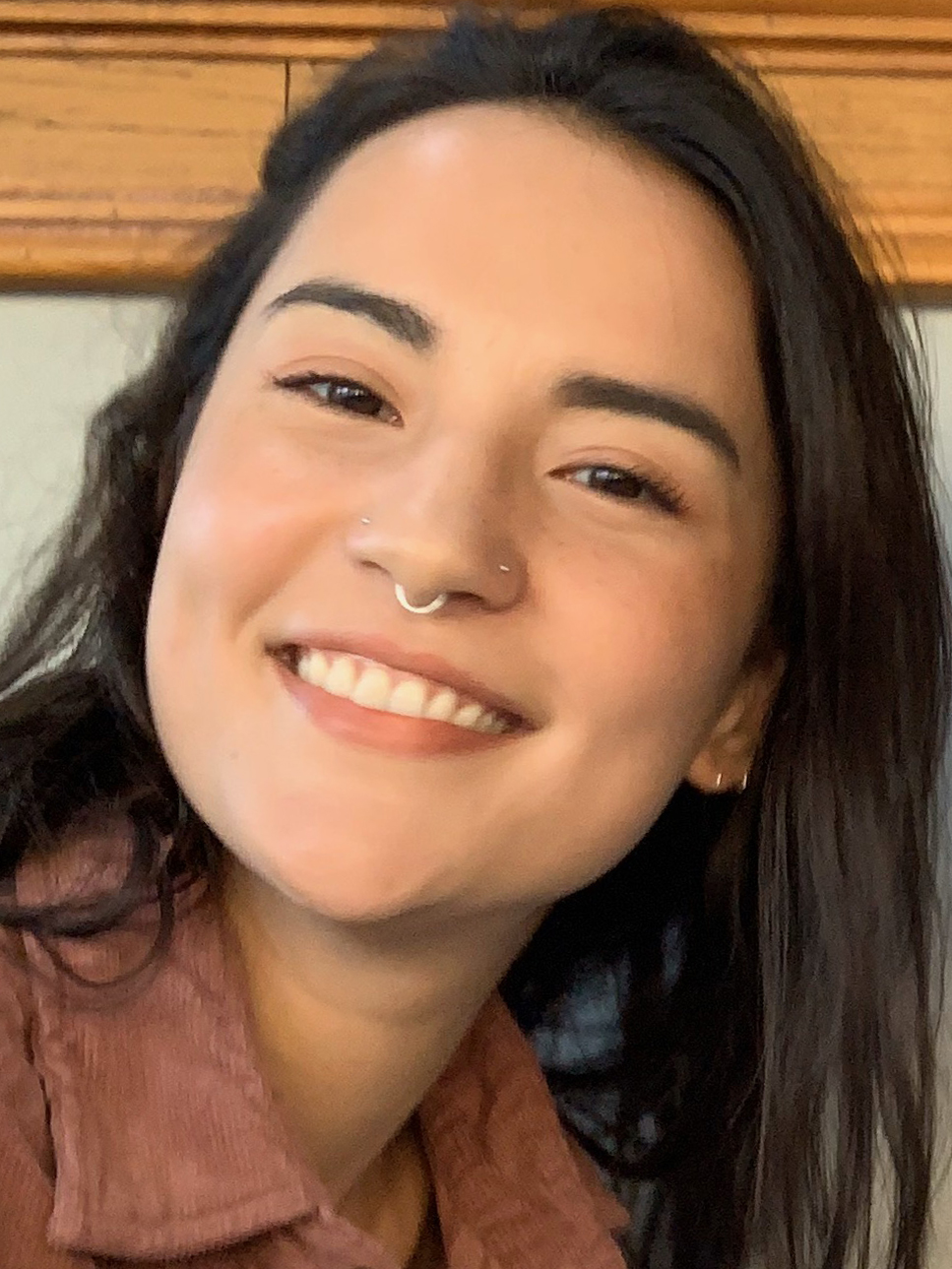
Jessie Mei Li in 2019.

Alina Starkov is a Sun Summoner and Saint. Orphaned at a young age by the Border Wars, she joins the First Army as a cartographer. On an expedition into the Shadow Fold, a sea of darkness inhabited by the light-fearing volcra, she discovers her magical abilities, which she had subconsciously repressed. She trains at the Little Palace and grows to love her powers, and has a brief romance with the Darkling. Upon realising the Darkling is not who she thought he was, she goes on a mission to find Morozova's amplifiers and taps into merzost to give herself enough power to take on the Darkling and destroy the Fold. However, doing so comes with a cost, and she ultimately loses both the amplifiers and her power. Afterwards, her Sun Summoning powers are dispersed randomly throughout the Ravkan population, and Alina steps down as leader of the Grisha to marry Mal. Later, the pair own their Keramzin orphanage with their young companion Misha.

She is the main character in both the book and show adaption and first-person narrator of the Shadow and Bone trilogy. She makes a cameo in Rule of Wolves. In the Netflix series, she is played by the lead actress Jessie Mei Li.

=== The Darkling ===
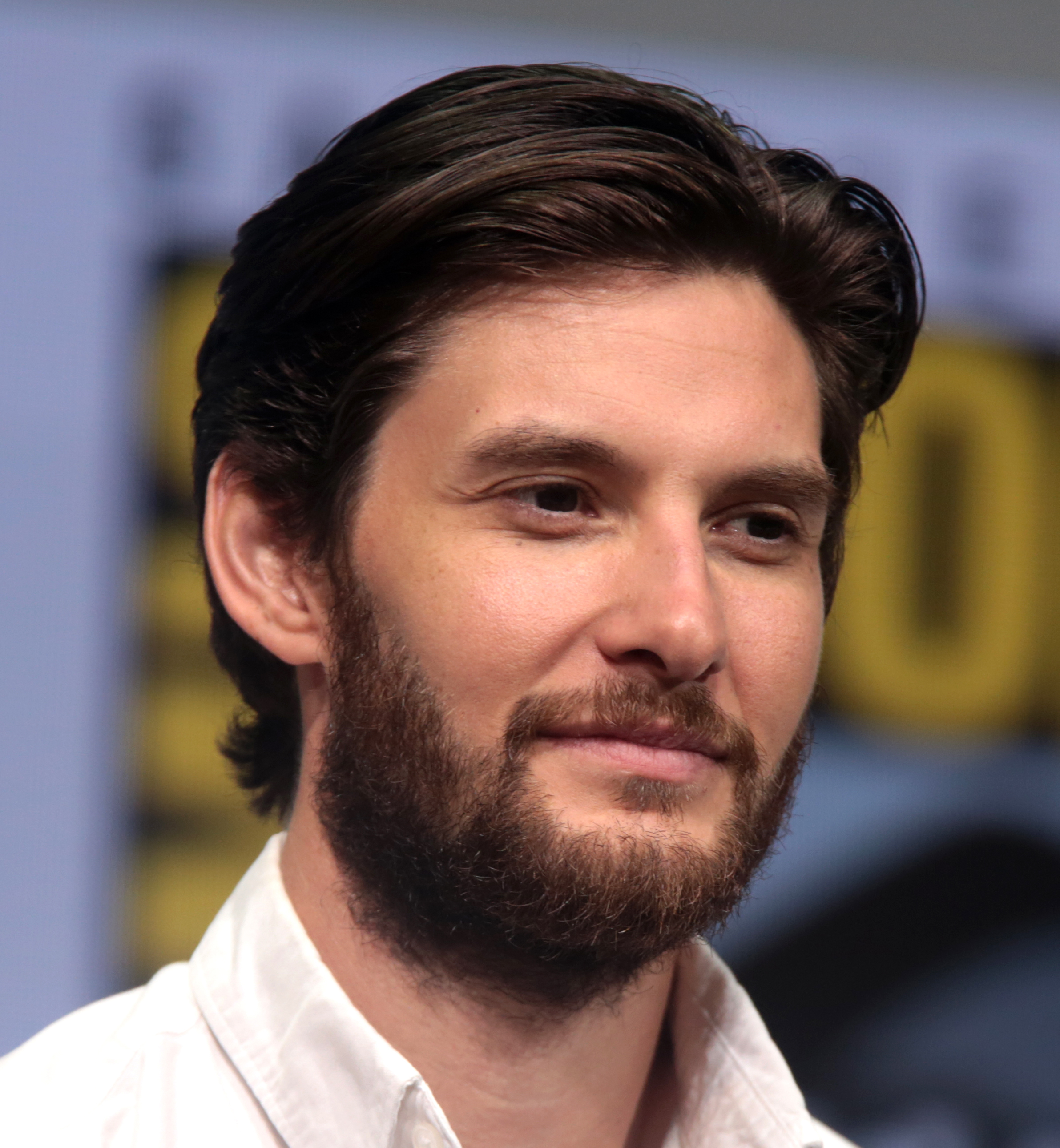
Ben Barnes in 2017

Aleksander Morozova, also known as the Darkling, is an ambitious Shadow Summoner, living amplifier and commander of the Second Army. He was originally a normal boy with a unique gift who spent his childhood as a fugitive due to heavy persecution against the Grisha and lived for hundreds of years attempting to keep the Grisha safe from that persecution. He made a deal with King Yevgeni to grant Grisha protection at the Little Palace in exchange for an army. As he began experimenting with merzost, he accidentally created the Shadow Fold, a region dividing Ravka in half. He executes a coup against the king in Siege and Storm with the aid of his nichevo'ya, monsters made of darkness, but is killed by Alina in Ruin and Rising. In King of Scars, he is reborn in the body of a loyal acolyte to his cause after a failed exorcism called the obisbaya. In Rule of Wolves, he sentences himself to eternal torture in order to keep the Shadow Fold from regenerating and consuming Ravka.

The Darkling is the main antagonist in the Shadow and Bone trilogy and the main character in the short prequel The Demon in the Wood, which features the Darkling in his childhood. In the Netflix series, he is played by Ben Barnes and goes by General Kirigan as one of his aliases.

=== Nikolai Lantsov ===
Nikolai Lanstov is introduced disguised as the privateer Sturmhond. He is revealed to be the younger prince of Ravka and courts Alina for a political marriage, and the two grow close. After being transformed into a shadow demon and turned back into a human, his consciousness is tied to a demon. Even though he is illegitimate, the throne passes to him upon the king's exile and his brother's death. He wants to his people but struggles with his position, and ultimately relinquishes the throne to Zoya. After forming a reluctant acceptance over his demon, he allows it to stay within him and uses it to fight for him in various battles against Fjerda. He is in a romantic relationship with Zoya Nazyalensky. Despite being a member of the Ravkan royal family, both Nikolai's biological parents are Fjerdan. Nikolai's mother was a Fjerdan princess and his father is Fjerdan Magnus Opjer.

Nikolai is introduced in Siege and Storm and is one of the main characters of the King of Scars duology. He appears in the second season of Shadow and Bone and is played by Patrick Gibson.

=== Zoya Nazyalensky ===
Zoya Nazyalensky is a competitive Grisha Squaller with the ability to summon wind. Prior to the events of the novels she was an admirer of the Darkling. She is hostile towards Alina at first, but joins her and turns on him when her aunt is killed by the expansion of the Fold. She becomes a member of the Grisha Triumvirate, who replaced the Darkling in commanding the Second Army. After she learned under Sankt Juris, she gains the ability to tap into Grisha powers other than her own and receives his mythical dragon powers. She is appointed Queen after Nikolai relinquishes the throne. She is in a romantic relationship with Nikolai Lantsov.

She is introduced as side antagonist turned protagonist in the Shadow and Bone trilogy and a main point-of-view in the King of Scars series. She appears in Crooked Kingdom in a minor role. Zoya is played by Sujaya Dasgupta in the Netflix series.

=== Malyen Oretsev ===
Mal is a skilled tracker in the First Army and Alina's childhood friend who is popular with girls. Even though he is Alina's love interest, they have an argumentative, on-off relationship, and he is skeptical of her powers and newfound role saving Ravka. Despite his reluctance, he leads the revolution. Throughout the series, Mal is involved in a 'love square' revolving around Alina Starkov, also involving Nikolai Lantsov and Aleksander Morozova, the Darkling In Rule of Wolves, Mal is critical to the Darkling's escape after he is stabbed by a piece of thorn wood allowing the Darkling to gain some of his power over darkness.

Although he is introduced in Shadow and Bone, he has a more prominent role in the following two books. He also makes a cameo in Rule of Wolves. He is played by Archie Renaux in the television series.

=== Baghra ===
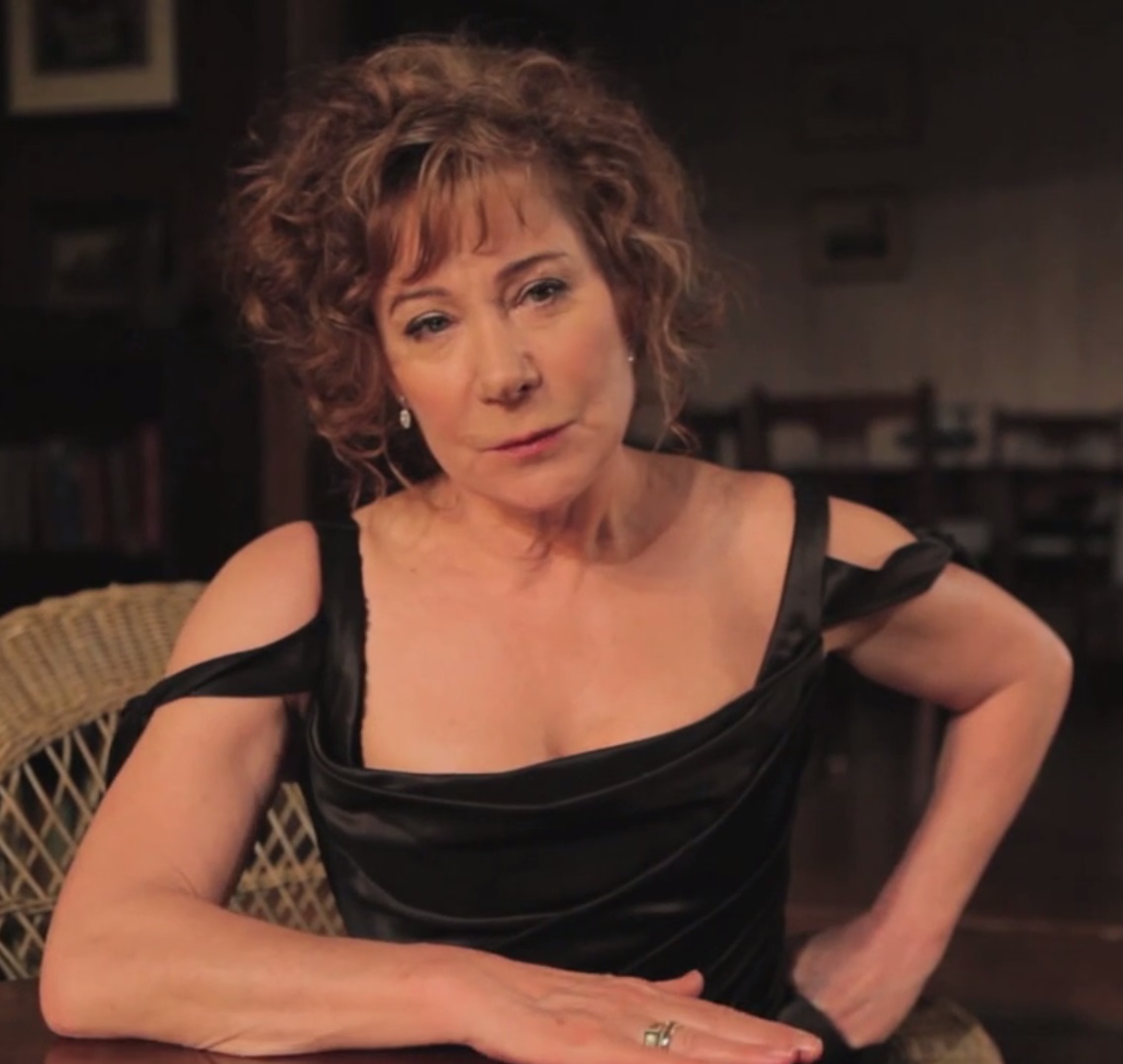
Zoe Wanamaker in 2013.

Baghra is a Shadow Summoner who is introduced as a tough instructor to Alina at the Little Palace. She reveals herself to be the Darkling's mother, who intentionally conceived and raised him with the intention of making him powerful. She fears he has gone too far and attempts to intervene by encouraging Alina to run away, but is punished by her own son. She kills herself midway through the third book to stop her son's forces, which leaves him heartbroken and grieving.

Baghra appears in the original trilogy and is portrayed at a younger age in The Demon in the Wood. She is also the mother of Ulla, who appears in the short story "When Water Sang Fire". She is played by Zoë Wanamaker in the Netflix series.

=== Genya Safin ===
Genya Safin is a Tailor known for her beauty. She helps Alina when she arrives at the Little Palace. Unlike the rest of the Grisha, Genya is assigned to work for the Queen. However, she is sexually abused by the King and the Queen resents her for it. Genya remains loyal to the Darkling, but his nichevo'ya mutilate her when she betrays him to help Alina escape in Siege and Storm. She joins Alina and helps in taking the King down. She marries David Kostyk and becomes a member of the Grisha Triumvirate. She later appears in Crooked Kingdom to free Grisha captives being transferred in Ketterdam and restore Wylan's original face. In the King of Scars novels, Genya helps rule Ravka and is involved in all of the important war talks. Genya is known for her love of parties and event planning.

Genya has pale skin, red hair and amber eyes. She also wears an eyepatch following the attack from the Darkling. She wears a red kefta with blue embroidery.

Genya is a prominent character in the original trilogy. She also appears in Crooked Kingdom and the King of Scars novels. She is played by Daisy Head, a British actress, in the Netflix series.

=== David Kostyk ===
David Kostyk is a bookish and unassuming Durast. A shy but intelligent figure, he crafts weapons and other gadgets for Alina and the other Grisha to use. In the first novel, he forges the Stag's amplifier together into a collar for Alina. He becomes a member of Ravka's ruling Grisha Triumvirate due to his contributions to the war effort, and creates military weapons in the war against Fjerda. He is killed when Fjerda bombs Os Alta but his blueprints continue to be used and eventually help lead to Ravka's victory over Fjerda. At his funeral, Genya, Zoya, and Nikolai are emotionally affected by his death not only because of his intellect but because of how loyal and steadfast he was to their cause.

He is played by Luke Pasqualino in the television series.

=== Tamar and Tolya ===
Tamar Kir-Bataar and Tolya Yul-Bataar are Heartrender twins who are part of Sturmhond's crew. They become loyal to Alina and recognise her Sainthood. Tolya is a hulking but gentle man, steadfastly loyal to Nikolai and Alina with a passion towards poetry. Tamar is smaller, lithe and a warrior who uses twin axes to fight against enemies. Despite their Shu heritage, they see themselves as Ravkan, however Tamar joins Shu Han's cause to overthrow their corrupt queen in Rule of Wolves. The pair both survive to the end of the series and are present at Zoya's coronation.

They are introduced in the second book. They appear in the second season of the Netflix series, with Tolya being played by Lewis Tan and Tamar being played by Anna Leong Brophy.

=== Nadia and Adrik Zhabin ===
Nadia is a Squaller and former student at the Little Palace, friends with Marie, and later became instrumental in the effort to depose the Darkling. She becomes friends with Alina early on, a clingy but loyal figure. Like Alina, she was trained by Baghra. She later marries Tamar and helps lead the nation of Ravka several years after the war.

Nadia's brother, Adrik, is introduced in Siege and Storm as a young up-and-coming Grisha who joins the rebellion with Alina and her makeshift crew to hunt down the final amplifier. After having his arm shorn off by nichevo'ya, he becomes grumpy and moody, a character trait for which he becomes notorious several years later. Despite that, he continues exemplifying his loyalty to the throne and sticks with Nikolai even after he witnesses the other man's demon killing others.

Nadia is played by Gabrielle Brooks in Season 1 and Joanna McGibbon in Season 2. Marie is played by Jasmine Blackborow in the first season, and Adrik was introduced in the second season, played by Alistair Nwachukwu.

=== Ivan and Fedyor ===
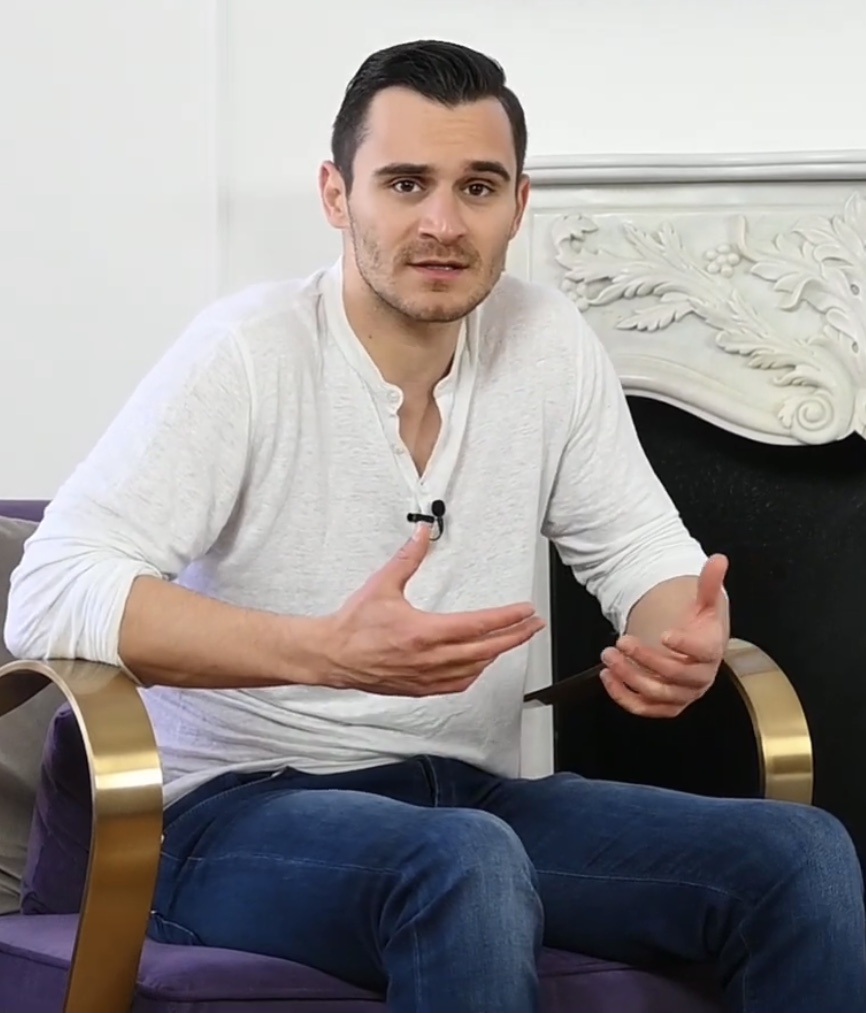
Julian Kostov in 2021.

Ivan is a Grisha Heartrender and one of the Darkling's favored bodyguards in the Oprichniki. He possesses an Amplifier and is described in the books as being "tall, handsome young man with bronze skin and wavy, brown hair." He is stern, favoring a no-nonsense approach to his work. Fedyor Kaminsky is also a Grisha Heartrender and is often with Ivan. He has a cheerful and flirty demeanor, though takes his job seriously without any hesitation. The pair are most notable for escorting Alina to the Little Palace during the events of Shadow and Bone. After the Darkling expands the Fold, Ivan remains loyal to the Darkling and stays with him till his death, while Fedyor sides with Alina only to be killed by the Darkling.

Simon Sears portrays Ivan and Julian Kostov plays Fedyor in the show, where they are depicted as a romantic couple.

=== The Apparat ===
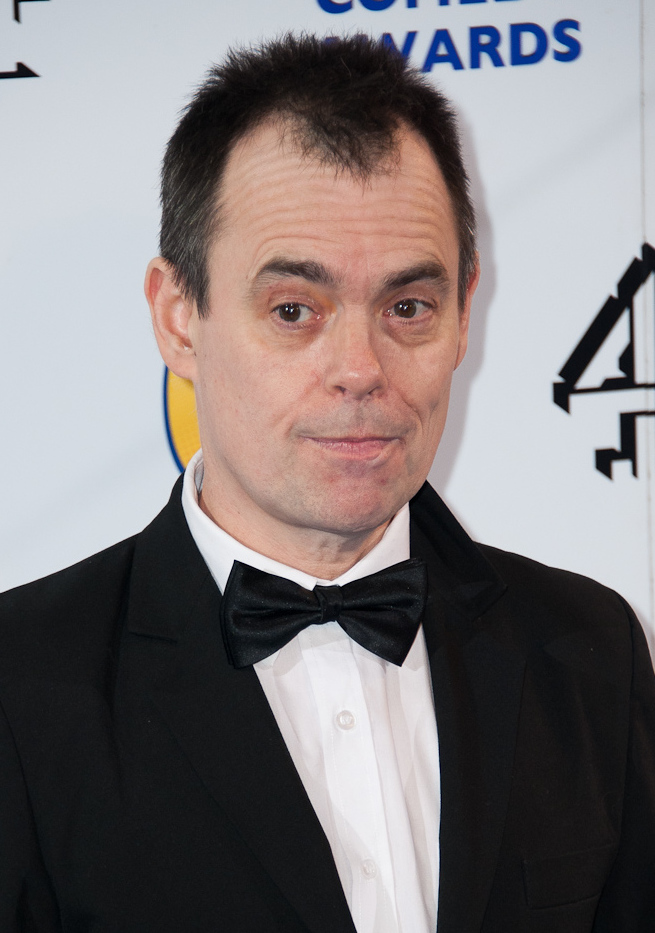
Kevin Eldon in 2013.

The Apparat is a wily, schemeful man who joins whatever side is dominating in the war between Ravka and the other nations. Originally the counselor to Ravka's king and queen, he leads the underground rebellion against the Darkling and is critical in their propaganda effort by turning Alina into a Saint. Afterwards, he leaves Ravka and joins Fjerda when it seems like Ravka is going to be destroyed. He attempts to kill Nina during Rule of Wolves but fails and later rejects Zoya's appointment as Queen. He is subsequently arrested and imprisoned.

He is played by Kevin Eldon.

== Introduced in the Six of Crows duology ==
=== Kaz Brekker ===
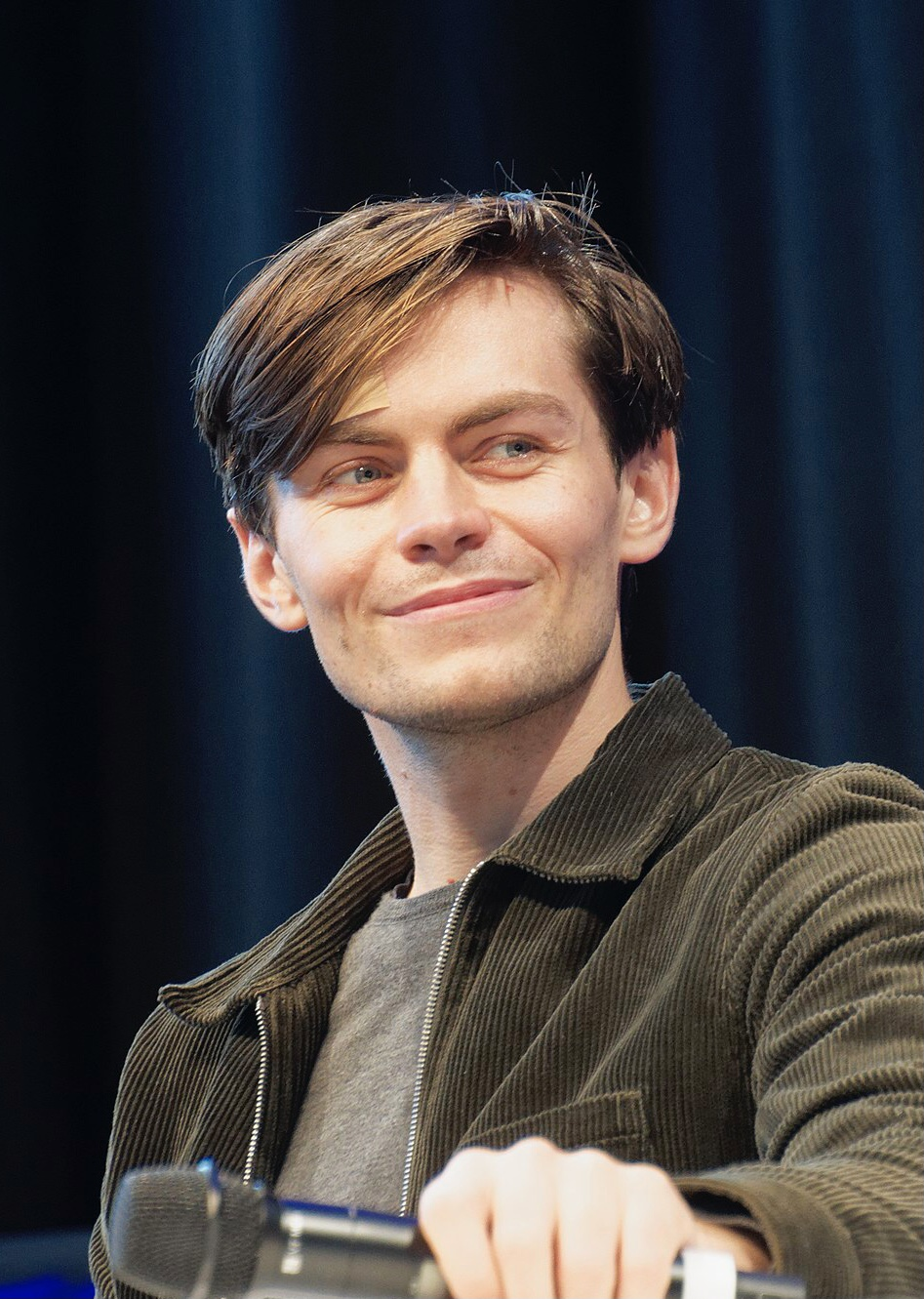
Freddy Carter in 2021.

Kaz Brekker/Rietveld, also known as Dirtyhands, is a 17-year-old master thief with a reputation for doing anything for the right price. He has a personal vendetta against Pekka Rollins, who swindled Kaz and his older brother Jordie out of all their money when they first arrived in Ketterdam. He is a lieutenant of the Dregs, and as the mastermind of the group, the de facto leader of the Crows. He is severely haphephobic due to a traumatizing incident in his childhood, and thus always wears black leather gloves. He has a limp in his right leg which Leigh Bardugo refers to in the acknowledgments section in Six of Crows. She says "I have a degenerative condition called osteonecrosis. This basically translates to 'bone death', which sounds kind of gothy and romantic, but it actually means that every step I take is painful and sometimes I need to walk with a cane. It is not a coincidence that I created a character with the same symptoms." He is described as very pale, with dark hair and dark brown eyes (blue eyes in the show). He uses a cane with a crow's head handle as a mobility aid, and occasionally as a weapon. He is in a romantic relationship with Inej Ghafa.

Kaz is a main character of the Six of Crows duology. He is played by Freddy Carter in the Netflix series.

=== Inej Ghafa ===
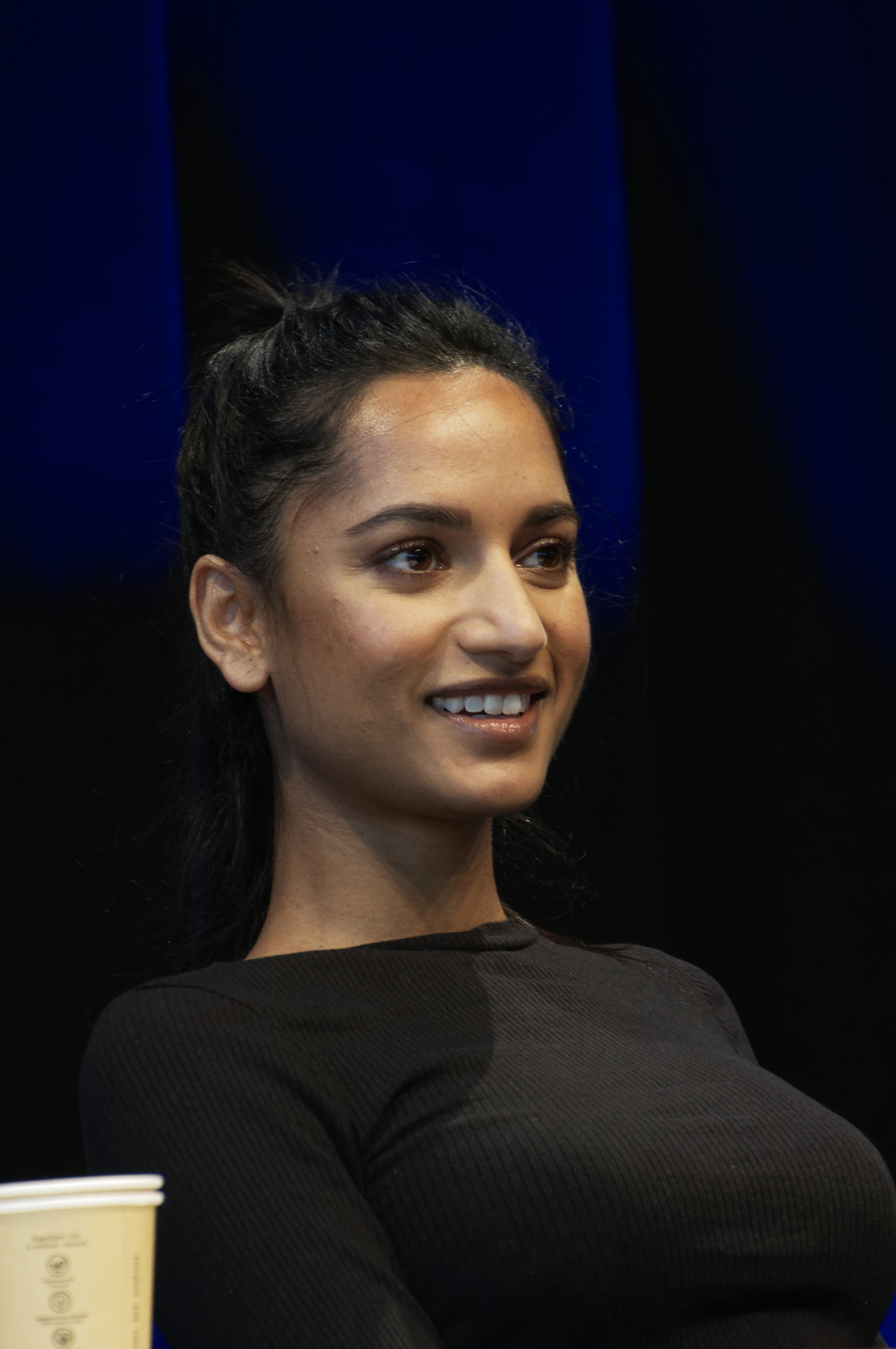
Amita Suman in 2021.

Inej Ghafa is a 16-year-old Suli girl from Ravka known as the Wraith. She is a spy for the Dregs, and considered the best spy in Ketterdam. Her family were travelling performers and her act was the tightrope, so she is extremely agile and lightfooted. She is rather superstitious, and, with the exception of Matthias, the most religious out of the Crows. Her preferred weapons are knives, and she always carries her six favourites with her, named after various Ravkan Saints. Inej was kidnapped by slavers and forced to work in a brothel called the Menagerie until Kaz Brekker purchased her indenture. Since then, she has proven invaluable to Kaz and the Dregs, working as their spy in order to earn her freedom. Eventually, Kaz gives her the indenture papers and tells her she is free to go. She then purchases a ship with the goal of hunting slavers, and is eventually reunited with her parents. She is in a romantic relationship with Kaz Brekker. She's described as short, with bronze skin and black hair, worn in a braid.

Inej is a main character of the Six of Crows duology. She is played by Amita Suman in the Netflix series.

=== Jesper Fahey ===
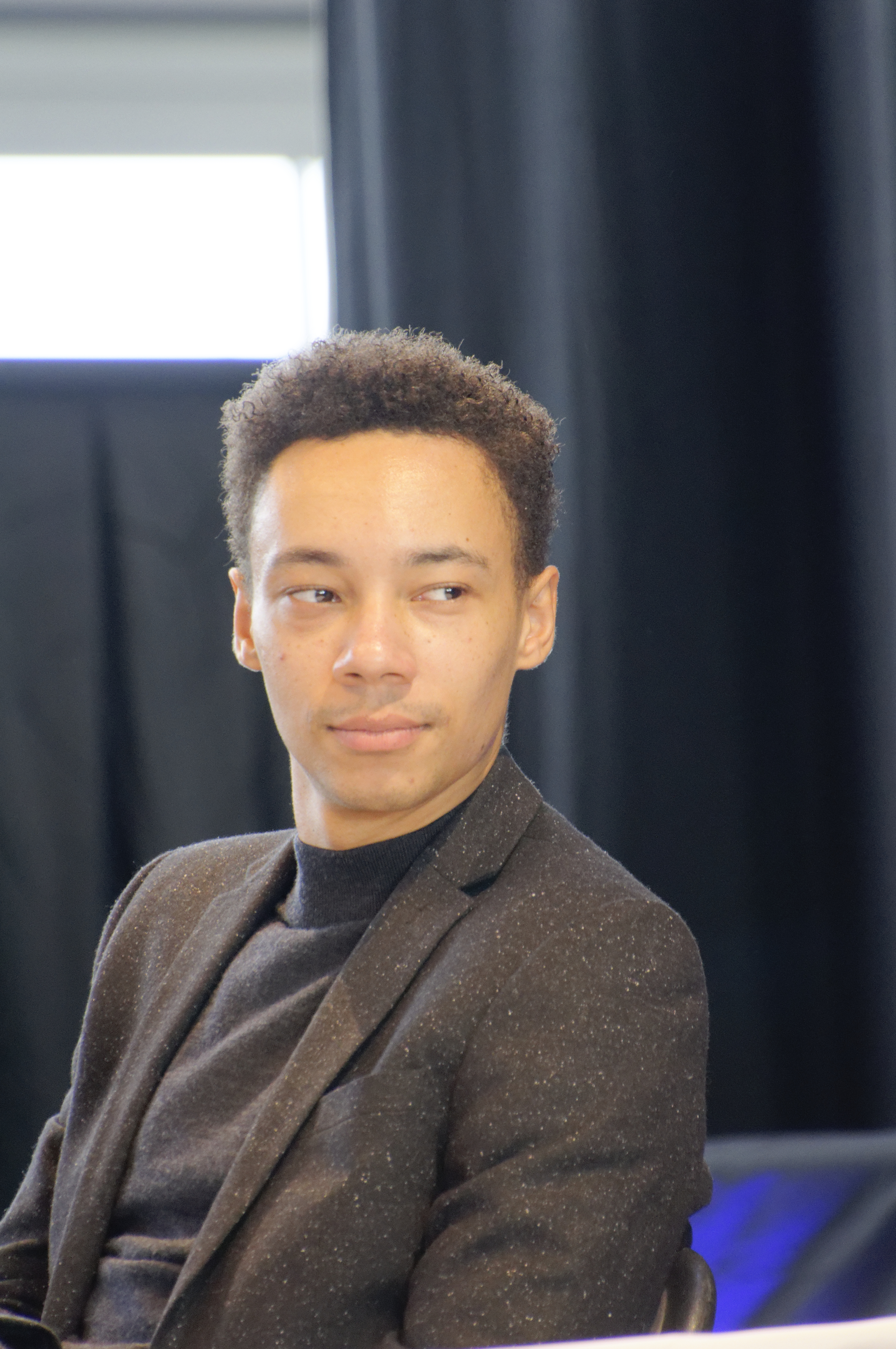
Kit Young in 2021.

Jesper Fahey is a 17-year-old Zemeni-Kaelish sharpshooter with a gambling problem. His father believes that he is studying in a university at Ketterdam. He was, until he discovered gambling and found himself deep in debt. He joins the Dregs to make money to repay them. He is described as being tall and lanky, with dark skin and grey eyes. Like his late mother, he is a Grisha Fabrikator, but he hides it to avoid being kidnapped or killed. However, this has led to him becoming very impulsive and loose-lipped, which sometimes endangers the rest of the crows. He is almost never seen without his weapons of choice, twin mother-of-pearl-handled revolvers. He is in a romantic relationship with Wylan Van Eck.

Jesper is a main character of the Six of Crows duology. He is played by Kit Young in the Netflix series.

=== Nina Zenik ===
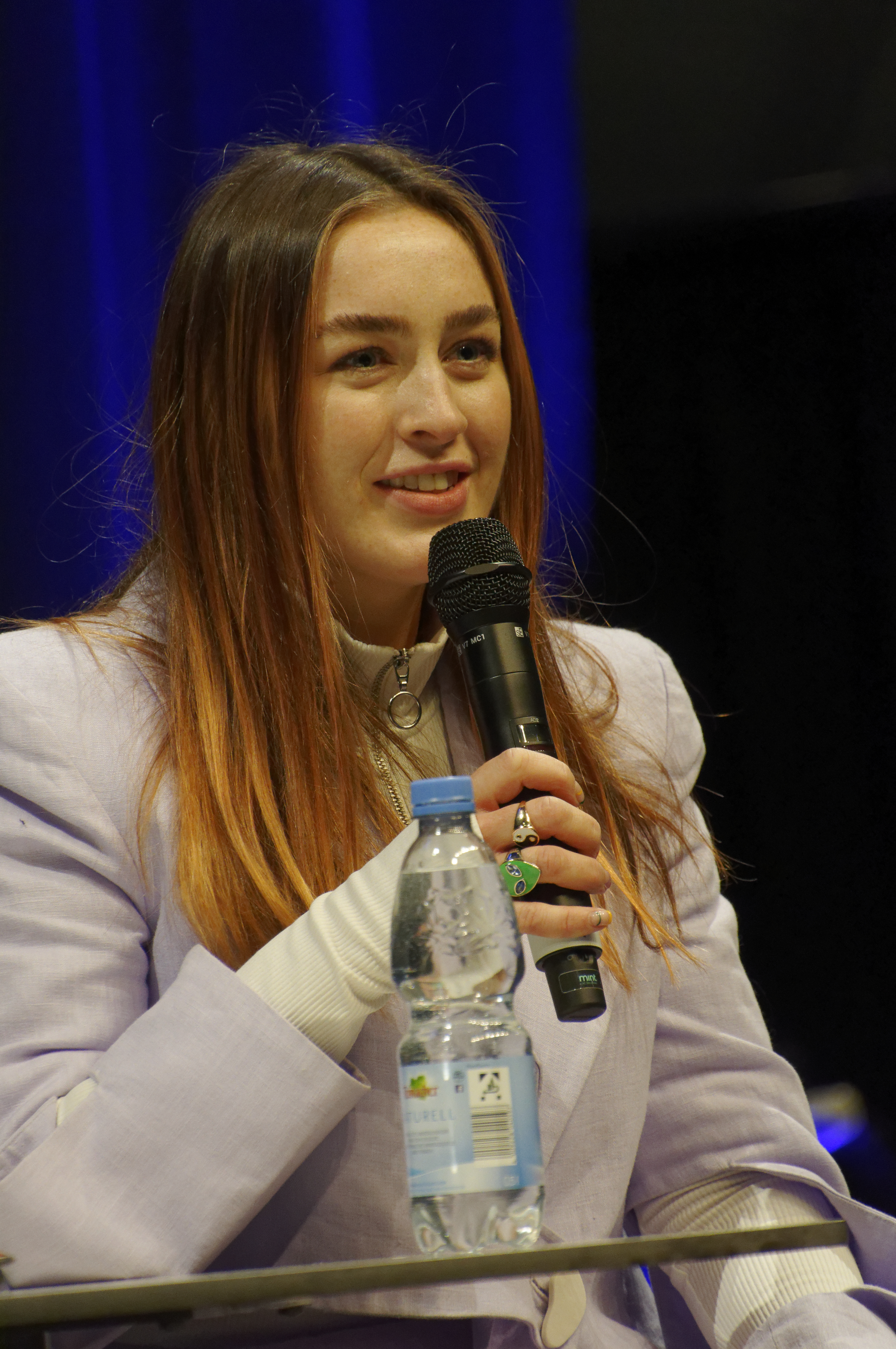
Danielle Galligan in 2021.

Nina Zenik is a seventeen-year-old Grisha Heartrender and former soldier of the Ravkan Second Army — until she was captured by Matthias. She betrayed his trust to protect him from Grisha spies, choosing to stay in Ketterdam in the hope of finding a way to free him from Hellgate. She was initially recruited to join the Dime Lions, but after meeting Inej, who brought a counteroffer from Kaz, decided to join the Dregs instead. Nina worked at the White Rose brothel, specializing in altering clients’ moods before it is destroyed in an attack. She has fair skin, thick brown hair and green eyes, and is described as round and voluptuous. After Matthias's death she embarks on a reconnaissance mission into Fjerda where she eventually becomes engaged to Hanne Brum, who has disguised herself as Fjerda's Prince Rasmus. Rather than rejoin the Grisha or Crows, she decides to stay in Fjerda.

She is initially a Heartrender, but exposure to and recuperation from jurda parem transformed her powers to control over the dead, allowing her to puppeteer inanimate bodies and bones and becoming the only known Corpsewitch.

In King of Scars, she is disguised as a Fjerdan woman named Mila Jandersdat, trying to smuggle Grisha out of Fjerda.

Nina is a main character in both the Six of Crows duology and the King of Scars duology. She is played by Danielle Galligan in the Netflix series.

=== Matthias Helvar ===
Matthias Helvar was an eighteen-year-old drüskelle from Fjerda. A year before the story, he and his fellow drüskelle kidnapped Nina and other Grisha, but were shipwrecked on their way back to Fjerda. He washed ashore with Nina and they were forced to work together to avoid freezing to death, eventually coming to trust one another and pursue something of a romantic relationship. However, Nina then accused him of being a slaver and he was incarcerated in Hellgate prison in Ketterdam. He was conflicted because of his hatred for Grisha and his feelings for Nina. Kaz frees Matthias from Hellgate because of his knowledge of the Ice Court and bribes him into working with the Crows in exchange for a pardon, which would allow him to return to Fjerda. He was the oldest, tallest and most muscular of the group with pale skin, shaved blond hair and blue eyes. He develops an understanding and care for the Grisha but is killed for it by a young drüskelle in Crooked Kingdom.

Matthias is a main character in the Six of Crows duology. He is played by Calahan Skogman in the Netflix series.

=== Wylan Van Eck ===
Wylan Van Eck is a 16-year-old merchant's son with some talent for demolition, whom Kaz takes on as a member of the crew in the hopes of using him as leverage against his father, Jan Van Eck. He is curious, contemplative, and sheltered, and, as opposed to the rest of the Crows, is uncomfortable with displays of violence. He is implied to be dyslexic, but is an excellent alchemist, mathematician, and musician. For several weeks after the successful Ice Court heist, he is tailored by Nina Zenik to look like Kuwei Yul-Bo, but he recovers his original appearance with the help of Genya Safin. He is described to have curly red-blonde hair and pale skin. His mother, Mayra Hendriks, was presumed dead, but she was actually drugged by his father and sent to an asylum after Jan Van Eck found out his son couldn't read and wanted a new heir. He is in a romantic relationship with Jesper Fahey.

Wylan is a main character in the Six of Crows duology. Renamed Wylan Hendriks, he is portrayed by Jack Wolfe in the second season of Shadow and Bone.

=== Kuwei Yul-Bo ===
Kuwei Yul-Bo is the son of Bo Yul-Bayur, the creator of jurda parem. Like his father, he is intelligent and a cunning scientist but often hides his wisdom so as to appear nonchalant. In Six of Crows, he is kidnapped by Fjerda in the hopes of creating more jurda parem to torture Grisha, but his research is burned down. He tags alongside the Crows thereafter when they recover him, fakes his own death at the end of Crooked Kingdom, and later is relocated to Ravka under a new identity where he helps create an antidote to jurda parem.

=== Pekka Rollins ===
Pekka Rollins is a Kaelish crime lord and leader of the Dime Lions, the primary rival of the Dregs and one of the leading gangs in Ketterdam. He owns the Emerald Palace, the Sweet Shop, and the Kaelish Prince. When Kaz and his brother first arrived in Ketterdam, he conned them under the alias Jakob Hertzoon which led to Kaz's long-standing hatred for him. He competes with the Dregs in their mission to infiltrate the Ice Court but is caught and imprisoned. Kaz breaks him out and later he gives the weakened Crows a loan after Inej was kidnapped. In Crooked Kingdom, Kaz threatens him by holding his young son hostage and he leaves Ketterdam alone. As part of Kaz's plan, Nina uses her new Corpsewitch abilities to create a false plague at his businesses, closing them through quarantine and crippling him financially.

He is played by Dean Lennox Kelly in a guest role in the TV series.

=== Jan Van Eck ===
Jan Van Eck is Wylan's father, a wealthy merchant who cons the Crows and looks down on those below him as lesser. He is intelligent and cunning with a sole focus on maximizing profit and gaining dominance over the merchant houses of Kerch. A manipulative man, Van Eck is the main antagonist of the Six of Crows duology, appearing as a major character in Crooked Kingdom, where he barters Inej's life to get the Crows' subservience. He is later arrested for his crimes and exposed by his son (whom he abused for eight years).

=== Per Haskell ===
Per Haskell is the former leader of the Dregs, a jaundiced elderly man who prefers to stay out of trouble and keep the Dregs away from taking risks. He lets his subordinates do all his work for him and stays in the sidelines whenever disruptions plague the Barrel. Although he has adopted Kaz and become a surrogate mentor figure to him, Kaz is known to everyone else in the Dregs as its true leader and source of power. He is egoistical, lazy, and easy to set off. Kaz later usurps him and becomes the official leader of the Dregs in name and position.

=== Tante Heleen ===
Heleen Van Houden is the owner of the Menagerie, a successful brothel located on the West Stave in Ketterdam. An oily and psychologically abusive person, she laments and prides herself in her dominance over the girls in her brothel. She deals in human trafficking despite it being an illegal trade, so she can obtain her employees, whom she sees as objects rather than people. She notably purchased Inej, who would later see her as a major figure corrupting her life. Kaz later plants a false plague at her brothel leaving her in financial ruin.

She is played by Deirdre Mullins in the television show.

=== Colm Fahey ===
Colm Fahey is a jurda farmer and Jesper's loving yet protective father. He is described as "classically Kaelish" with dark red hair, pale skin, and grey eyes. Honest and overprotective, he sticks with his values that he and his deceased wife hoped to impress onto Jesper. After his wife's death, he steadfastly forced Jesper to repress his Grisha abilities, fearing he would be persecuted if the world were to know. He appears in Crooked Kingdom, where he aids the Crows in their effort against Jan Van Eck and confronts his son.

=== Jarl Brum ===
Jarl Brum is the captain of the drüskelle and a fierce anti-Grisha activist. He is prideful and obstinate, a trait that allows him to continue to rule over the drüskelle and gain continued influence over Fjerda even after the botched protection of the Ice Court.

== Introduced in the King of Scars duology ==
=== Hanne Brum ===
Hanne Brum is Jarl's child, a fierce and rebellious person who would rather fight or ride on horseback as a soldier than engage in feminine courtly activities. Hanne is secretly a Healer and has a blooming relationship with Nina. Hanne eventually fakes their death and is tailored to look like Fjerda's Prince Rasmus, becoming engaged to Nina sometime afterwards. Hanne is implied to be transgender, non-binary, or gender-non-conforming.

=== Isaak Andreyev ===
Isaak Andreyev is a Ravkan soldier who served under Nikolai during his tenure as King of Ravka. He is a close friend of Nikolai and disguises himself as the King with Genya's tailoring when Nikolai is away dealing with the Saints. He is killed by Shu Han's Mayu Kir-Kaat, who has disguised herself as Princess Ehri.

=== Mayu Kir-Kaat ===
Mayu Kir-Kaat is Princess Ehri's bodyguard and a soldier for Shu Han. She develops feelings for Isaak while he is disguised as Nikolai but kills him to fulfill her duty. She would later feel great remorse for what she did and rebel against Shu Han's Queen Makhi, freeing the khergud Grisha soldiers being fed jurda parem, including her twin brother Reyem. She later attends Zoya's coronation.

=== Sankt Juris of the Sword ===
Sankt Juris is a Grisha saint from the Wandering Isle who slew a dragon in his youth. He is revealed to still be alive trapped inside the Shadow Fold alongside Sankta Lizabeta and Sankt Grigori. He becomes Zoya's mentor and trains her to become a more powerful Grisha using the older and more proper ways of using the Small Science. He is a Squaller, a Tidemaker, an Inferni, and a Fabrikator. He is killed by Lizabeta, but continues to live on inside Zoya. He is based on Saint George.

=== Sankta Lizabeta of the Roses ===
Sankta Lizabeta is a Grisha saint and Fabrikator who possesses a swarm of bees as her amplifier. She is revealed to still be alive inside the Shadow Fold alongside Sankt Juris and Sankt Grigori. She tries to revive the Darkling believing he is the true king of Ravka, but is killed by Zoya.

=== Sankt Grigori of the Woods ===
Sankt Grigori is a Grisha saint and Healer who can transform into a bear. He is revealed to still be alive inside the Shadow Fold alongside Sankt Juris and Sankt Lizabeta. He cannot resume his original form and thus constantly switches from form to form, earning the name "Grotesque". He is later killed by Lizabeta when he attempts to stop her from reviving the Darkling.

== Minor characters ==
- Vasily Lantsov is Nikolai's maternal half-brother. He is the heir and only biological son of Alexander III, King of Ravka. He is described as having "eyes so heavy-lidded that it is hard to tell if he is bored or drunk." He is killed by nichevo'ya when the Little Palace is overwhelmed, after having inadvertently allowed the Darkling into Ravka. He is played by George Parker in the Netflix series.
- Dubrov and Mikhael are trackers in the First Army who were Mal's friends. They are killed by Fjerdans while helping Mal track down the white stag. Dubrov is played by Andy Burse and Mikhael by Angus Castle-Doughty in the show.
- Aditi Hilli is Jesper's mother and Colm's wife. A caring and altruistic woman with Grisha abilities, she saw her son as "zowa", or blessed. While helping a little girl, Leoni, she accidentally ingests poison herself and dies as a result. She is played by Rhoda Ofori-Attah in a flashback.
- Marya Hendriks is Wylan's mother and Jan's ex-wife. She is declared insane and sent to a mental institution, but Wylan later rescues her and they live together thereafter. Her memory does not serve her well and she fades in and out of clarity.
- Anika is a member of the Dregs' gang run by Per Haskell and is heavily loyal to the gang.
- Bo Yul-Bayur is a Shu chemist and a Grisha Fabrikator. The inventor of jurda parem, he is heavily sought after by countries around the world. He created parem as a way to hide his and his son Kuwei's powers from Shu Han, but inadvertently created a solution that would amplify Grisha powers. He is killed in the crossfire between Fjerdans and the Kerch in Ahmrat Jen.
- Dunyasha Lazareva is a Ravkan assassin trained at a monastery in Ahmrat Jen, Shu Han, who claims ancestry to the Lantsov bloodline. She is described as Inej's "shadow", a fierce and possibly insane killer. During the events of Crooked Kingdom, she is hired to kill Inej but fails - in fact, Inej ends up killing her.
- Specht is a member of the Dregs and a former member of the Kerch navy. He is described as having a "grizzled jaw and tattoos extending halfway up his neck." He is deeply loyal to Kaz, assisting the Crows to Fjerda for the Ice Court heist and taking on odd jobs during Crooked Kingdom for them.
- Rotty is a member of the Dregs often mentioned with Specht, also loyal to Kaz and the Crows. He is present at the parley between the Dregs and the Black Tips and accompanies them on the Ferolind.
- Jordan "Jordie" Rietveld is Kaz's older brother. Hoping to one day become a successful merchant, Jordie searched for jobs in Ketterdam's financial district and met Pekka (disguised as Jakob). The pair were led into a false business venture, forced into the streets, and caught the Ketterdam plague. He dies and Kaz uses his body to swim to the shoreline. He is played by Tommy Rodger in flashbacks.

== Introduced in the Shadow and Bone television adaptation ==
=== Season one ===
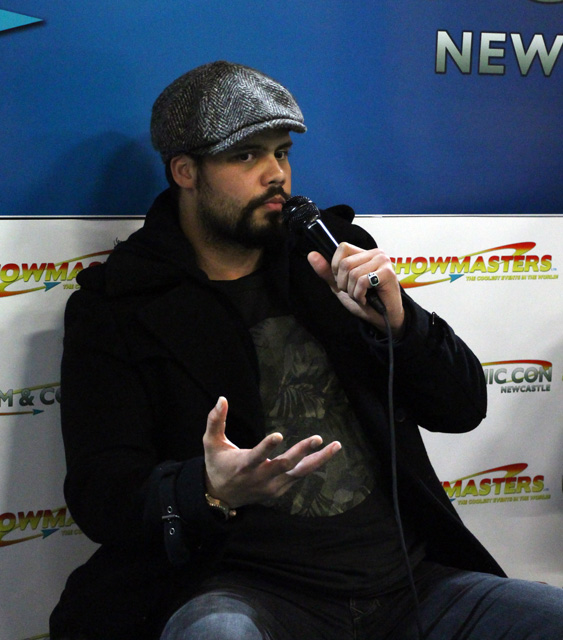
Howard Charles in 2016.

- Arken, also known as the Conductor, is an original character created for the show. He was a Kerch smuggler who illegally transported people and objects through the fold using a train that combats the effect of the darkness and keeps volcra away. Initially believing him to be a slaver, he becomes an ally to the Crows in their mission to infiltrate the Little Palace. He is heavily devout for the Ravkan war effort to split East and West Ravka, becoming close with their leader. He betrays the Crows and attempts to kill Alina, but kills a tailored Marie instead. He is tortured by the Darkling for information and seemingly killed afterwards. Howard Charles plays the character in five episodes.
- General Zlatan is an original character created for the Netflix series. He is a First Army general in West Ravka who supports its independence and seeks to lead an insurrection. He is friends with Arken and leader of an army of non-Grisha insurrectionists, but is killed alongside his army when the Darkling uses the power of the stag amplifier to decimate Novokribirsk. It is unknown whether any of his supporters survived. The character is played by Tom Weston-Jones in three episodes.
