= Skogman =

Skogman is a surname. Notable people with the surname include:

- Calahan Skogman (born 1993), American actor
- Frida Skogman, Swedish footballer
- Magna Lykseth-Skogman (1874–1949), Swedish opera singer
- Thore Skogman (1931–2007), Swedish singer, songwriter, actor and entertainer

== Other ==
- Skogman Lake, Lake in the state of Minnesota, United States
