= Frida Svensson =

Frida Svensson may refer to:

- Frida Svensson (athlete) (born 1970), Swedish track and field athlete
- Frida Svensson (rower) (born 1981), Swedish sculler
- Frida Svensson (footballer) (born 1989), Swedish football midfielder
