= Amita Suman =

British actress (born 1997)

- अमिता सुमन
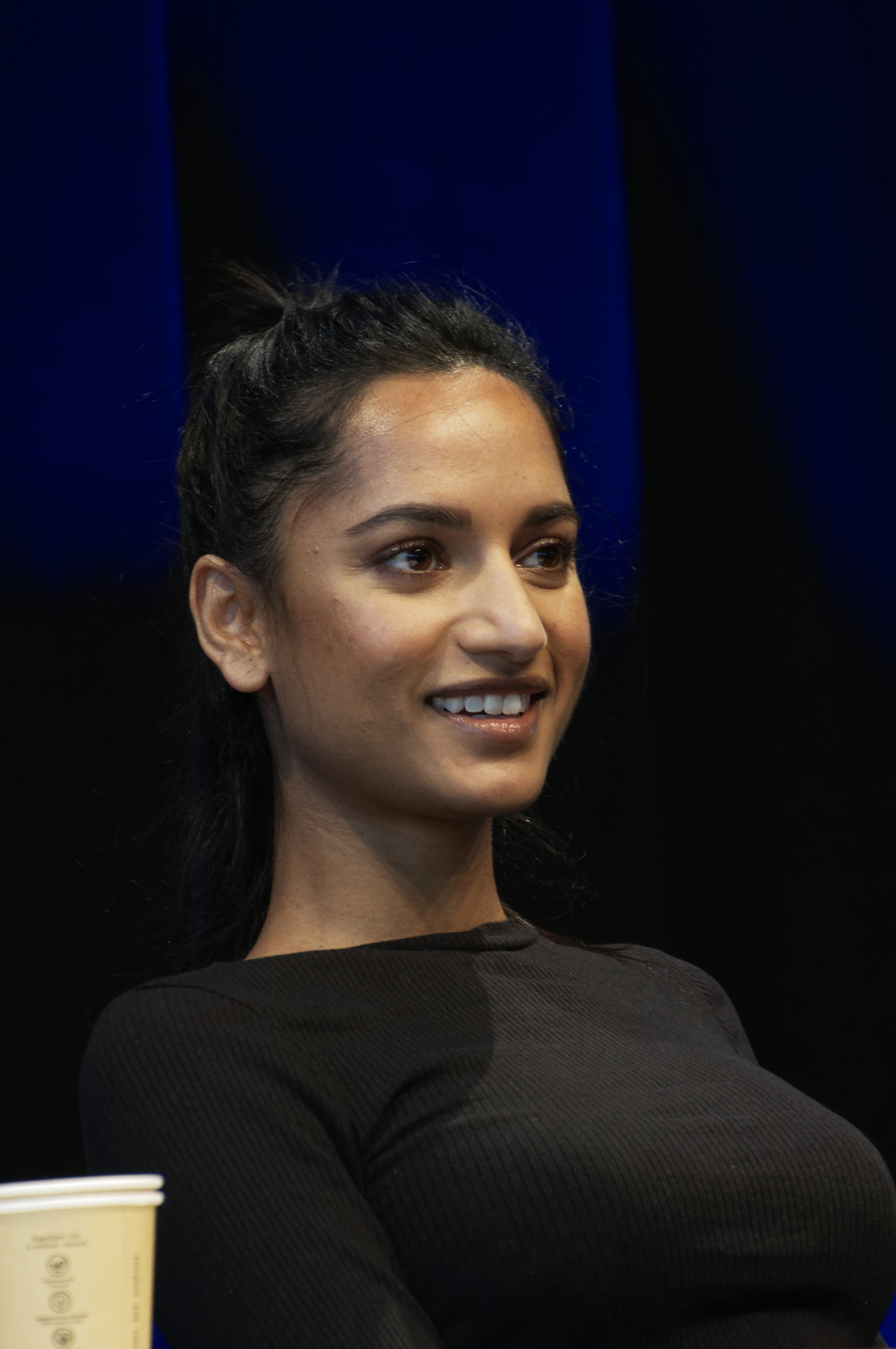
- Suman at the 2021 Comic-Con Germany
- Born: 19 July 1997 (age 29); Bhedihari, Nepal
- Education: Academy of Live and Recorded Arts
- Occupation: Actress
- Years active: 2018–present

Amita Suman (Nepali: अमिता सुमन, born 19 July 1997) is a British actress. On television, she is known for her roles as in the Netflix fantasy series Shadow and Bone (2021–2023) and the Paramount+ spinoff NCIS: Tony & Ziva (2025). She also had a recurring role in the CW series The Outpost (2019–2021).

== Early life ==
Suman was born in Bhedihari, Nepal to a Bhojpuri family. The family lived in a self-built clay house with modest infrastructure and grew their own food. Suman went to Saint Xavier School in Birgunj.

Upon her father remarrying a British woman, Suman moved to Brighton, England when she was seven. She attended Varndean Secondary School and Sussex Downs College (now East Sussex College Lewes) before going on to train at the Academy of Live and Recorded Arts, graduating in 2018.

== Career ==
Shortly after graduating, Suman made her television debut with minor roles in Casualty and Ackley Bridge. She had a major guest role in the Doctor Who series 11 episode "Demons of the Punjab" as a young version of companion Yasmin Khan's grandmother, Umbreen. Suman took over the recurring role of Naya from Medalion Rahimi in season 2 of the CW series The Outpost.

In October 2019, it was announced Suman would star as Inej Ghafa in the 2021 Netflix series Shadow and Bone, an adaptation of the fantasy book series The Grisha Trilogy and the Six of Crows Duology by Leigh Bardugo. The series was cancelled by Netflix after two successful seasons.

Suman has upcoming roles in the Paramount+ series NCIS: Tony & Ziva as Claudette and the Netflix political thriller Hostage.

== Filmography ==
Television and film roles
Year	Title	Role	Notes
2018	Casualty	Nina Biswas	2 Episodes
2018	Ackley Bridge	Sameera	1 Episode
2018	Doctor Who	Umbreen	Episode: "Demons of the Punjab"
2019	Daughter	Lilah	Short film
2019–2021	The Outpost	Naya	Recurring role; 14 Episodes
2021–2023	Shadow and Bone	Inej Ghafa	Main role; 16 Episodes
2022	The Sandman	Nora	Episode: "Dream of a Thousand Cats/Calliope"
2025	NCIS: Tony & Ziva	Claudette Caron	Main role; 10 Episodes
2025	Hostage	Dr. Maya Odari	3 episodes
TBA	She Creates Change	Diksha	Voice role; animated anthology
TBA	Helvellyn Edge	Alamo	Upcoming film
