= Jack Wolfe (actor) =

English actor

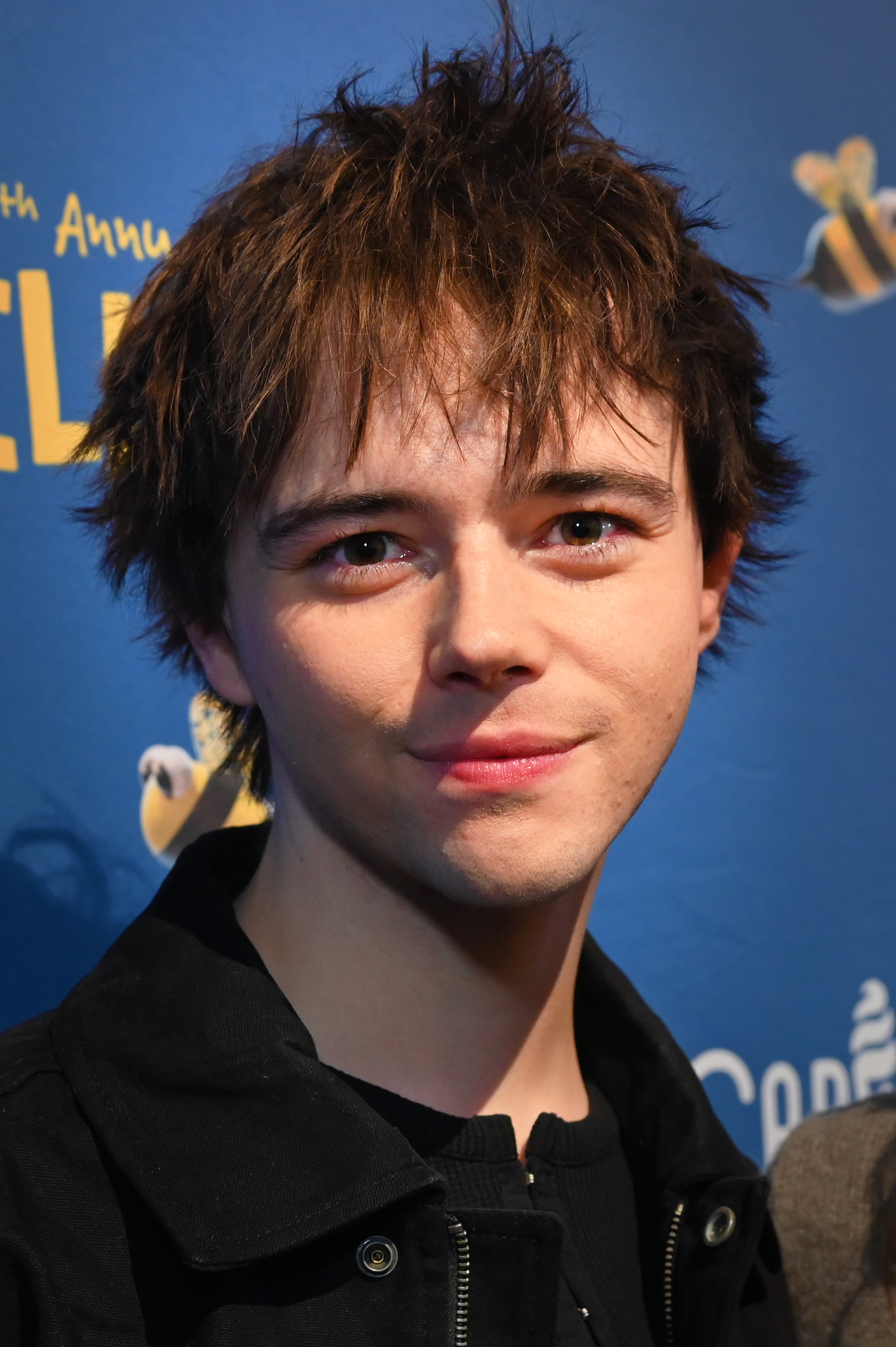
- Wolfe in 2025
- Born: Dewsbury, West Yorkshire, England
- Education: Mountview Academy of Theatre Arts
- Occupation: Actor
- Years active: 2017–present

Jack Wolfe is an English actor. For his theatre work, he has received a number of accolades, including a WhatsOnStage Award and a nomination for a Laurence Olivier Award for his performance in Next to Normal. On screen, he is known for his roles in the film The Magic Flute (2022) and the second season of the Netflix series Shadow and Bone (2023).

== Early life and education ==
Wolfe grew up between Wakefield, Yorkshire, and New Quay on the Welsh coast. Wolfe attended Ackworth School near Pontefract and joined a local Saturday youth theatre in Wakefield. He joined the National Youth Theatre at 14. Wolfe credits theatre with helping him out of his shell, saying "I was a very high strung, anxious child who didn't say very many words . . . Theatre was really my first outlet to, I guess, express myself, find my voice, make friends, find a community."

He went on to graduate from Mountview Academy of Theatre Arts in London in 2017. He also trained at Chetham's School of Music in Manchester.

== Career ==
=== Film and television ===
In 2018, Wolfe made his television debut on the fourth series of the British children's drama series Hetty Feather, based on the novel of the same name by Jacqueline Wilson, in which he played the role of Samuel Buscombe. In 2019, he appeared in episodic roles in the television shows Father Brown and The Witcher. In 2021, he featured in Inside No. 9 series 6, episode 6, "Last Night of the Proms", as Oliver.

Wolfe was cast to play the lead role of Tim Walker / Tamino in the 2022 German musical fantasy film The Magic Flute directed by Florian Sigl and written by Andrew Lowery, based on the 1791 opera of the same name by Wolfgang Amadeus Mozart.

In 2023, Wolfe joined the main cast of the fantasy series Shadow and Bone for its second season, portraying Wylan Hendricks.

In 2024, he appeared in Inside No. 9 series 9, episode 6, "Plodding On", as party guest.

In October 2025, Wolfe was announced as Tiny in David Turpin's film Ancestors, which filmed earlier that year and premiered at the Toronto International Film Festival on 12 September 2026.

In 2026, he was cast to play Ralph Touchett in the BBC's upcoming series adaptation of The Portrait of a Lady.

=== Theatre ===
In 2017, Wolfe played the lead role as Louis Braille in The Braille Legacy at the Charing Cross Theatre in Westminster, London. In the same year, Wolfe played Danny in Pinocchio at the National Theatre in London.

In 2019, Wolfe played Tobias Ragg in Sweeney Todd at Lyric Theatre in Belfast, Northern Ireland. In the same year, Wolfe played the Boy in The Musician at The Belfast Ensemble. From 2019 to 2020, Wolfe was cast as the lead role of Kai in The Snow Queen at Rose Theatre Kingston in Kingston upon Thames.

In 2021, Wolfe played the lead role of Peter Duchene in The Magician's Elephant, based on the 2009 children's novel of the same name by Kate DiCamillo.

In 2023, Wolfe played the role of Gabe Goodman in Next To Normal at the Donmar Warehouse. His performance earned him several awards and nominations, including a nomination for Best Actor in a Supporting Role in a Musical at the 2024 Laurence Olivier Awards.

In 2024, he joined the original West End cast of Spring Awakening, playing Moritz for a concert celebrating the fifteenth anniversary of the play's West End run. He reprised his role as Gabe Goodman in Next to Normal's West End transfer to Wyndham's Theatre. The production was filmed for Great Performances and aired in 2025.

In 2025, he originated the role of the Balladeer in the world premiere production of The Unlikely Pilgrimage of Harold Fry at Chichester Festival Theatre. He made his Broadway debut in September 2025 as Orpheus in Hadestown; he stepped down from the role in March 2026.

== Personal life ==
Wolfe identifies as queer.

== Filmography ==
=== Film ===
Year	Title	Role	Notes
2022	The Magic Flute	Tim Walker / Prince Tamino	
2025	Next to Normal	Gabe Goodman	West End pro-shot, aired as part of Great Performances
2026	Kiloran Bay	Torquil (young)	Short-film that premiered at the BFI Flare
2026	Ancestors	Tiny	Premiered at the Toronto International Film Festival

=== Television ===
Key
†	Denotes television productions that have not yet been released

Year	Title	Role	Notes
2018	Hetty Feather	Samuel Buscombe	5 episodes
2019	Father Brown	George Chase	Episode: "The House of God"
2019	The Witcher	Nadbor	Episode: "Much More"
2021–24	Inside No. 9	Oliver / Party Guest	Episodes: "Last Night of the Proms" (series 6) / "Plodding On" (series 9)
2023	Shadow and Bone	Wylan Hendriks	Main role (season 2)
TBA	The Portrait of a Lady †	Ralph Touchett	

== Stage ==
Year	Title	Role	Company	Notes
2017	The Braille Legacy	Louis Braille	Charing Cross Theatre	Lead
2017	Pinocchio	Danny Pinocchio (understudy)	National Theatre	
2019	Sweeney Todd	Tobias Ragg	Lyric Theatre Belfast	Musical
2019	The Musician	The Boy	The Belfast Ensemble	Opera
2019–2020	The Snow Queen	Kai	Rose Theatre Kingston	Lead
2021	The Magician's Elephant	Peter Duchene	Royal Shakespeare Company	Musical; lead
2023	Theatrical Consequences	Harry (assistant)	Savoy Theatre	Play
2023	Next to Normal	Gabe Goodman	Donmar Warehouse	Musical
2024	Spring Awakening in Concert	Moritz Stiefel	Victoria Palace Theatre	Musical
2024	Next to Normal	Gabe Goodman	Wyndham's Theatre	Musical
2024	Sondheim on Sondheim	Performer	Alexandra Palace Theatre	Revue
2025	The Unlikely Pilgrimage of Harold Fry	The Balladeer / David Fry	Chichester Festival Theatre	Musical
2025–2026	Hadestown	Orpheus	Walter Kerr Theatre	Musical; lead
2026	An Oak Tree	Guest Performer	The Other Palace	One Performance Only - October 31 (Matinee)

== Accolades ==
Year	Award	Category	Work	Result	Ref.
2023	BroadwayWorld UK / West End Awards	Best Supporting Performer in a New Production of a Musical	Next to Normal	Won	
2023	67th Evening Standard Theatre Awards	Emerging Talent	Next to Normal	Nominated	
2024	Critics Circle Theatre Awards	Most Promising Newcomer	Next to Normal	Won	
2024	Laurence Olivier Awards	Best Actor in a Supporting Role in a Musical	Next to Normal	Nominated	
2024	The Stage Debut Awards	Best West End Debut Performer	Next to Normal	Won	
2024	WhatsOnStage Awards	Best Supporting Performer in a Musical	Next to Normal	Won	
2026	iHeartRadio Music Awards	Favorite Broadway Debut	Hadestown	Nominated	
2026	Broadway.com Audience Choice Awards	Favorite Replacement (Male)	Hadestown	Won	
