= Shelley Meals =

American television writer and producer

- Occupation(s): Television producer, television writer
- Years active: 1996–present

Shelley Meals is an American television writer and producer. She is currently an executive producer on It: Welcome to Derry and NCIS: Tony & Ziva. She has also worked on Shadow & Bone, See, Sweet Magnolias, Chicago Med, Stitchers, Witches of East End, King & Maxwell, Rizzoli & Isles, Wild Card, Strong Medicine, Time of Your Life, Push, Dawson's Creek, Fame L.A., Dangerous Minds, and New York Undercover.

== Television credits ==
=== Writing ===
- It: Welcome to Derry
- NCIS: Tony & Ziva
- Shadow & Bone
- See
- Sweet Magnolias
- Chicago Med
- Stitchers
- Witches of East End
- King & Maxwell
- Rizzoli & Isles
- Sweet Magnolias
- HawthoRNe
- Strong Medicine
- Wild Card
- The Young and the Restless
- Time of Your Life
- Push
- Dawson's Creek
- Fame L.A.
- Dangerous Minds
- New York Undercover

=== Producing ===
- It: Welcome to Derry
- NCIS: Tony & Ziva
- Shadow and Bone
- See
- Sweet Magnolias
- Chicago Med
- Stitchers
- Witches of East End
- King & Maxwell
- HawthoRNe
- Sweet Magnolias
- Strong Medicine
- Time of Your Life
- Dawson's Creek
