= Sujaya Dasgupta =

British actress

- Born: 2 February 1988 (age 38); India
- Education: University of Leicester; Royal Central School of Speech and Drama
- Occupation: Actress
- Years active: 2015–present

Sujaya Dasgupta (born 2 February 1988) is a British actress. She is known for her roles in the Netflix series Shadow and Bone (2021–2023) and the Apple TV+ series Shantaram (2022).

== Early life ==
Dasgupta was born 2 February 1988 in India; for her father's work, she moved to England at the age of 3, where she grew up in Hertfordshire. She graduated with a Bachelor of Arts in English from the University of Leicester in 2009. She then trained in acting, going on to graduate from the Royal Central School of Speech and Drama in 2015.

== Career ==
Dasgupta appeared in the 2011 Barn Theatre productions of Lost and Private Fears in Public Places in Welwyn Garden City. She then made her London stage debut in as Hippolyta in A Midsummer Night's Dream at Theatro Technis in 2012.

Upon graduating from drama school, Dasgupta made her television debut as Priya Sutaria in a 2015 episode of the BBC medical drama Doctors. The following year, she had a recurring role as Veena Patel in the Freeform mystery series Guilt. She then went on the UK tour of Death of a Salesman in 2017, and had further television roles as Esme in the BBC One drama Press and Jamila Vani in four episodes of the soap opera Casualty in 2018.

In 2019, Dasgupta went on the UK tour of the stage adaptation of A Thousand Splendid Suns. That same year, she was cast as Zoya Nazyalensky in the Netflix fantasy series Shadow and Bone based on the Grishaverse novels by Leigh Bardugo, which premiered in 2021. She also made guest appearances in Michaela Coel's miniseries I May Destroy You (2020) and the third series of the sitcom Ghosts (2021).

In 2022, Dasgupta had a main role as Kavita in the Apple TV+ adaptation of Shantaram. She also starred in the play Silence, which ran at London's Donmar Warehouse and Tara Theatre.

== Filmography ==
Year	Title	Role	Notes
2014	Red Wolf	The Woman In Red / Narrator	Short film
2015	Doctors	Priya Sutaria	Episode: "Mother to Be"
2016	Guilt	Veena Patel	Recurring role; 7 episodes
2017	The Good Karma Hospital	Mrs. Menon	1 episode
2018	Press	Esme	4 episodes
2018	Casualty	Jamila Vani	4 episodes
2020	I May Destroy You	Mandeep	Episode: “The Alliance”
2021–2023	Shadow and Bone	Zoya Nazyalensky	Recurring role
2021	Ghosts	Zara	Episode: "The Bone Plot"
2022	Shantaram	Kavita	Main role
2023	Shadow and Bone	Zoya	Introduced in s1e1
