= Julian Kostov =

Bulgarian actor and filmmaker (born 1989)

- Юлиан Костов
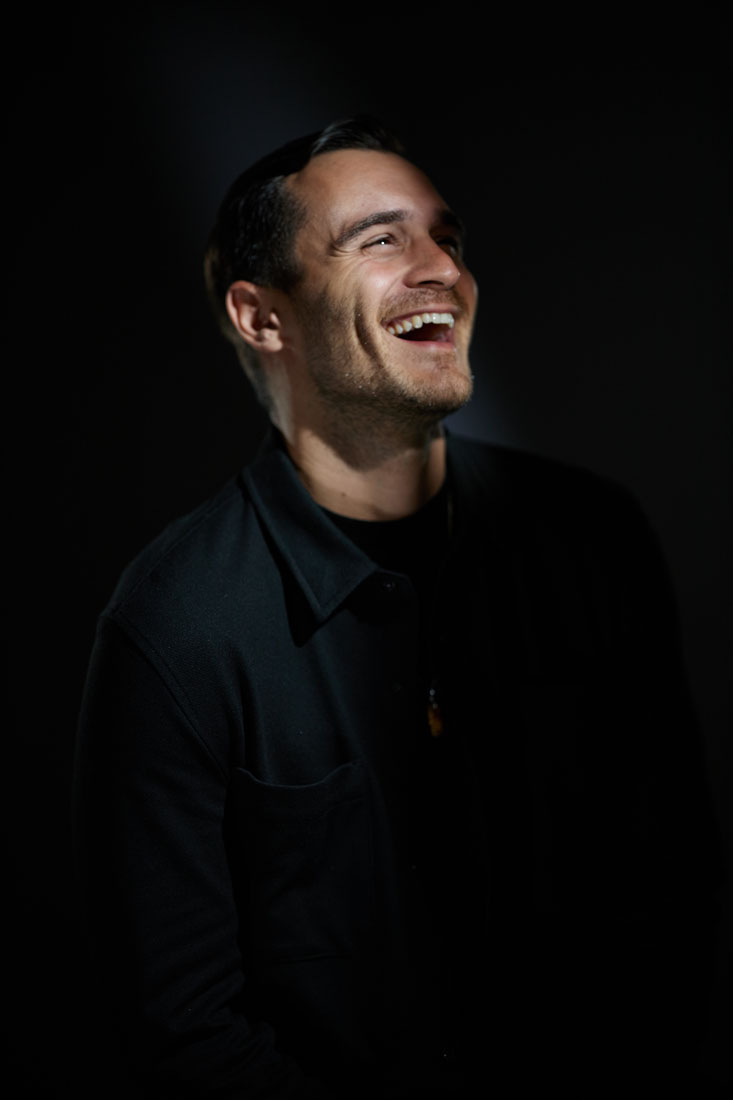
- Kostov in 2021
- Born: 25 August 1989 (age 37); Varna, Bulgaria
- Education: University of Wales Institute Cardiff (BA)
- Occupations: Actor; filmmaker
- Years active: 2010–present

Julian Kostov (born 25 August 1989) is a Bulgarian actor and filmmaker. In 2025, he starred as Marek in the West End production of Till the Stars Come Down at the Theatre Royal Haymarket, a transfer from the Royal National Theatre. He has been described as the first Bulgarian actor to perform in a West End production.

In 2026, he was nominated for a Screen Actors Guild Award for Outstanding Performance by an Ensemble in a Drama Series as part of the cast of the HBO series The White Lotus.

He gained international recognition for his roles in Shadow and Bone (2021) and as the antagonist Vladimir Makarov in Call of Duty: Modern Warfare III (2023).

His film career includes starring roles in the action-comedy Fight or Flight (2025) alongside Josh Hartnett, the anti-superhero comedy The Toxic Avenger (2023), and the war dramas The Last Front (2024) and Another Mother's Son (2017). He is slated to appear in the upcoming Netflix feature The Boy in the Iron Box, produced by Guillermo del Toro.

Beyond his acting career, Kostov is the founder of JupiterLights Media and co-founder of Five Oceans alongside Academy Award-nominee Maria Bakalova, with multiple award-winning projects as a producer and director, including Triumph, Bulgaria's official submission for the 97th Academy Awards.

Kostov has spoken about the need for greater representation of Slavic and Balkan actors and the normalization of foreign accents on screen.

== Early life and education ==
Julian Kostov was born on 25 August 1989 in Varna, Bulgaria. At the age of 12, Kostov became a pentathlon champion for his age group. He was a 10-time National Swimming Champion from 2005 to 2009. In 2008, he earned the Master of Sport title in Swimming. Kostov holds over 60 medals as a professional swimmer, including a bronze medal at the 2007 Balkan Games. He attended the Spanish-language Frederic Joliot-Curie School in Varna, before entering post-secondary studies at Tilburg University, where he majored in international business.

After two years in the Netherlands, Kostov decided to move to the United Kingdom and pursue a career in acting, inspired by Heath Ledger's performance in The Dark Knight. He transferred to Cardiff Metropolitan University to finish his studies, graduating with a bachelor's degree in Business Studies in 2011. He was admitted to the National Youth Theatre that same year. Kostov began auditioning for agents, eventually signing with one. He later switched to a different agent and landed a Gillette commercial. During that period, he also took classes at Anthony Meindl's Actor Workshop in London.

== Career ==
=== Early career and critical breakthrough (2014–2020) ===
Kostov began his acting career with a guest role on 24: Live Another Day in 2014, followed by appearances in Ben-Hur and London Has Fallen. In 2017, Kostov portrayed the historic figure Feodor "Bill" Burriy in the World War II drama Another Mother's Son, receiving positive reviews for his performance. Critics highlighted his "brooding, internalised quality," with HeyUGuys observing that he bore an "uncanny resemblance to a young Robert De Niro" in the film.

That same year, he appeared in the horror film Leatherface, playing Ted Hardesty, the father of the original franchise's protagonists. Between 2018 and 2020, he held recurring television roles in A Discovery of Witches, Berlin Station, and Treadstone.

=== Breakthrough and international recognition (2021–present) ===
In 2021, Kostov gained international recognition as Fedyor Kaminsky in the Netflix series Shadow and Bone In 2023, he portrayed the antagonist Vladimir Makarov in Call of Duty: Modern Warfare III.

In 2024, Kostov provided the voice for Aleksei in James Gunn's DC Universe reboot series Creature Commandos. The same year, he produced and starred in Triumph, which premiered in the Platform competition at the Toronto International Film Festival and was selected as the Bulgarian entry for the Academy Award for Best International Feature Film at the 97th Academy Awards.

In 2025, Kostov appeared in several major productions. He starred as Aleksei in the third season of the HBO series The White Lotus, earning a Screen Actors Guild Award nomination in 2026. Kostov appeared as Budd Berserk opposite Elijah Wood and Peter Dinklage in the superhero splatter film The Toxic Avenger, which received a wide release in 2025.

In the same year, Kostov also starred alongside Josh Hartnett and veteran co-star Katee Sackhoff in the action-comedy Fight or Flight. His portrayal of the caustic operative Aaron Hunter was highlighted as a comedic standout, with Screen Rant observing that both actors "chew the scenery with aplomb."

Kostov is slated to appear in the upcoming Netflix feature The Boy in the Iron Box, produced by Academy Award-winner Guillermo del Toro.

=== Stage and West End debut ===
In 2025, he became the first Bulgarian actor to perform in a West End production, starring as Marek in the National Theatre's transfer of Till the Stars Come Down at the Theatre Royal Haymarket.

His portrayal of the Polish groom Marek received widespread critical acclaim from major UK publications. Clive Davis of The Times noted that his presence elicited visceral "gasps from the audience" during the play's climax. The Stage praised his "energizing" performance, describing the character as "by turns charming, impulsive, and prickly," while Time Out London called him a "bright light" who played the role with "gusto."

The Evening Standard noted that Kostov "impressed," bringing "range and passion, as well as an excellent comic touch" to the role. The Sunday Express further described his performance as a "stand out delight," and theatre publication All That Dazzles called him "charming and charismatic," adding it was a performance "impossible not to fall in love with."

== Other endeavours ==
In 2014, Kostov founded JupiterLights Media (formerly JupiterLights Productions), a UK-based production company. The company produced the horror-thriller film The Dare (2019). JupiterLights is also credited with managing the early international career of Academy Award-nominee Maria Bakalova.

Alongside Bakalova, Kostov co-founded the production company Five Oceans, which focuses on bringing Balkan and Eastern European stories to a global audience. Through Five Oceans, he co-produced the satirical drama Triumph (2024), in which he also starred.

== Acting credits ==
=== Film ===
Key
†	Denotes films that have not yet been released

Year	Title	Role	Notes
2013	Code Red	Harold Miller	
2014	Rapid Response Corps 2: Nuclear Threat	Damon Johnson	
2015	Early Birds	Jack	Short film
2015	Colour Me Grey	Nikolai	Short film
2016	London Has Fallen	Aide	
2016	Ben-Hur	Wounded Soldier	
2016	The Quickening	Mike	Short film
2016	Bar Tricks	Derek	
2017	Another Mother's Son	Feodor "Bill" Burriy	
2017	The Naughty List	Voiceover	Short film
2017	Leatherface	Ted Hardesty	
2018	The Conversation	Sam Quentin	Short film
2018	Risk	Daniel the Host	Short film
2019	Going Country	Matey	Short film
2020	Search and Destroy	Marcus Cooper	
2023	The Toxic Avenger	Budd Berserk	
2024	The Last Front	Thomas Bosmans	
2024	Triumph	Private Georgi	Also producer
2025	Fight or Flight	Aaron Hunter	
TBA	The Boy in the Iron Box †		Post-production

=== Television ===
Year	Title	Role	Notes
2014	24: Live Another Day	Agent Harwell	2 episodes
2014	Crystal Skulls	Hadden Security	TV film
2016	Barbarians Rising	Marcus	2 episodes
2018	A Discovery of Witches	Timur	Recurring role (season 1)
2018–2019	Berlin Station	Sergei Basarov	Recurring role (season 3)
2019	Flack	Juan	Episode: "Patrick"
2019	Wild Bill	Marek Rudnicka	Episode: "Welcome to Boston"
2019	Treadstone	Yuri Leniov (1973)	2 episodes
2020	Back	Luca	2 episodes
2021	Shadow and Bone	Fedyor Kaminsky	Recurring role (season 1)
2021	Temple	Max	2 episodes
2024	Alex Rider	Oleg	2 episodes
2024	Creature Commandos	Alexei, Sergei, additional voices	3 episodes
2025	The White Lotus	Aleksei	Season 3

=== Video games ===
Year	Title	Role	Notes
2016	Tom Clancy's The Division	Narrator, JTF Officer, Thug	
2017	The Lego Ninjago Movie Video Game	Lloyd Garmadon	
2017	Lego Marvel Super Heroes 2	Hulkling	
2017	Xenoblade Chronicles 2	Godfrey	English version
2018	Bravo Team	Mordean soldier	
2018	A Way Out	Additional voices	
2018	Overkill's The Walking Dead	The Family	
2019	Crossfire HD/CrossfireX	Alexander Steiner	Story mode
2023	Call of Duty: Modern Warfare III	Vladimir Makarov	Story mode
2026	Call of Duty: Modern Warfare 4	Vladimir Makarov	

=== Stage ===
Year	Title	Role	Venue	Notes
2010	Stadium Arts	Actor	National Youth Theatre	
2016	The Millennials	Paul	Black Cat Theatre	
2017	The Ballerina	Colin Clutterbuck	The Landor	
2025	Till the Stars Come Down	Marek	Theatre Royal Haymarket	West End debut; transfer from the Royal National Theatre

=== Filmmaking credits ===
- Early Birds (2015) – writer, producer
- The Dare (2019) – producer, second unit director
- What Stays After (2024) – producer
- You Don't Exist (2024) – producer
- Triumph (2025) – producer, actor
- The Day She Will Be Born (2025) – producer, actor
- Shattered Bonds (2025) – executive producer, actor
- Red Market (2024) – director, writer

== Music ==
Kostov has also released music as a recording artist, with singles including "Rain", "Home (My Gaia)", "Groundhog Day", and "420".

Title	Year	Notes
"Rain"	2024	feat. Maria Dragneva
"Home (My Gaia)"	2024	
"Groundhog Day"	2024	
"Addicted"	2025	with Pavell
"420"	2025	
"Pool Boy"	2025	
"Твоето тяло"	2026	with Mirela Ilieva

== Soundtrack ==
Title	Year	Notes
"(We Are) Crazy and Dangerous"	2023	Performed as Budd Berserk in The Toxic Avenger; credited to The Killer Nutz
"My Baby Is an Axe"	2023	Performed as Budd Berserk in The Toxic Avenger
"Groundhog Day"	2024	Featured in the short film Red Market
