= Till the Stars Come Down =

2024 romantic drama play by Beth Steel

- West End promotional poster
- Written by: Beth Steel
- Genre: Romantic Drama

Premiere
- Date: 24 January 2024
- Place: National Theatre, London
- Directed by: Bijan Sheibani

Till the Stars Come Down is a romantic drama play by Beth Steel. It originally premiered at London's National Theatre in 2024. It subsequently transferred to the Theatre Royal Haymarket in London's West End in 2025. The production was nominated for two 2024 Laurence Olivier Awards, including Best New Play.

== Synopsis ==
Unfolding over one scorching summer day during the wedding of Sylvia and Marek, a Polish immigrant. Set in a former East Midlands mining town, the play follows Sylvia's working-class family as passions ignite and long-held secrets surface, testing loyalties and forcing characters to confront a future full of uncertainty. The play blends humor and tragedy, exploring complex family dynamics, love, loss, and the scars left by political and economic history.

== Production History ==
=== London (2024) ===
The play made its world premiere on 24 January 2024 at the Dorfman Theatre at the National Theatre. The production was directed by Bijan Sheibani. The production closed on 16 March 2024.

=== West End (2025) ===
The production transferred to the Theatre Royal Haymarket in London's West End in the summer of 2025. Most of the National Theatre cast reprised their roles. The production officially began performances from 1 July 2025 and ran through 27 September 2025.

== Cast and characters ==
Character	London	West End
Character	2024	2025
Sylvia	Sinéad Matthews	Sinéad Matthews
Aunty Carol	Lorraine Ashbourne	Dorothy Atkinson
Hazel	Lucy Black	Lucy Black
Maggie	Lisa McGrillis	Aisling Loftus
Sarah	Bodhi Rae Breathnach	Lillie Babb
Sarah	Maggie Livermore	Elodie Blomfield
Sarah	Cadence Williams	Cadence Williams
John	Derek Riddell	Adrian Bower
Leanne	Ruby Stokes	Ruby Thompson
Uncle Pete	Philip Whitchurch	Philip Whitchurch
Tony	Alan Williams	Alan Williams
Marek	Marc Wootton	Julian Kostov

== Awards and nominations ==
Year	Award	Category	Nominee	Result
2024	Laurence Olivier Awards	Best New Play		Nominated
2024	Laurence Olivier Awards	Best Actress in a Supporting Role	Lorraine Ashbourne	Nominated
