= Shadow and Bone (TV series) =

2021 American fantasy television series

- Genre: Fantasy; Drama; Mystery
- Based on: Shadow and Bone and Six of Crows by Leigh Bardugo
- Developed by: Eric Heisserer
- Starring: Jessie Mei Li; Archie Renaux; Freddy Carter; Amita Suman; Kit Young; Ben Barnes; Zoë Wanamaker; Patrick Gibson; Daisy Head; Danielle Galligan; Calahan Skogman; Lewis Tan; Jack Wolfe; Anna Leong Brophy
- Music by: Joseph Trapanese
- Country of origin: United States
- Original language: English
- No. of seasons: 2
- No. of episodes: 16

Production
- Executive producers: Lee Toland Krieger; Leigh Bardugo; Pouya Shahbazian; Josh Barry; Dan Cohen; Shawn Levy; Shelley Meals; Dan Levine; Daegan Fryklind; Eric Heisserer
- Producers: Christina Strain; Thane Watkins; Rand Geiger; Vanya Asher; Craig Forrest; Becca Edelman
- Production locations: Budapest, Hungary; Vancouver, British Columbia, Canada
- Cinematography: David Lanzenberg; Owen McPolin; Aaron Morton; Petra Korner; David Higgs
- Editors: Tyler Nelson; David Trachtenberg; Niven Howie; Lisa Bromwell; Paul E. Alderman; Franzis Muller; Chester Howie
- Running time: 45–64 minutes
- Production companies: 21 Laps Entertainment; Chronology; Loom Studios

Original release
- Network: Netflix
- Release: April 23, 2021 – March 16, 2023

Shadow and Bone is an American fantasy television series developed by Eric Heisserer for Netflix, starring Jessie Mei Li, Ben Barnes and Archie Renaux, with Freddy Carter, Amita Suman, and Kit Young in supporting roles. Based on the works of Leigh Bardugo, the series takes place in the Grishaverse fantasy setting and follows Alina Starkov (Li), an orphan and cartographer who discovers she is a Grisha, someone with magical abilities, and the key to saving her war-torn world.

The first season, which adapts Bardugo's novel Shadow and Bone (2012), premiered on April 23, 2021, and also features an original storyline involving the Crows, a criminal gang from Bardugo's Six of Crows duology.

Shadow and Bone received generally positive reviews, with praise for its world-building and cast, but some criticism aimed at its pacing. Following its success, Netflix renewed the show for a second season, which premiered on March 16, 2023, and adapted Siege and Storm (2013), Ruin and Rising (2014), and parts of Crooked Kingdom (2016). Despite growing fan support, Shadow and Bone was canceled after two seasons in November 2023.

== Premise and world ==
The series is set in the Grishaverse, which comprises the nations of Ravka, Fjerda, Shu Han, Kerch, Novyi Zem, and the Wandering Isle. Each nation draws inspiration from real-world countries, reflecting elements of language, culture, and tradition from different historical periods. In the Grishaverse, there exists a group of individuals referred to as "magic-users". These people, known as Grisha, are practitioners of what is called "The Small Science", a unique ability that allows each Grisha to manipulate matter at the molecular level.

Ravka is home to most of the Grisha, where they are typically discovered as children by traveling Grisha testers and brought to train in the nation's Second Army. Ravka is one of the few places where Grisha can live without fear of persecution. During their training for the Second Army, Grisha are divided into three orders based on their gift in The Small Science:

- Etherealki: Summoners who control natural elements such as wind, water, and fire;
- Materialki: Fabricators who manipulate materials like metal and glass;
- Corporalki: Healers and Heartrenders who can manipulate the human body.

The nation of Ravka is geographically divided into two regions, from east to west, by the Shadow Fold (commonly referred to as "The Fold"), a vast area of impenetrable darkness inhabited by terrifying creatures, created centuries earlier by a Grisha known as the Black Heretic. Ravka is embroiled in a war with the northern nation of Fjerda, while its western half seeks independence. General Kirigan, also known as The Darkling, leads Ravka's Second Army and is determined to find the Sun Summoner, the only person capable of destroying the Fold and potentially reuniting Ravka.

In the series' first episode, Alina Starkov, a cartographer in Ravka's First Army, is revealed to be the long-prophesied Sun Summoner, which sets off a chain of events that affect the entire Grishaverse. As Alina begins to come to terms with her newfound identity, she becomes the target of multiple factions. Kaz Brekker, the leader of the criminal gang known as the Crows in Ketterdam, is hired to capture her, while Fjerdan witch hunters—dedicated to eliminating Grisha—seek to kill her. Alina must navigate a world of shifting allegiances and hidden threats as she struggles to harness her powers and save Ravka.

== Cast and characters ==
=== Main ===
- Jessie Mei Li as Alina Starkov, an orphan and former assistant cartographer of the Royal Corps of Surveyors in the First Army. She discovers that she is the Sun Summoner, a Grisha with the rare ability to summon light. Alina was reimagined as half-Shu (having had one parent from Shu-Han) in the series.
  - Kaylan Teague as Young Alina (recurring season 1)
- Archie Renaux as Malyen "Mal" Oretsev, an orphan tracker in the First Army and Alina's childhood best friend and love interest.
  - Cody Molko as Young Mal (recurring season 1)
- Freddy Carter as Kaz Brekker, leader of the Crows, known as Dirtyhands and the Bastard of the Barrel.
  - Fflyn Edwards as Young Kaz (recurring season 2)
- Amita Suman as Inej Ghafa, a Suli former indentured prostitute. She is a member of the Crows and is known as the Wraith.
- Kit Young as Jesper Fahey, member of the Crows who is a skilled Zemeni sharpshooter.
- Ben Barnes as General Aleksander Kirigan, the Shadow Summoner and The Black Heretic.
- Zoë Wanamaker as Baghra, Alina's Grisha teacher and Aleksander's mother.
- Patrick Gibson as Sturmhond / Nikolai Lantsov (season 2), a privateer who is later revealed to be the second Prince of Ravka.
- Daisy Head as Genya Safin (season 2; recurring season 1), A Grisha Healer and Tailor, who befriends Alina. She falls in love with David Kostyk.
- Danielle Galligan as Nina Zenik (season 2; recurring season 1), a Heartrender and Grisha Tailor, who is taken captive by Fjerdans. She later falls in love with her captor Matthias Helvar and becomes a member of the Crows.
- Calahan Skogman as Matthias Helvar (season 2; recurring season 1), a Fjerdan Drüskelle (witch-hunter), who takes part in Nina's capture but later falls in love with her.
- Lewis Tan as Tolya Yul-Bataar (season 2) a Shu Heartrender loyal to Nikolai and Alina. Tamar's brother.
- Jack Wolfe as Wylan Hendricks (season 2), an alchemist who reluctantly becomes the Crows' demolitions expert. Jesper's love interest.
- Anna Leong Brophy as Tamar Kir-Bataar, (season 2) a Shu Heartrender loyal to Nikolai and Alina. Tolya's sister.

=== Recurring ===
- Andy Burse as Dubrov (season 1), a tracker in the First Army and Mal's friend.
- Tom Weston-Jones as General Zlatan (season 1), a general of the First Army.
- Sujaya Dasgupta as Zoya, a Squaller (wind Summoner), who serves under Gen. Kirigan as his favourite and who is jealous of Alina but later becomes a valued ally.
- Elizabeth Rider as Ana Kuya (season 1).
- Hugo Speer as Lieutenant Bohdan (season 1; guest season 2).
- Angus Castle-Doughty as Mikhael (season 1), a tracker in the First Army and Mal's friend.
- Simon Sears as Ivan (season 1), a Heartrender, who serves under Gen. Kirigan. Feydor's lover.
- Howard Charles as Arken (season 1), the Conductor, who smuggles people across the Fold.
- Julian Kostov as Fedyor (season 1), a Heartrender, who serves under Gen. Kirigan. Ivan's lover.
- Jasmine Blackborow as Marie (season 1), an Inferni (fire Summoner), who befriends Alina.
- Gabrielle Brooks (season 1) and Joanna McGibbon (season 2) as Nadia, a Squaller, who also befriends Alina. Tamar's love interest.
- Luke Pasqualino as David Kostyk. As a Durast, he crafts weapons and other gadgets for the Grisha. Genya's love interest.
- Gareth Turkington as Feliks (season 1).
- Dean Lennox Kelly as Pekka Rollins (season 2; guest season 1), the ruthless leader of the Dime Lions gang in Ketterdam and Kaz's foe.
- Tommy Rodger as Jordie (season 2), Kaz' older brother.
- Iliasz Shweirif as Doughty (season 2).
- Shobhit Piasa as Vladim (season 2).
- Thue Ersted Rasmussen as Ahlgren (season 2).
- Rachel Redford as Fruszi (season 2).
- Keir Charles as Colonel Raevsky (season 2).
- Alistair Nwachukwu as Adrik (season 2), Nadia's brother.

=== Guest ===
- David Wurawa as Edyck.
- Kevin Eldon as The Apparat, the spiritual advisor to the King of Ravka.
- David Verrey as King Pyotr.
- Georgia Reece as Queen Tatiana.
- James Jaysen Bryhan as The Archivist, a magical character, part of the archives.

== Episodes ==
Season	Episodes	Originally released
1	8	April 23, 2021
2	8	March 16, 2023

=== Season 1 (2021) ===
No. overall	No. in season	Title	Directed by	Teleplay by	Original release date
1	1	"A Searing Burst of Light"	Lee Toland Krieger	Eric Heisserer	April 23, 2021
In East Ravka, Alina Starkov is a cartographer who is reunited with her childhood friend Malyen "Mal" Oretsev. Mal is chosen to be a part of the team which will cross the Fold, an extremely dangerous journey as the Fold is swarming with flying monsters named Volcra. Unwilling to be separated from Mal again, Alina burns the maps so the cartographers have to cross as well. The team enters the Fold just as General Kirigan, leader of the Second Army and the Shadow Summoner, arrives at the camp. Shortly after entering the Fold, they are attacked by Volcra. Alexei, another cartographer, escapes. Alina discovers her Sun Summoner abilities by unintentionally letting off a burst of light to fight off the Volcra. In Ketterdam, Kaz Brekker, Inej Ghafa, and Jesper Fahey compete with mob-boss Pekka Rollins for a job that pays one million kruge. When it is discovered that Dreesen first needs a Heartrender, Kaz beats Pekka to the only known one. Dreesen reveals to Kaz that he has captured Alexei. The Heartrender gets Alexei to reveal that Alina is a Sun Summoner, and Dreesen reveals that kidnapping Alina is the job.
2	2	"We're All Someone's Monster"	Lee Toland Krieger	Eric Heisserer	April 23, 2021
In East Ravka, Alina is taken to Kirigan, who proves she is a Sun Summoner and orders she be taken to the Little Palace. On her way, her convoy is ambushed by Fjerdan drüskelle (Grisha-hunters). Several Grisha are killed, but Kirigan rescues her and escorts her to the Little Palace himself. Alina, angry that she will now be hunted for the rest of her life, tells Kirigan she wishes she could give her power to someone who wants it. In Ketterdam, Kaz is threatened by Pekka to give him the job, but Kaz refuses. Inej is summoned by Tante Heleen, who runs the brothel Inej was sold to until Kaz bought her contract. He still owes Heleen some money for Inej, but Heleen promises to give Inej her freedom if she kills Arken, a human trafficker who has been selling to rival brothels. Kaz discovers that a man called the Conductor is ferrying people across the Fold, then discovers that Arken is the Conductor and Heleen wants him dead. Kaz stops Inej from killing Arken, then gives Heleen his club as an acceptable collateral and promises to pay off his debt for Inej once he completes the job.
3	3	"The Making at the Heart of the World"	Dan Liu	Daegan Fryklind	April 23, 2021
At the Little Palace, Alina meets with a Tailor, Genya Safin, and they prepare for her meeting with King Pytor and the court. At court, Alina astonishes all with her abilities, which are amplified by Kirigan's touch. The King gives permission for Alina to be trained, but insists that it be done quickly, as West Ravka is increasingly rallying for independence. After befriending two Grisha, Alina spars with Zoya Nazyalensky, who is jealous of the attention Alina is getting (especially from Kirigan). In the library, Alina meets the Apparat, who tells her about the stag Alina has been dreaming of, and about amplifiers; animals Grisha have killed in order to increase their own power. Alina then meets Baghra, a Grisha trainer who is unimpressed with Alina's abilities. She tells Alina to return when she believes in herself. Meanwhile Kaz, Jesper, Inej, and Arken are forced to travel to the Little Palace without Nina Zenik, a Heartrender who agreed to smuggle them in, as she has been captured by drüskelle. Four pounds short of the needed coal, they dare to make the train voyage through the Fold. They are attacked by Volcra, but Jesper uses his marksmanship abilities to get them safely through. On a ship, Nina is chained by the drüskelle who captured her and told she will be tried for witchcraft in Fjerda.
4	4	"Otkazat'sya"	Dan Liu	Vanya Asher	April 23, 2021
Alina goes riding with Kirigan, who decides the two are on a first-name basis and asks she call him Aleksander. He talks about how he felt like an outsider as a child due to being a descendant of the Black Heretic (the Grisha who created the Fold), and Alina realizes how much he needs her. Baghra shows Alina that she is holding back for Mal, but needs to focus on herself if she wants to master her powers. Alina grows disheartened that Mal has not yet replied to her letters and after another encounter with Kirigan, finally puts herself and the Grisha first and makes true progress with her power. Meanwhile, Mal has volunteered for a mission to find the stag that Alina has been dreaming of; the legendary Morozova's Stag is rumored to be the most powerful Grisha amplifier in the world, powerful enough to make Alina able to destroy the Fold. The reward for finding the Stag is a visit to the Little Palace. His team are ambushed by Fjerdans, and Mal alone survives. He then sees the Stag, and vows to reunite with Alina. The Crows and Arken steal the blueprints for the Little Palace, and join a troupe of traveling performers who will be performing in the Little Palace for the Winter Fete. The ship carrying Nina hits a bad storm. Kirigan sends Fedyor to find Nina, who has not checked in recently.
5	5	"Show Me Who You Are"	Mairzee Almas	M. Scott Veach & Nick Culbertson	April 23, 2021
The Little Palace plans to show off Alina as the Sun Summoner at the Winter Fete. Kaz, Inej, Jesper, and Arken infiltrate the Palace to kidnap Alina. Mal, injured by Fjerdans, makes his way to a First Army camp and says he's found the Stag. Along with a First Army general, he travels to the Little Palace to tell Kirigan directly. The palace guard is initially reluctant to let Mal in, believing the Stag to be a myth, but gives in and escorts Mal to Kirigan's room. Kirigan asks Mal to show him exactly where he found the Stag. Mal, however, refuses, demanding to see Alina first. Kirigan is angry but eventually agrees to allow the two to meet later. Baghra sends a guard to bring Mal to her hut, whereupon the guard tries to kill Mal so he can't tell Kirigan where the Stag is. Kirigan and Alina kiss after the event but are interrupted when Arken attacks a decoy, believing it to be Alina. Baghra tells Alina that Kirigan doesn't want to destroy the Fold, but use it as a weapon and that Alina needs to flee the Little Palace. Alina attempts this by climbing into the Crows' carriage. Mal escapes the palace and flees to the woods. Baghra is revealed to be Kirigan's mother and doesn't want him to find the Stag.
6	6	"The Heart Is an Arrow"	Mairzee Almas	Shelley Meals	April 23, 2021
Arken is captured and interrogated after the attempt to kidnap Alina backfires, and he is killed by Kirigan. Alina climbs from the carriage but the Crows are unable to catch her; she blinds Kaz and Jesper with her light, and Inej deliberately lets her go, believing her to be a living Saint. Alina is recognised as Shu (that is, descended from the people of Shu-Han) by some townsfolk and is chased into a forest, where she reunites with Mal and they both catch up. After learning about the Stag from Mal, Alina realizes she must get to it before Kirigan, so she and Mal make their way north. The drüskelle ship sinks during a storm, and Nina is forced to work with one of the drüskelle, Matthias, in order to survive. As they travel together, they begin to bond.
7	7	"The Unsea"	Jeremy Webb	Christina Strain	April 23, 2021
Alina and Mal find the Stag. Instead of killing it, Alina shares a moment with the Stag and plans to let it go until Kirigan shows up and kills it himself. He injures Mal and orders David to graft parts of the Stag's antlers to Alina's clavicle, as well as a piece to his own hand. Kirigan shows Alina that he can now control her power and will take her to the Fold. He tells her he will heal Mal if she complies. At the campsite near the Fold, Genya reunites with Alina to get her ready for an event Kirigan is holding; he is going to take some nobles across the Fold and show them his and Alina's newfound power. Alina realises that Genya was intercepting her and Mal's letters. Kaz, Inej and Jesper find a way of getting back through the Fold, after the train they took with Arken was blown up.
8	8	"No Mourners"	Jeremy Webb	Eric Heisserer & Daegan Fryklind	April 23, 2021
Nina and Matthias safely reach a city but are confronted by Fedyor. To save his life, Nina declares Matthias a slave trader so that he is arrested instead of being captured by Fedyor. Awakening imprisoned, Matthias wrongly believes Nina manipulated and betrayed him. As the ship crossing the Fold starts its journey, Alina uses her powers to shield it with a tunnel of light, protecting the passengers from the Volcra. However, when the ship reaches the other side, Kirigan expands the Fold toward West Ravka, overwhelming it and destroying a growing rebellion there. In the lower decks, Kaz and the others find Mal has snuck on board, and they hatch a plan, but Mal moves against Kirigan and is held at gunpoint, prompting the Crows to advance. Zoya, witnessing what Kirigan had done to West Ravka, turns against Kirigan and starts steering the ship across the Fold. Alina breaks free of Kirigan's control by cutting the antler from his hand and with help from the Crows, defeats Kirigan's forces. Mal battles Kirigan, but Kirigan is suddenly dragged away by Volcra. Zoya, Alina and Mal, along with the Crows, leave the Fold, being the only survivors, and decide to go their separate ways. Kaz's gang meets Nina at the skiff headed back to Ketterdam. Alina goes with Mal on the skiff, as well, to continue learning how to use her powers. A wounded Kirigan emerges from the Fold.

=== Season 2 (2023) ===
No. overall	No. in season	Title	Directed by	Teleplay by	Original release date
9	1	"No Shelter But Me"	Bola Ogun	Eric Heisserer	March 16, 2023
Following the events at West Ravka, a bounty is placed on Kirigan and Alina, who are blamed for expanding the Shadow Fold. Alina is haunted by visions of Kirigan but rejects his overtures. Alina and Mal take refuge in a port city, evading First Army soldiers seeking to arrest them with the help of Novyi Zem merchants and the ship workers Tamar Kir-Bataar and Tolya Yul-Bataar. Meanwhile, in Ketterdam the Crows Kaz, and Jesper are arrested after being framed by Pekka Rollins for the murder of Tante Heleen. They are freed by the privateer Sturmhond, who is also searching for Alina. Kaz and Jesper escape Sturmhond and reunite with Inej, Nina, and Wylan. Kaz agrees to help Nina infiltrate Hellgate in return for her heartrending powers. Seeking retribution against Pekka, Kaz blows up the Kaelish Prince gambling hall, which had formerly been the Crow Club. Alina and Mal discover their Captain Sturmhond, who is interested in Alina's sun-summoning powers. Meanwhile, Kirigan saves several Grisha including Genya Safin from being killed by the First Army. He takes the opportunity to recruit them.
10	2	"Rusalye"	Bola Ogun	Nick Culbertson	March 16, 2023
Alina convinces Sturmhond to support her quest to destroy the Shadow Fold. To strengthen her powers, she convinces Sturmhond and his crew to take part in an expedition to track down a Sea Whip in order to harness its powers. During the voyage, Alina befriends the heartrenders Tolya and Tamar. The expedition manages to trap a Sea Whip in its lair but Alina is forced to kill the sea monster after it kills several crew. Alina absorbs the creature's powers and is almost overwhelmed but is saved by Mal's embrace. This surge of power attracts the attention of Kirigan, who struggles with the cost exacted by his dark powers. Kirigan also promises to help Genya find her friend David. Meanwhile, Kaz and his associates including Jesper, Nina, and Wylan take part in a heist against Pekka. Though they fall into a trap, the group escape due to Nina's actions. After securing their object, the group reunites at Black Veil. Elsewhere, Matthias befriends a fellow Fjerdian inmate while in Kerch custody.
11	3	"Like Calls to Like"	Laura Belsey	Donna Thorland	March 16, 2023
A reinvigorated Alina accompanies Sturmhond and his group travel on a flying vessel, known as the Hummingbird into the Fold. Alina attempts to banish the Fold but even her reinvigorated powers are insufficient. After being attacked by Volcra, the ship crashes on Ravkan territory where they are intercepted by First Army soldiers. Sturmhond reveals his true identity as Nikolai Lantsov, Major of the 22nd Regiment and King Pyotr's second son. Nikolai brings her to the Spinning Wheel, a Grisha sanctuary where Alina reunites with Nadia. He offers to protect her by marrying her and placing her under the royal family's protection. Meanwhile, Jesper and Wylan infiltrate Appelbroek by posing as repairmen. Inej learns from Kaz that Pekka murdered his older brother, Jordie Rietveld, and the two find solace in each other. Inej survives an assassination attempt by Mogens. Meanwhile, General Kirigan resumes his hunt for Alina and cuts off his mother Baghra's finger to help find her. David and Genya attempt to leave Kirigan's palace and warn Alina. However, Kirigan uses one of his shadow creatures to attack Genya. Elsewhere, Matthias shuns Nina following a cage fight. Pekka Rollins offers to free Matthias in return for Nina capturing Kaz.
12	4	"Every Monstrous Thing"	Laura Belsey	Shelley Meals	March 16, 2023
Nikolai announces his engagement to Alina, which causes tensions at the Ravkan Royal Court. In private, Alina reaffirms her love for Mal. Nikola's brother Vasily has Mal arrested for desertion. David reaches the royal palace but Alina doesn't trust him and has him imprisoned. During the engagement ceremony, Vasily attempts to reveal Alina's relationship with Mal but the event is interrupted by the arrival of Kirigan and his shadow creatures, leading to a showdown. Meanwhile, in Ketterdam, Kaz and his Crows launch their revenge plot against Pekka, which involves staging a faux Firepox outbreak in bars and brothels owned by Pekka. Following a confrontation with Pekka, Kaz tricks Pekka into believing that he has kidnapped his son Alby Rollins. In return for revealing Alby's supposed location, Kaz forces Pekka to confess to the murders of Tante Heleen and Constable Sem and to produce a quitclaim deed for Inej. Alby is revealed to be safe and well while Pekka is arrested for his crimes. Kaz gives Inej the deed but expels her from the Crows after she freed prisoners without his consent. Elsewhere, Baghra and Genya work together to free themselves from their cages at Kirigan's base.
13	5	"Yuyeh Sesh (Despise Your Heart)"	Karen Gaviola	Christina Strain	March 16, 2023
Alina, Prince Nikolai, David, Queen Tatiana, and other survivors of The Darkling's attack on the royal palace retreat to nearby caves. They are joined by Baghra and Genya, who are able to track them down through David's heartbeat. Genya confesses to her role in Kirigan's plot to poison King Pyotr but manages to convince Nikolai not to punish her after admitting that the late King was her rapist. After escaping arrest, Mal reunites with Alina and the others. Alina uses her powers to project herself onto Kirigan but fails to destroy their link after being distracted by Mal. Meanwhile, the Crows are met by Tolya, Tamar, and Zoya as they are asked to steal the Neshyenyer, a blade sharp enough to cut through shadow, explaining that it's needed in order to defeat the Darkling's shadow creatures. The Crows, along with Zoya and Tolya, travel to Shu Han to obtain the Neshyenyer sword. While searching for clues about the enigmatic Disciple, the group breaks into the home of the Disciple's assistant Ohval Saran. However, the four are trapped by Ohval. Meanwhile, Pekka arrives in Hellgate where he fatally beats Matthias' cellmate and becomes the new "top dog" of the prison.
14	6	"Ni Weh Sesh (I Have No Heart)"	Karen Gaviola	Daegan Fryklind	March 16, 2023
Determined to destroy the Darkling, Alina, Baghra, and Mal travel to Morozova's workshop. Baghra reveals that she is the daughter of Morozova but was banished after accidentally killing her sister with a telekinetic Cut. Alina and Mal learn that Morozova resurrected Baghra's sister as an Amplifier with Merzost. Mal also learns that he is the third Amplifier as the descendant of Baghra's sister, a position passed down over the generations. As the Firebird, Mal must sacrifice himself on Alina's blade in order to destroy the Fold. When Kirigan reappears as a projection and attacks Alina, Baghra sacrifices her life to save Alina and Mal. However, Kirigan learns about Mal's identity as the Firebird after turning his late mother into an Amplifier. Meanwhile, in Shu Han, the Crows experience hallucinations caused by Ohval's poisonous flowers: Jesper sees his late mother, Tolya sees a dying Tamar who blames him, and Inej sees Kaz and her having a romantic, tender moment. Kaz sees his late brother, Jordie, drowning him and criticizing his excuses and choices, but later sees Inej saving him. After the four neutralize the flowers with butterflies, Ohval reveals herself as Sankta Neyar, the Saint who forged the Neshyenyer. The Disciple is revealed to be her husband. Tolya manages to convince Ohval to give them the Neshyenyer in order to fight the Darkling.
15	7	"Meet You in the Meadow"	Mairzee Almas	Vanya Asher	March 16, 2023
The Darkling attempts to convince Mal to abandon his plan to sacrifice himself as the third amplifier. Though Mal refuses, he learns that he and Kirigan are related. Alina reveals Mal's identity as the third amplifier to Nikolai. With the Darkling and his forces approaching Alina, Mal, and Nikolai hold a war council to discuss their next move. Believing that Kirigan plans to attack the orphanage at Keramzin, they split their forces. While Alina and Mal travel into the Fold, Nikolai uses his flying ship to reach Keramzin with reinforcements. However, the Darkling's Grisha led by Fruzsi and Nisho shoot down Nikolai's ship. Nikolai and his surviving soldiers retreat to a nearby fort, which is enveloped by the Fold. With the help of Kaz, Jesper, and Wylan, Nikolai's forces ambush and kill Kirigan's Grisha followers within the fort's moat. Both sides suffered heavy casualties including Nikolai's commander Dominik. David also sacrifices himself to protect Genya from one of Kirigan's Nichevo'ya. Meanwhile, Alina, Mal, Inej, Nina, and Zoya sail to the heart of the Fold to destroy it. Before Alina and Mal can put their plan into action, they are attacked by the Darkling, who injures Mal. Alina manages to wound Kirigan with the Cut.
16	8	"No Funerals"	Mairzee Almas	Eric Heisserer & Erin Conley	March 16, 2023
Inside the besieged fort, Nikolai and Wylan fight a Nichevo'ya, a shadowy creature created by the Darkling. Putting their plan into action, Alina stabs Mal through the heart, killing him and unleashing a massive amount of energy that destroys the Fold. Following the Fold's destruction, Kirigan attempts to take advantage of Alina's grief by proposing a relationship with her. Alina however rejects Kirigan's overtures and stabs him to death. Despite Baghra's warnings, Alina decides to use Merzost to resurrect Mal. After vanquishing the Darkling's Nichevo'ya, Alina and her allies burn Kirigan's body to prevent his followers from using his body for relics. Genya mourns over David's death and discovers he intended to propose to her, with a ring he was going to make for her. Mal decides to become a privateer and joins Inej, Tamar, Tolya, and Nadia on their flying ship. Nina travels to Hellgate with a royal pardon for Matthias. With Pekka's permission, Matthias takes part in a fight but refuses to kill two wolves due to his drüskelle beliefs. After resisting, Matthias is beaten up by the guards. Elsewhere, Kaz informs his fellow Crows that their new job involves smuggling jurda parem, a drug that enhances Grishas' powers. During Nikolai and Alina's coronation ceremony, a Heartrender, under the influence of Jurda Parem, makes an assassination attempt. However, Alina kills the assassin with the Cut, drawing on her new shadow powers.

== Production ==
=== Development ===
In January 2019, Netflix announced a series order for an eight-episode first season of Shadow and Bone, with Eric Heisserer serving as showrunner, creator, head writer, and executive producer. The series is produced under Netflix's deal with 21 Laps Entertainment, with Shawn Levy executive producing. Other executive producers included Leigh Bardugo, Pouya Shahbazian, Dan Levine, Dan Cohen, and Josh Barry. On October 2, 2019, it was confirmed that Lee Toland Krieger would direct the pilot episode.

In June 2021, the series was renewed for an eight-episode second season. Production for the second season officially began in January 2022. By December 2022, it was reported that the second season would not only adapt Siege and Storm but also cover elements from Ruin and Rising, completing Leigh Bardugo's main Grishaverse trilogy.

Following the release of season two, Heisserer revealed that scripts for a potential spin-off series centered on the Crows were already written. However, he emphasized that the future of Shadow and Bone and any spin-offs would depend on the viewership of season two. On November 15, 2023, Netflix canceled Shadow and Bone after two seasons. Plans for the Crows spin-off were subsequently abandoned as well.

=== Language ===
In a panel discussion led by Petra Mayer, NPR books editor, at San Diego Comic-Con 2019, Leigh Bardugo revealed that David J. Peterson, known for his work on creating fictional languages for shows like Game of Thrones, would be developing the languages for the Grishaverse in Shadow and Bone. Christian Thalmann was also involved in contributing to the creation of these fictional languages.

=== Casting ===
Casting for Shadow and Bone began in April 2019, with auditions for the lead role of Alina Starkov. On October 2, 2019, it was officially announced that Jessie Mei Li would star as Alina, with Ben Barnes, Freddy Carter, Archie Renaux, Amita Suman and Kit Young joining as key supporting actors. Additional cast members included Sujaya Dasgupta, Danielle Galligan, Daisy Head and Simon Sears.

A second round of casting was announced on December 18, 2019, which brought Calahan Skogman, Zoë Wanamaker, Kevin Eldon, Julian Kostov, Luke Pasqualino, Jasmine Blackborow and Gabrielle Brooks to the recurring cast. Leigh Bardugo, the author of the book series, was also scheduled for a cameo appearance as a Materialki Durast in the third episode of the season.

While prominent characters Nikolai Lantsov and Wylan Van Eck were absent from the first season, they were introduced in the second season. On January 13, 2022, Lewis Tan, Patrick Gibson, Anna Leong Brophy and Jack Wolfe were officially added to the cast for the second season, with Daisy Head, Danielle Galligan, and Calahan Skogman promoted to series regulars. Further new cast members were confirmed in November 2022, including Tommy Rodger, Rhoda Ofori-Attah, Alistair Nwachukwu, Tumi Fani-Kayode, and Seamus O'Hara.

=== Filming and locations ===
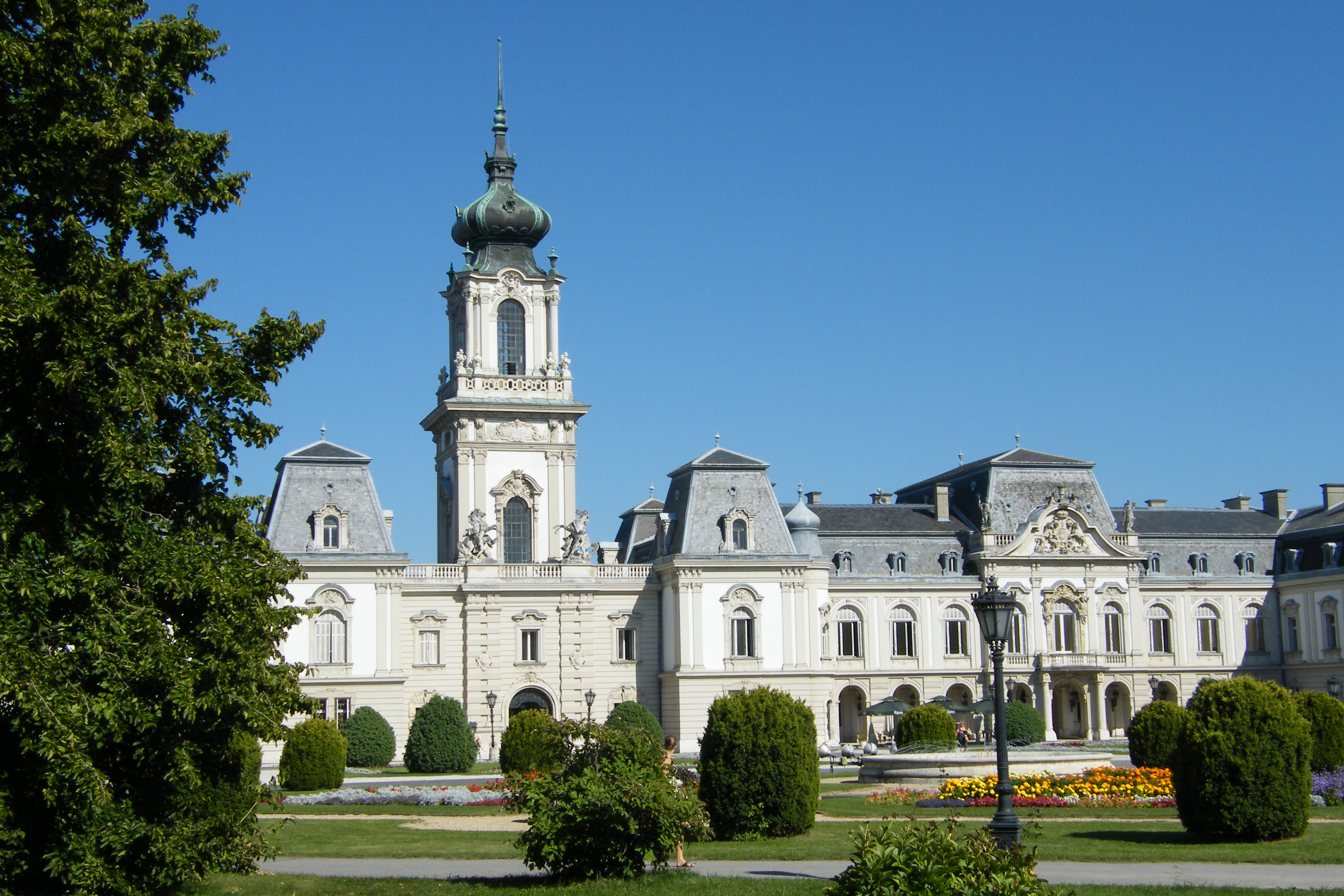
Festetics Palace is used as the Little Palace in the series.

Principal photography for the first season of Shadow and Bone commenced on location in and around Budapest and Keszthely, Hungary, in October 2019 and concluded at the end of February 2020. Additional shoots took place in Vancouver in September 2020.

The set for Ketterdam was constructed at Origo Studios. Several locations around Budapest were used for key scenes, including the Ethnographic Museum (used as the Grand Palace throne room), Buda Castle (for the Royal Archives exterior and its medieval rondella for the Grisha training grounds and Os Alta gates), the old Stock Exchange (for the Royal Archives interior), and the main square (as Novokribirsk).

Outside of Budapest, Festetics Palace was used for both the exterior and interior of the Little Palace, with the winter fete taking place in its concert hall. Other filming locations included the Amadé–Bajzáth–Pappenheim Mansion (as the Keramzin orphanage), the town of Szentendre (depicting Ryevost), its open-air museum (as Chernast), and the Royal Palace of Gödöllő (used for the stable and chapel). The flashback scene where the Black Heretic creates the Shadow Fold was filmed at the ruined Széchényi–Wenckheim mansion in Békéscsaba.

Filming for the second season began in early January 2022 and wrapped on June 6, 2022.

=== Post-production ===
Post-production for Shadow and Bone commenced after filming wrapped in February 2020. In June 2020, Leigh Bardugo reported via Twitter that working remotely due to the COVID-19 pandemic had slowed down the post-production process, making the release date uncertain. Ted Rae served as the VFX supervisor for the series.

=== Music ===
Shadow and Bone (Music from the Netflix Series)

Soundtrack album by Joseph Trapanese
- Released: April 23, 2021
- Genre: Soundtrack
- Length: 1:34:00
- Label: Maisie Music Publishing

Joseph Trapanese composed the score for Shadow and Bone. Eric Heisserer and Leigh Bardugo previewed some of the score during a panel at New York Comic Con in October 2020. By December 16, 2020, executive producer Josh Barry confirmed that the final sound mix had been completed.

Trapanese composed the score over the course of 11 months. In an interview with AwardsDaily.com, he detailed how he assembled the score during lockdown, conducting an orchestra remotely via Zoom and incorporating solo recordings. The score drew inspiration from Russian and Slavic music, with Sergei Prokofiev and traditional folk songs serving as specific influences. Trapanese also incorporated elements from other musical traditions, such as gamelan, to add diversity to the soundtrack.

Shadow and Bone (Music from the Netflix Series)
No.	Title	Length
1.	"Ravka"	3:45
2.	"Ask the Saints"	6:32
3.	"Court Demonstration"	3:09
4.	"True North"	6:21
5.	"Royal Archives Heist"	4:09
6.	"Face the Truth"	4:42
7.	"Erase the Past"	2:19
8.	"Memories"	8:30
9.	"Hope for the Future"	2:10
10.	"Her Name Is Alina Starkov"	2:57
11.	"The Heretic"	5:04
12.	"Just Ask"	5:32
13.	"Shipwrecked"	2:32
14.	"A Message"	5:46
15.	"Helpful Goat"	7:24
16.	"Fight for the Light"	5:41
17.	"Five Markers"	4:06
18.	"Strike Now"	6:12
19.	"Follow"	7:29
Total length:		1:34:00

Shadow and Bone: Season 2 (Soundtrack from the Netflix Series)

Soundtrack album by Joseph Trapanese
- Released: March 10, 2023
- Genre: Soundtrack
- Length: 1:44:00
- Label: Maisie Music Publishing

Shadow and Bone: Season 2 (Soundtrack from the Netflix Series)
No.	Title	Length
1.	"On the Run"	3:42
2.	"Market Chase"	2:49
3.	"Tolya and Tamar"	2:14
4.	"Wylan"	2:28
5.	"Come Sail Away"	2:03
6.	"Brother"	1:47
7.	"Arriving at the Island"	1:09
8.	"Crows Ambushed"	2:27
9.	"Return of the Useless Grunt"	1:25
10.	"I'm Here for the Killers"	2:16
11.	"Matthias Fights"	4:22
12.	"The Night We Met"	2:01
13.	"Become the Blade"	7:55
14.	"Jesper's Past"	1:10
15.	"Hope is Dangerous"	2:24
16.	"Shu Han"	5:18
17.	"The Disciple"	7:00
18.	"I Can't Lose You"	4:35
19.	"Deserve Her"	3:59
20.	"Chased"	5:13
21.	"Battle at the Moat"	5:47
22.	"Stronger Than an Emerald"	1:50
23.	"We Can Do This"	5:55
24.	"Final Goodbye"	3:19
25.	"Let Me Be Your Monster"	3:51
26.	"Loss and Sacrifice"	3:19
27.	"Hope for the Future"	2:48
28.	"How Will You Have Me"	4:30
29.	"Rise and Fall"	6:15
Total length:		1:44:00

== Marketing and release ==
Netflix released a season one announcement teaser in December 2020, followed by promotional stills through Entertainment Weekly and main character posters in January 2021. In February 2021, Leigh Bardugo, Eric Heisserer, and the six main cast members participated in a panel at the IGN Fan Fest, where a teaser trailer was unveiled, along with additional stills. The day before, Netflix had posted a poster featuring the Shadow Fold. The official trailer for season one was released on March 30, 2021, by Netflix, after an earlier leak.

In a November 2019 interview with SensaCine, Bardugo mentioned that the series was expected to air in late 2020. Ultimately, Shadow and Bone premiered on April 23, 2021, on Netflix. The following day, Netflix released an aftershow titled Shadow and Bone – The Afterparty. The second season of the series was released on March 16, 2023. The official trailer for season two was released on February 17, 2023.

== Reception ==
=== Audience viewership ===
Netflix announced alongside the season two renewal that 55 million households had watched the first season within its first 28 days of availability. For season two, Netflix reported that it had been viewed for 192.9 million hours between January and June 2023, making it the 26th most-watched show on Netflix during that period, out of 18,000 titles. According to a report by Eshap, the combined hours viewed for both seasons in the first half of 2023 amounted to 292.4 million hours, which ranked the series at number 15 on the list of the most-watched shows during that time.

Season two remained in Netflix's Global Top 10 for five weeks and was in the top 10 of 86 countries for up to six weeks after its release. Shadow and Bone also ranked number two on the Nielsen charts in the week of its release, with over 1.14 billion minutes watched by subscribers, including episodes from season one. It stayed among the top 10 original series for four weeks after its premiere, compared to a five-week run during season one, although the viewing time was about the same. According to TheWrap, based on data gathered by Whip Media, Shadow and Bone was number 24 on the list of the most-watched series across all streaming platforms in 2023.

Media Play News reported, using PlumResearch data, that season two of Shadow and Bone reached 3.1 million unique viewers on Netflix during the week ending April 2, 2023, with an average time spent of 169 minutes.

=== Critical response ===
As of January 2024, the show has a rating of 7.5 out of 10 on IMDb based on 112,000 ratings. It was number 10 on the list of the most searched shows worldwide on Google in 2023. In January 2024, Shadow and Bone was voted Fan Favorite Series of 2023 on Rotten Tomatoes. The show took the lead with 54% of votes while the remaining four shows in the top five all earned just 4% of the vote.

==== Season 1 ====
Shadow and Bone has received generally positive reviews from critics. For the first season, Rotten Tomatoes reported an approval rating of 89% based on 81 reviews, with an average rating of 7.4/10. The website's critics consensus reads, "From gorgeous costumes to impressive—if intimidating—world-building, Shadow and Bone is an exciting adventure for fans and newcomers alike." Metacritic gave the first season a weighted average score of 68 out of 100, based on 22 reviews, indicating "generally favorable reviews".

Ben Travis of Empire gave the first season 3 out of 5 stars, praising the world-building and the engaging lead characters but noting similarities to Harry Potter, The Hunger Games, and Game of Thrones. He described some elements of the series as "overly confusing" but concluded that "Shadow and Bone will draw you into the Fold with its absorbing world-building and engaging lead duo." Nicole Clark of IGN remarked that the season "captures much of the darker magic...while being unafraid to make smart changes to certain characters' origin stories and even the sequence of events—even if the storylines from the two series of books don't always easily mesh." Molly Freeman of Screen Rant called it a "thrillingly exciting fantasy drama".

Writing for RogerEbert.com, Roxana Hadadi acknowledged the series' use of young adult fiction clichés but praised the cast and the fight sequences. She wrote, "Eric Heisserer's adaptation transcends this familiarity thanks to the commitment of a pitch-perfect cast, well-stylized fight sequences, and intentional character development." She concluded, "Shadow and Bone maintains a sense of interior place for the characters... and the well-balanced nature of this first season makes for a promising introduction into this franchise's fantastical universe."

Yaameen Al-Muttaqi of The Daily Star praised the darker themes explored in the series due to the older ages of the characters compared to the books, highlighting themes like "abuse, corruption, propaganda, manipulation, and human trafficking." However, he was critical of the lack of world-building, concluding that "a fair number of things are also left unexplained or unexplored in the series, which may leave viewers who have not read the books, confused." Allison Nichols of Tell-Tale TV similarly noted that viewers unfamiliar with the source material may feel isolated when the series "throw[s] them in storylines that seemingly have nothing to do with the main storyline of the show — Alina's journey."

==== Season 2 ====
For the second season of Shadow and Bone, Rotten Tomatoes reports an approval rating of 83% based on 24 reviews, with an average rating of 6.0/10. The website's critics consensus states, "Shadow and Bone's sophomore season packs in too much story sinew to properly breathe, but this adventure remains great fun for fantasy fans." On Metacritic, the second season received a score of 73, based on reviews from 8 critics, indicating "generally favorable reviews". On January 22, 2024, Shadow and Bone won the Golden Tomato Award for "Fan Favorite TV series of 2023", a fan voted award organized by Rotten Tomatoes.

Lacy Baugher Milas of Paste Magazine provided a critical review, describing the second season as "not only poorly paced but narratively overstuffed, crammed with new characters, superfluous side quests, and rapid-fire plot revelations that are rarely given enough time to breathe, let alone develop fully." Milas noted that the expanded plotlines resulted in minimal exploration of the emotional fallout experienced by the characters. However, she praised the performances of Jessie Mei Li, Archie Renaux, Danielle Galligan, Kit Young, Jack Wolfe, Ben Barnes, and Zoë Wanamaker.

Abby Cavenaugh of Collider gave the second season a B− rating, calling it "more of a lackluster and uneven follow-up" but still an "entertaining ride from start to finish". Cavenaugh attributed the crammed plotlines to the adaptation of material from six of Leigh Bardugo's novels: Siege and Storm, Ruin and Rising, Six of Crows, Crooked Kingdom, King of Scars, and The Lives of Saints. She praised Ben Barnes' portrayal of the Darkling, likening it to Michael B. Jordan's performance of Erik Killmonger in Black Panther, while also commending newcomers Patrick Gibson, Lewis Tan, and Anna Leong Brophy. However, Cavenaugh criticized their "overacting" and felt that Calahan Skogman's character, Matthias, was underdeveloped.

Samantha H. Chung of The Harvard Crimson gave a mixed review, praising the performances of Freddy Carter, Amita Suman, Patrick Gibson, and Daisy Head while criticizing the second season's pacing and cramming of multiple storylines. Chung felt that the breakneck pace impacted the development of character relationships but praised the expansive worldbuilding, visually stunning settings, exploration of Alina's biracial identity, and the chemistry between Kit Young and Jack Wolfe's characters.

=== Awards and nominations ===
Year	Award	Category	Nominee	Result	Ref.
2021	IFTA Film & Drama Awards	Best VFX	Ed Bruce and Robert Hartigan	Nominated	
2021	Dragon Awards	Best Science Fiction or Fantasy TV Series	Shadow and Bone	Nominated	
2023	Emmy Awards	Outstanding Special Visual Effects	"Rusalye", Ante Dekovic, Helen Jen, Richard Macks, Gergely Galisz, Juri Stanossek, Adam Balentine, Jane Byrne, Håvard Munkejord, Angel Rico	Nominated	
2024	Visual Effects Society Awards	Outstanding Animated Character in an Episode or Real-Time Project	José María del Fresno, Matthieu Poirey, Carlos Puigdollers, Guillermo Ramos (for No Funerals; Nichevo'ya the Shadow Monster)	Nominated	

== Cancellation ==
=== Season 3 ===
Netflix officially canceled Shadow and Bone on November 15, 2023, despite its strong performance earlier in the year. The series was the 15th most-watched show on Netflix during the first half of 2023, the 10th most Googled show worldwide in 2023, and had remained in the top 10 in 86 countries for up to six weeks after its release. The cancellation followed the end of the 2023 SAG-AFTRA strike and the 2023 Writers Guild of America strike, which Netflix cited as the reason for ending the show.

Eric Heisserer, the showrunner of Shadow and Bone, was part of the Negotiating Committee during the strike, and several key cast and crew members, including Leigh Bardugo, Ben Barnes, Daeghan Fryklind, Shelley Meals, Christina Strain, Erin Conley, Stacy Milbourn, and Lilly Slaydon, also participated in the labor action. Following the cancellation, numerous media outlets criticized Netflix's decision, arguing that it was a misstep based on the series' strong viewership data.

=== Six of Crows spin-off ===
Following the cancellation of Shadow and Bone, Netflix confirmed that it would not move forward with the Six of Crows spin-off. The script for the spin-off had been commissioned and completed before the release of season 2. Eric Heisserer shared a sizzle reel for the planned spin-off in a Reddit comment, giving fans a glimpse of what could have been.

=== Fan campaign ===
In response to the cancellation, a petition titled "SAVE Shadow and Bone!!!" was created on Change.org on November 16, 2023, garnering more than 120,000 signatures within four days. The petition became the most signed renewal petition on Change.org in 2023.

Additionally, a Kickstarter campaign was launched on November 18, 2023, to fund a billboard campaign in Los Angeles and London. The campaign closed on December 23, 2023, having raised $13,882 from 457 backers. The two billboards were unveiled on January 23, 2024.
