= Gabrielle Brooks =

English actress

- Born: 28 January 1990 (age 36); London, England
- Education: Liverpool Institute for Performing Arts (BA)
- Occupation: Actress
- Years active: 1997–present

Gabrielle Brooks (born 28 January 1990) is an English actress. She was nominated for a Laurence Olivier Award for her performance in Get Up, Stand Up! The Bob Marley Musical. She began her career as a child actress in Andrew Lloyd Webber's Whistle Down the Wind. She is creative director of the Mawa Theatre Company and producer of the interview series BlackStage UK.

== Life and career ==
Brooks was born and raised in London. She is half Jamaican, half Guyanese. She has two sisters. She attended Sir George Monoux College in Walthamstow before going on to train at the Liverpool Institute for Performing Arts, graduating with a Bachelor of Arts in 2011. She was a contributing writer to 50 Women in Theatre, 2021.

Brooks became interested in acting when her parents enrolled her in an after school acting programme. She got her first role at the age of 7 through her teacher's agency in Andrew Lloyd Webber's Whistle Down the Wind at Aldwych Theatre.

== Filmography ==
Year	Title	Role	Notes
2001	Grange Hill	Gossip Girl	1 episode
2006	Notes on a Scandal	Choir member	
2007	Coming Down the Mountain	Lisa	Television film
2008	You Will See Life	Anne	Short film
2021	BlackStage UK		Documentary series; creator and producer
2021	Shadow and Bone	Nadia Zhabin	Recurring role

== Stage ==
Year	Title	Role	Notes
1997–2000	Whistle Down the Wind	Lavonne	Aldwych Theatre
2003–2004	Chitty Chitty Bang Bang	Sewage Child	London Palladium
2004	The Wizard of Oz	Dorothy Gale	(Islington Youth) Sadler's Wells Theatre
2004	CBBC Proms in the Park	Singer	Hyde Park
2005	The Demon Headmaster	Mandy	Embassy Theatre
2006	BBC Children in Need	Singer	Wembley Arena / UK Tour
2008	Musical Mania	Elphaba	Millfield Theatre
2012	Avenue Q	Gary Coleman (understudy) / Ensemble / Mrs. T / Yellow Bear	Theatre Royal, Bath / UK Tour
2012	Our House 10th Anniversary Concert	Ensemble	Savoy Theatre
2013	Hairspray	Little Inez	UK Tour
2014	I Can't Sing!	Chenice (understudy) / Ensemble	London Palladium
2015	The Book of Mormon	Nabalungi (understudy)	Prince of Wales Theatre
2016	Red Snapper	George	Belgrade Theatre, Coventry
2017	The Wizard of Oz	Dorothy Gale	Crucible Theatre, Sheffield
2017	Queen Anne	Jezebel (understudy)	Royal Shakespeare Company, Theatre Royal Haymarket
2017	Everybody's Talking About Jamie	Becca	Crucible Theatre, Sheffield
2017	Lazarus	Teen Girl	King's Cross Theatre
2018	The Way of the World	Mincing	Donmar Warehouse
2018	The Light Princess in Concert	Piper	Cadogan Hall
2018	Kwame Kwei-Armah's Twelfth Night	Viola	The Young Vic
2018–2019	Our Lady of Kibeho	Alphonsine	Royal & Derngate, Northampton
2019	A Midsummer Night's Dream	Hermia	Regent's Park Open Air Theatre
2019	Anna Bella Eema	Two / Annabella	Arcola Theatre
2021	J'Ouvert	Nadine	Harold Pinter Theatre, London
2021–2023	Get Up, Stand Up! The Bob Marley Musical	Rita Marley	Lyric Theatre

== Awards and nominations ==
Year	Award	Category	Work	Result	Ref
2022	Laurence Olivier Awards	Best Actress in a Supporting Role in a Musical	Get Up, Stand Up! The Bob Marley Musical	Nominated	
