= Anna Leong Brophy =

British comedian and actor

- Occupations: Actor, comedian
- Years active: 2013–present

Anna Leong Brophy is a British comedian and actor.

== Early life ==
Leong Brophy grew up in Brent, North West London. She is of Irish and Sino-Kadazan descent.

== Career ==
Leong Brophy presents the Still Legit podcast with her comedy partner Emily Lloyd-Saini, with whom she has performed at the Edinburgh Festival Fringe as part of BattleActs! and EGG. She has also starred in TV series, video games, audiobooks, plays, and films.

In January 2022, it was announced Leong Brophy would play Tamar Kir-Bataar in the second season of the Netflix fantasy series Shadow and Bone.

== Filmography ==
Year	Title	Role	Notes
2013	A Kiss So Warm and Tender	Mae	Short
2015	Jade Dragon	Grace	Short
2016	The Conversations	Jodie	
2017	Sparebnb	Tokyo	TV series
2017	The Diana Clone	Melissa	Film
2018	Pls Like	Baking Vlogger	TV series
2019	Berlin Station	Lucy Ximen	TV series
2019	EastEnders	DC Hazari	TV series
2019	Paradise War: The Story of Bruno Manser	Olivia Tan	Film
2019–2020	Traces	Louise Chiu Jones	TV series
2020	Last Tango in Halifax	Laura	TV series
2020	Code 404	A.L.	TV series
2020	#SketchPack		Miniseries
2021	Back	Bryony	TV series
2021	NightwatchMan	Gabby Green-Toucan	Miniseries
2021	Shaun the Sheep: The Flight Before Christmas		Short Film
2023	Shadow and Bone	Tamar Kir-Bataar	Main role, season 2
2025	How to Train Your Dragon	Retcha	Film
2026	Directive 8020	Samantha Cooper	Video game

== Audio ==
Year	Title	Role	Notes
2019	Total War: Three Kingdoms	voice actor	Video game
2020	Doctor Who: The Psychic Circus	Juniper/Ragnarok God 2	Audiobook
2021	Thunderbirds: Terror from the Stars	Tin-Tin/Sphere	Audiobook
2024	Rise of the Rōnin	English voices	Video game
