= Frida Skogman =

Swedish footballer

Frida Svensson
Personal information
- Date of birth: 16 October 1989 (age 37)
- Place of birth: Sweden
- Position: Midfielder

Senior career*
Years	Team	Apps	(Gls)
2011–2012	Tölö IF	40	(13)
2013–2016	Eskilstuna United	31	(5)
2017–2020	KIF Orebro	62	(13)
- * Club domestic league appearances and goals as of 02:47, 18 May 2016 (UTC)

Frida Svensson (born 16 October 1989) is a Swedish football midfielder.

== Honours ==
Eskilstuna United DFF

Runner-up

- Damallsvenskan: 2015
