= Calahan Skogman =

American actor (born 1993)

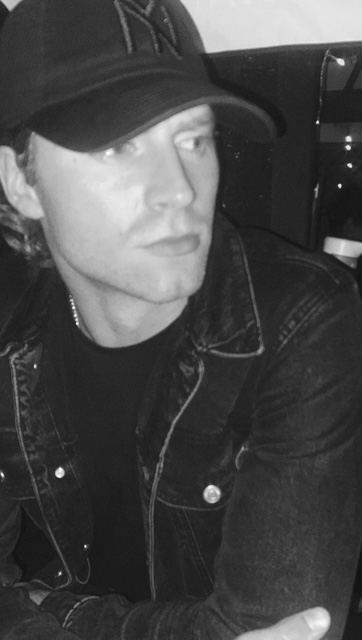
- Skogman in 2022
- Born: Calahan Wade Skogman; May 12, 1993 (age 33); Davenport, Iowa, U.S.
- Education: University of Wisconsin–La Crosse (BA); University of Southern California (MFA)
- Occupations: Actor, author
- Years active: 2017–present

Calahan Wade Skogman (born May 12, 1993) is an American actor, writer, and former collegiate basketball and football player. He played Matthias Helvar in the Netflix series Shadow and Bone (2021–2023).

== Early life and education ==
Skogman was born in Davenport, Iowa to parents Wade and Stefani, and moved to Seymour, Wisconsin as a child. He is of Swedish, English, and German descent on his father's side and Italian and Hungarian on his mother's. He has a younger brother, Clayton. His great uncle is the Budapest-born artist Steven Kemenyffy.

Having played basketball "since I could walk", Skogman earned four titles in basketball and football and one in track & field and baseball at Seymour Community High School and was recruited to the Wisconsin Basketball Coaches Association All-State team as a junior and senior. He had ambitions to join the NBA. In his final year of high school, Skogman was accepted early to the University of Minnesota Duluth. He studied history and played NCAA Division II basketball and football, earning a letter in both sports.

After sophomore year, Skogman transferred to the University of Wisconsin–La Crosse where he earned an All-WIAC First Team Honor. He began his studies in Theatre and Broadcast media and hosted a sports radio show CWSports: The Handle on the campus station RAQ Radio. However, he landed the main role in a production of The Metal Heart, took up acting, and decided to major in Theatre Performance, graduating in 2015.

In 2016, Skogman moved to Los Angeles. In 2019, he received his MFA in Acting from the USC School of Dramatic Arts.

== Career ==
=== Acting career ===
In December 2019, it was announced that Skogman would play Matthias Helvar in the 2021 Netflix series Shadow and Bone, an adaptation of the fantasy book series The Grisha Trilogy and the Six of Crows duology by Leigh Bardugo. A recurring character in season 1, Skogman was promoted to series regular for season 2. The series was cancelled by Netflix after its second season, with a petition having reached more than 200,000 signatures asking Netflix to save it.

In November 2025, Deadline reported that Skogman had joined Dan Fogelman's upcoming NFL series for Hulu in a recurring role.

=== Writing career ===
In August 2024, Skogman published his debut novel, Blue Graffiti. Kirkus Reviews described the book as "a love letter to bar-stool philosophizing and a tender portrait of small-town life with a simple but powerful message: There’s always something special about home. Thoughtful, measured storytelling with moments of tremendous heart."

== Bibliography ==
- Blue Graffiti. Unnamed Press. 2024. ISBN 9781951213954.

== Filmography ==
=== Film ===
Year	Title	Role	Notes
2017	G.I. Jose	Agent Mills	Short film
2018	Smile	Ron	Short film
2019	Blood Puppet! Christmas '94	George	
2020	Catch	Frank the Field Keeper	Short film
2025	A Big Bold Beautiful Journey	Sarah's Groomsman	

=== Television ===
Year	Title	Role	Notes
2021–2023	Shadow and Bone	Matthias Helvar	Recurring role (season 1); Main role (season 2)
2026	Criminal Minds	Agent Joey Barlow	Episode: "Friendly Fire"
TBA	The Land		Recurring role
