= Siege and Storm =

2013 book by Leigh Bardugo

- First edition cover
- Author: Leigh Bardugo
- Cover artist: Rich Deas
- Language: English
- Series: Shadow and Bone trilogy (Book 2)
- Genre: Fantasy, young-adult novel
- Publisher: Macmillan Publishers
- Publication date: June 4, 2013
- Publication place: United States
- Media type: Print (hardcover and paperback), audiobook, e-book
- Pages: 435
- ISBN: 978-0-8050-9460-2
- Preceded by: Shadow and Bone
- Followed by: Ruin and Rising

Siege and Storm is a young adult fantasy adventure written by author Leigh Bardugo and the second book in the Shadow and Bone trilogy preceded by Shadow and Bone and followed by Ruin and Rising. It was published by Macmillan on June 4, 2013.

== Plot ==
It all starts with Alina and Mal in Cofton across the True Sea, away from Ravka. There, Alina and Mal are living while trying to hide from anyone that might be hunting Alina down. As they have an encounter with the Darkling and his soldiers, they sail towards the Bone Road to find another of Morozova's amplifiers.

== Reception ==
Kirkus Reviews stated: "Scheming and action carry readers at a breathless pace to an end that may surprise them and will definitely leave them panting for the series' conclusion." Anita L. Burkam of The Horn Book Magazine opined that the "tension Bardugo sets up between Alinas conflicting desires for power and for love is thoughtfully wrought - and creates an engaging wish-fulfillment fantasy for teens who would be glad to have either." Cindy Welch of the Booklist praised the "fully realized world", the "appealing three-dimensional" characters and the "involving" plot, as well as the "introspective moments that will bond readers to the main characters and have them tapping their feet impatiently for the concluding volume."

== Sequels and related works ==
Its sequel and third book in the trilogy, Ruin and Rising, was published in June 2014.

Also set in the same world as the trilogy are the Six of Crows (2015) and Crooked Kingdom (2016) duology; the standalone short story collection The Language of Thorns; and the King of Scars (2019) and Rule of Wolves (2021) duology, which features characters from both the original trilogy and Six of Crows.
