= Shadow and Bone =

2012 fantasy novel by Leigh Bardugo

- First edition cover
- Author: Leigh Bardugo
- Audio read by: Lauren Fortgang
- Cover artist: Rich Deas
- Language: English
- Series: Shadow and Bone trilogy (Book 1)
- Genre: Fantasy, young-adult novel
- Publisher: Macmillan Publishers
- Publication date: June 5, 2012
- Publication place: United States
- Media type: Print (hardcover and paperback), audiobook, e-book
- Pages: 358
- ISBN: 978-0-8050-9459-6
- Followed by: Siege and Storm

Shadow and Bone is a young adult fantasy adventure and the debut novel written by the American author Leigh Bardugo. It was published by Macmillan Publishers on June 5, 2012. The novel follows Alina Starkov, a teenage orphan who grows up in the Russia-inspired land of Ravka when, one day, she unexpectedly harnesses a power she never knew she had, becoming a target of intrigue and violence. It is the first book in the Shadow and Bone trilogy, followed by Siege and Storm and Ruin and Rising. It is also the basis for the Netflix adaptation, Shadow and Bone, which premiered in April 2021.

== Plot ==
Alina Starkov is a teenage girl who grew up with Malyen (Mal) Oretsev at an orphanage in Keramzin in the Kingdom of Ravka. The story begins as they march through the Shadow Fold (also called the Unsea), a perpetually dark, barren strip of land cutting most of Ravka off from the sea. Periodic expeditions sent across the Fold to transport goods and bring back imports are often plagued by monsters called volcra that inhabit the Unsea. During their crossing, the volcra attack, and, while saving Mal, Alina displays an extraordinary Grisha talent. The Grisha are people with the ability to manipulate the elements to use as weapons, e.g. to call fire, to summon wind, to regulate hearts. Alina is able to summon light and is thus considered a Sun Summoner, a type of Grisha originally presumed to be a myth. There are some people who think she is a saint whose purpose is to destroy the Shadow Fold.

The leader of the Grisha, the Darkling, rushes Alina to the capital Os Alta at the Little Palace, a place full of Grisha. He says her power is unique and valuable which makes her an assassination target by the enemies of Ravka. She struggles to fit in with other Grisha and to have confidence in her own abilities as she begins rigorous training, however, she does make friends with Genya Safin, a rare Grisha Tailor who can alter the appearances of people. Throughout her time at the place, Alina feels a strong attraction to the Darkling, which he seems to reciprocate. During two encounters they kiss, and she is confused by her reactions to the kisses.

After demonstrating her power to the King and his court, Alina is told by her tutor, Baghra, that she must flee. Baghra reveals herself as the Darkling's mother. She explains that the Darkling is hundreds of years old, intentionally created the Unsea, and intends to enslave Alina in order to use her Grisha power to conquer the world. Two weeks into Alina's flight, she is nearly captured, but is saved by Mal who has a close to supernatural ability to track, and was sent to find her. Instead of turning her in, he helps her escape.

They decide to hunt a magic stag in the far north. If Alina kills the stag and makes a collar of its antlers, her powers will be greatly amplified. After much time and effort, Alina and Mal find the stag, just as they realize how much they love each other. She refuses to kill the stag, and the stag acknowledges this. At that moment the Darkling and his minions appear. The Darkling kills the stag and forces the antler collar on Alina, making her his absolute slave, unable to disobey him in the slightest.

They quickly return south to the major crossing point of the Unsea. The Darkling forces Alina to protect the ship during the crossing. Near the other side, the Darkling extends the Unsea, causing great death, and destruction in Novo Kribirsk. He then throws Mal off the ship, onto the Unsea, to be devoured by monsters. In desperation, Alina finally realizes that her act of mercy, sparing the stag, gives her the possibility to break free of the Darkling's enslavement. Her love of Mal grants her the strength she needs. Alina breaks free, leaps out of the ship, saves Mal, and destroys the ship.

The book ends with Mal and Alina taking passage across the True Sea, escaping from Ravka and the Darkling.

== Development ==
Shadow and Bone is Bardugo's first novel. When Entertainment Weekly questioned Bardugo about her inspiration for the series, she explained, "In most fantasy, darkness is metaphorical; it's just a way of talking about evil (darkness falls across the land, a dark age is coming, etc.). I wanted to take something figurative and make it literal. So the question became, 'What if darkness was a place?' What if the monsters lurking there were real and more horrible than anything you'd ever imagined beneath your bed or behind the closet door? What if you had to fight them on their own territory, blind and helpless in the dark? These ideas eventually became the Shadow Fold."

Bardugo defines its genre as Tsarpunk - a fantasy with inspiration from early 19th century Russia. When asked why she chose this particular setting, Bardugo explained, "I think there's tremendous power in the images we associate with Russian culture and history, these extremes of beauty and brutality that lend themselves to fantasy. And honestly, as much as I love broadswords and flagons of ale—and believe me, I do—I wanted to take readers someplace a little different. Tsarist Russia gave me a different point of departure."

Bardugo progressed through the steps of querying agents to accepting representation to being offered a three-book deal in 37 days. The Grisha series went to auction on December 1, 2010 and was sold to Henry Holt and Co./Macmillan on December 3, 2010. Shadow and Bone, the first book in the trilogy, was published in June 2012.

== Reception ==
Publishers Weekly commented that "Alina's angst and aggression are a bit of a letdown, but Bardugo's storytelling and world-building more than compensate." An unnamed reviewer for Kirkus Reviews praised Bardugo for "allow[ing] the details of Grisha magic to unfold with limited exposition, using Alina's ignorance for readers' benefit", but described the world-building as being "continually undercut by clunky colloquialisms". The reviewer concluded: "The plotting is powerful enough to carry most readers past flaws and into the next book in the series."

== Sequels and related works ==
Its sequel and second book in the trilogy, Siege and Storm, was published in June 2013. The final book in the trilogy, Ruin and Rising, was published in June 2014.

Also set in the same world as the trilogy are the Six of Crows (2015) and Crooked Kingdom (2016) duology; the standalone short story collection The Language of Thorns, the in-universe hagiography The Lives of Saints, and the writer's introspective journal The Severed Moon; and the King of Scars (2019) and Rule of Wolves (2021) duology, which features characters from both the original trilogy and Six of Crows.

== Adaptations ==
In September 2012, Holly Bario, president of DreamWorks' production, announced that she had picked up the movie rights to Shadow and Bone. David Heyman, who produced the Harry Potter films, was announced as producer. Jeffrey Clifford, president of Heyday Films, would also produce the film.

In January 2019, Netflix ordered an eight-episode series based on the Grisha Trilogy and the Six of Crows duology with Eric Heisserer as showrunner. Production began in October 2019 with Jessie Mei Li as Alina Starkov, Ben Barnes as General Kirigan (The Darkling), Archie Renaux as Malyen Oretsev, Sujaya Dasgupta as Zoya Nazyalensky, Daisy Head as Genya Safin, and Simon Sears as Ivan.

All eight episodes of the first season were released on April 23, 2021. The eight episodes of season two were released on March 16, 2023.

On 27th September 2022, the graphic novel adaptation of Demon In The Wood, the 2014 short story depicting the Darkling's origins, was released. It is illustrated by Dani Pendergast.
