= Leigh Bardugo =

American fantasy author (born 1975)

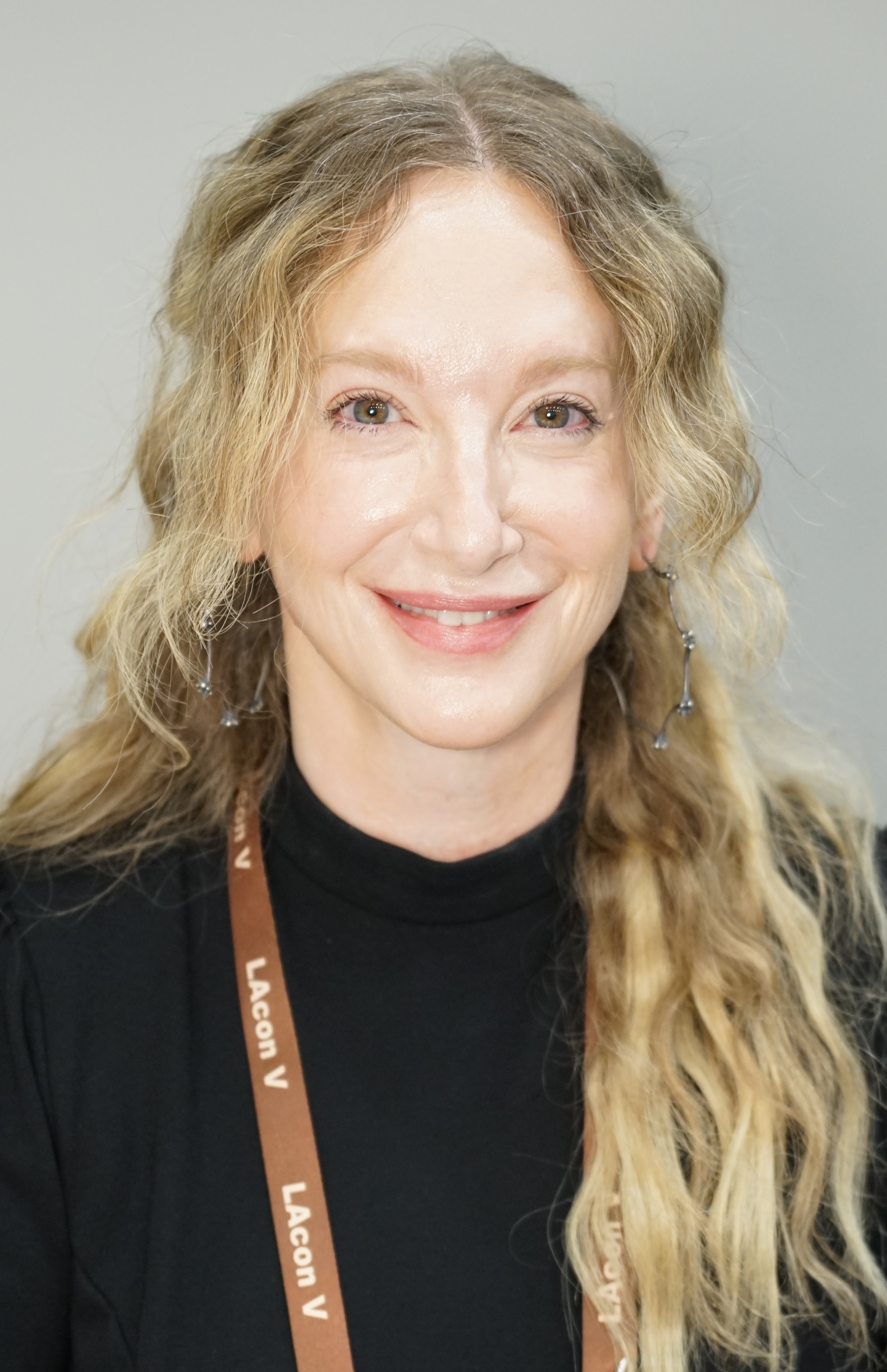
- Bardugo at 2026 Worldcon
- Born: April 6, 1975 (age 51); Jerusalem, Israel
- Citizenship: Israel, USA
- Education: Yale University (B.A.)
- Occupation: Novelist
- Writing career
- Period: 2012–present
- Genres: Young adult fiction, fantasy, superhero fiction, horror fiction
- Notable works: Shadow and Bone trilogy Six of Crows duology King of Scars duology
- Notable awards: Inkpot Award
- Website: leighbardugo.com

Leigh Bardugo (born April 6, 1975) is an American fantasy author. She is best known for her young adult Grishaverse novels, which include the Shadow and Bone trilogy and the Six of Crows and King of Scars duologies. She also received acclaim for her paranormal fantasy adult debut, Ninth House. The Shadow and Bone and Six of Crows series have been adapted into Shadow and Bone by Netflix, and Ninth House will be adapted by Amazon Studios; Bardugo is an executive producer of both works.

== Early life and education ==
Bardugo was born in Jerusalem and grew up in Los Angeles, California, where she was raised by her grandparents. She is Jewish, descended from Spanish Jews on one side and Russian and Lithuanian Jews on the other.

Bardugo graduated from Yale University with a degree in English in 1997. She was a member of the Wolf's Head secret society. Before publishing her first novel, she worked in copywriting and journalism, as well as makeup and special effects.

== Career ==
Bardugo's debut novel, Shadow and Bone, the first book in the Grisha trilogy, was published in 2012 by Macmillan. Shadow and Bone was nominated for the Romantic Times Book Award and the South Carolina Children's Book Award, named an Indie Next List Book, and reviewed in The New York Times. The novel hit #8 on The New York Times Best Seller list, and was optioned for film by David Heyman and DreamWorks. The other books in the trilogy, Siege and Storm and Ruin and Rising, were published by Macmillan in 2013 and 2014, respectively. Bardugo defines Shadow and Bone genre as Tsarpunk—fantasy with inspiration from early-19th-century Russia.

The Six of Crows duology (Six of Crows and Crooked Kingdom) was published by Macmillan in 2015 and 2016. It is set in the same universe as the Grisha trilogy (sometimes collectively called the "Grishaverse"). Six of Crows was named a New York Times Notable Book and an ALA-YALSA Top Ten Pick of 2016. The Language of Thorns, a collection of Grisha fairy tales and folk tales, was published by Macmillan in 2017.

Bardugo then wrote the first book in the DC Icons series, which are novelizations of DC Comics' biggest superheroes; her novel, Wonder Woman: Warbringer, was published by Penguin Random House in 2017.

In 2019, Bardugo's first adult novel, Ninth House, was published by Flatiron Books. It won the 2019 Goodreads Choice Award for best fantasy novel. The book is the first in the Alex Stern series. In January 2023, Bardugo published the sequel, Hell Bent. Both books received starred reviews from Kirkus Reviews.

Bardugo also has essays and short stories in anthology collections such as Last Night, A Superhero Saved My Life, Slasher Girls and Monster Boys, and Summer Days and Summer Nights. Her books have been translated into 22 languages and published in over 50 countries.

Bardugo appeared on a Grishaverse panel alongside showrunner Heisserer at New York Comic Con in October 2020. She was ranked the sixth most popular author between 2016 and 2021 on Goodreads.

In 2023, she reached a multi-book deal with Macmillan Publishers. She signed with WME agency. She picketed for the Writers Guild of America.

In April 2024, Bardugo's novel The Familiar was published by Flatiron Books. The Familiar is a historical fantasy set in Spain during the Spanish Golden Age. The novel received a starred review from Kirkus Reviews: "Lush, gorgeous, precise language and propulsive plotting sweep readers into a story as intelligent as it is atmospheric."

The third and final book in the Alex Stern series/Ninth House trilogy, Dead Beat, was released on September 15, 2026. "Sharp writing, vivid characters, and puzzle box plotting bring the trilogy to a ringing conclusion."—Kirkus Reviews (starred review)

== Adaptations ==
In September 2012, DreamWorks acquired the movie rights to Shadow and Bone with David Heyman and Jeffrey Clifford producing, but the project was not realized. In January 2019, Netflix ordered an eight-episode series based on the Shadow and Bone and Six of Crows book series. Bardugo made a cameo appearance in episode three of Shadow and Bone.

In October 2019, Amazon Studios announced that it would adapt Ninth House. Bardugo is set to executive produce the project alongside Pouya Shahbazian.

== Personal life ==
In the acknowledgments section of Six of Crows, Bardugo reveals she has osteonecrosis and sometimes needs to use a cane; this was a source of inspiration for one of the story's six protagonists, master thief and gang boss Kaz Brekker, who uses a cane.

Bardugo was a singer in the band Captain Automatic from 2006 to 2007.

In 2022, she eloped with her partner of four years.

Bardugo is a secular Jew.

== Bibliography ==
=== The Grishaverse ===
==== Shadow and Bone trilogy ====
- Shadow and Bone (2012)
- Siege and Storm (2013)
- Ruin and Rising (2014)

==== Six of Crows duology ====
- Six of Crows (2015)
- Crooked Kingdom (2016)

==== King of Scars duology ====
- King of Scars (2019)
- Rule of Wolves (2021)

==== Companion books ====
- The Language of Thorns (illustrated by Sara Kipin) (2017)
- The Lives of Saints (illustrated by Daniel J. Zollinger) (2020)
- Demon in the Wood: A Shadow and Bone Graphic Novel (illustrated by Dani Pendergast) (2022)
- A Darker Shore: Letters from Ketterdam (illustrated by E.K. Belsher) (2026)

=== Other titles ===
Alex Stern series/Ninth House trilogy

- Ninth House (2019)
- Hell Bent (2023)
- Dead Beat (2026)

Standalones

- Wonder Woman: Warbringer (2017)
- The Familiar (2024)
- The Invisible Parade (illustrated by John Picacio) (2025)
- Better Pets (illustrated by Liz Climo) (2026)

Comics

- Wonder Woman: Warbringer (2020)

Essays

- "We Are Not Amazons" from Last Night a Superhero Saved My Life anthology (2016)

Short stories

- "The Witch of Duva" (2012)
- "The Tailor" (2013)
- "The Too-Clever Fox" (2013)
- "Little Knife" (2014)
- "The Demon in the Wood: A Darkling Prequel Story" (2015)
- "Verse Chorus Verse" in Slasher Girls & Monster Boys, edited by April Genevieve Tucholke (2015)
- "Head, Scales, Tongue, and Tail" in Summer Days and Summer Nights, edited by Stephanie Perkins (2016)
- "Ayama and the Thorn Wood" (2017)
- "The Soldier Prince" (2017)
- "When Water Sang Fire" (2017)
- "The Disappearance" in Marple: Twelve New Stories (2022)

"The Witch of Duva", "The Too-Clever Fox", and "Little Knife" were later released as a set called Folktales from Ravka in 2015. 2017's The Language of Thorns collected all the short stories except "The Tailor" and "The Demon in the Wood".

==== Anthologies ====
- Charles Yu; John Joseph Adams, eds. (2017). "Head, Scales, Tongue, and Tail". The Best American Science Fiction and Fantasy 2017. Mariner Books. ISBN 9780544973985.

=== Critical studies and reviews of Bardugo's work ===
Ninth House

- West, Michelle (July–August 2020). "Musing on Books". F&SF. 139 (1&2): 88‒94. Archived from the original on July 18, 2020.

== Awards and nominations ==
Awards Bardugo has received include the following:

Year	Title	Award	Category	Result	Ref
2012	Shadow and Bone	Goodreads Choice Award	Best Young Adult Fantasy and Science Fiction	Nominated	
2013	Siege and Storm	Goodreads Choice Award	Best Young Adult Fantasy and Science Fiction	Nominated	
2014	Ruin and Rising	Goodreads Choice Award	Best Young Adult Fantasy and Science Fiction	Nominated	
2015	Six of Crows	Goodreads Choice Award	Best Young Adult Fantasy and Science Fiction	Nominated	
2016	Six of Crows	Dragon Awards	Best Young Adult / Middle Grade Novel	Nominated	
2016	Crooked Kingdom	Goodreads Choice Award	Best Young Adult Fantasy and Science Fiction	Nominated	
2017	Crooked Kingdom	Locus Award	Best Young Adult Book	Nominated	
2017	The Language of Thorns	Goodreads Choice Award	Best Young Adult Fantasy and Science Fiction	Nominated	
2018	Six of Crows	German Fantasy Awards	Best International Novel	Won	
2019	King of Scars	Goodreads Choice Award	Best Young Adult Fantasy and Science Fiction	Nominated	
2019	—	Inkpot Award	—	Won	
2019	Ninth House	Goodreads Choice Award	Best Fantasy	Won	
2019	Ninth House	Shirley Jackson Award	Best Novel	Nominated	
2020	Ninth House	Audie Award	Best Fantasy	Nominated	
2020	Ninth House	Dragon Awards	Fantasy Novel	Nominated	
2020	Ninth House	Locus Award	Best Fantasy Novel	Nominated	
2020	King of Scars	Locus Award	Best Young Adult Book	Nominated	
2021	Rule of Wolves	Goodreads Choice Award	Best Young Adult Fantasy and Science Fiction	Won	
2023	Hell Bent	Goodreads Choice Award	Best Fantasy	Won	
2026	The Invisible Parade	Hugo Award	Best Graphic Story or Comic	Nominated	

=== Accolades ===
Year-end lists
Year	Publication	Work	Category	Result	Ref
2019	Amazon	Ninth House	Amazon's Best Books of 2019 List	18	
2019	Book Riot	Ninth House	The best books of 2019	—N/a	
2021	Book Riot	Rule of Wolves	Top Books of 2021	—N/a	
2015	Bustle	Six of Crows	The 25 Best YA Books Of 2015	16	
2016	Bustle	Crooked Kingdom	The 30 Best YA Books Of 2016	—N/a	
2013	BuzzFeed	Siege and Storm	The 21 Best YA Books Of 2013	14	
2014	BuzzFeed	Ruin and Rising	The 17 Best YA Books of 2014	7	
2015	BuzzFeed	Six of Crows	16 of the Best YA Books of 2015	7	
2015	BuzzFeed	Six of Crows	The 32 Best Fantasy Books of 2015	8	
2019	BuzzFeed	King of Scars	31 Young Adult Books That We Deemed the Best of 2019	2	
2016	Entertainment Weekly	Crooked Kingdom	YA Books of 2016	6	
2014	The Guardian	Ruin and Rising	What are the best children's books of 2014?	—N/a	
2015	The Independent	Six of Crows	10 best fantasy novels	3	
2016	The Irish Times	Six of Crows	Our favourite children's and YA books of 2016	—N/a	
2021	Kobo	Rule of Wolves	Our top 20 Kids & Young Adult picks of 2021	—N/a	
2015	New York Times	Six of Crows	Notable Children's Books of 2015	—N/a	
2019	NPR	Ninth House	NPR's Favorite Books of 2019	—N/a	
2019	Parade	Ninth House	The 25 Best Books of 2019	—N/a	
2015	Paste	Six of Crows	The 30 Best Young Adult Books of 2015	25	
2016	Paste	Crooked Kingdom	The Best Books of 2016: Young Adult	23	
2019	Paste	Ninth House	The 19 Best Novels of 2019	9	
2019	Paste	Ninth House	The Top 19 Best Audiobooks of 2019	—N/a	
2015	PopSugar	Six of Crows	The Best YA Books of 2015	3	
2016	PopSugar	Crooked Kingdom	The Best YA Books of 2016	21	
2017	Seventeen	Wonder Woman	28 of the Best YA Books of 2017	24	
2019	ShortList	Six of Crows	Best Young Adult books: great YA books to read today	3	
2019	Time	Ninth House	The 100 Must Read Books of 2019	—N/a	
2019	Tor	Ninth House	The Best Books of 2019	—N/a	
2021	Tor	Rule of Wolves	The Best Books of 2021	—N/a	
2019	USA Today	Ninth House	Best books of 2019	—N/a	
2019	Vox	Ninth House	Best of 2019: the 15 best books we read this year	—N/a	
2015	The Wall Street Journal	Six of Crows	Best of the Best-of Lists: Best Young Adult	—N/a	
2021	Wired	Six of Crows	36 of the best fantasy books everyone should read	—N/a	

Decade lists
Year	Publication	Work	Category	Result	Ref
2019	Comic Years	Shadow and Bone series	The Top 10 Fantasy Series Published in the Past Decade	8	
2019	Paste	Six of Crows	The 30 Best Fantasy Novels of the 2010s	14	
2019	Paste	Six of Crows	The 30 Best Young Adult Novels of the 2010s	18	

All-time lists
Year	Publication	Work	Category	Result	Ref
2018	Paste	Crooked Kingdom	The 50 Best Fantasy Books of the 21st Century (So Far)	38	
2018	Paste	Six of Crows	The 50 Best Fantasy Books of the 21st Century (So Far)	15	
2020	Polygon	Wonder Woman: Warbringer	The greatest Wonder Woman comics of all time	—N/a	
2020	Time	Six of Crows	100 Best Fantasy Books of All Time	—N/a	
