= Helmut W. Pesch =

German author, illustrator, translator and editor (born 1952)

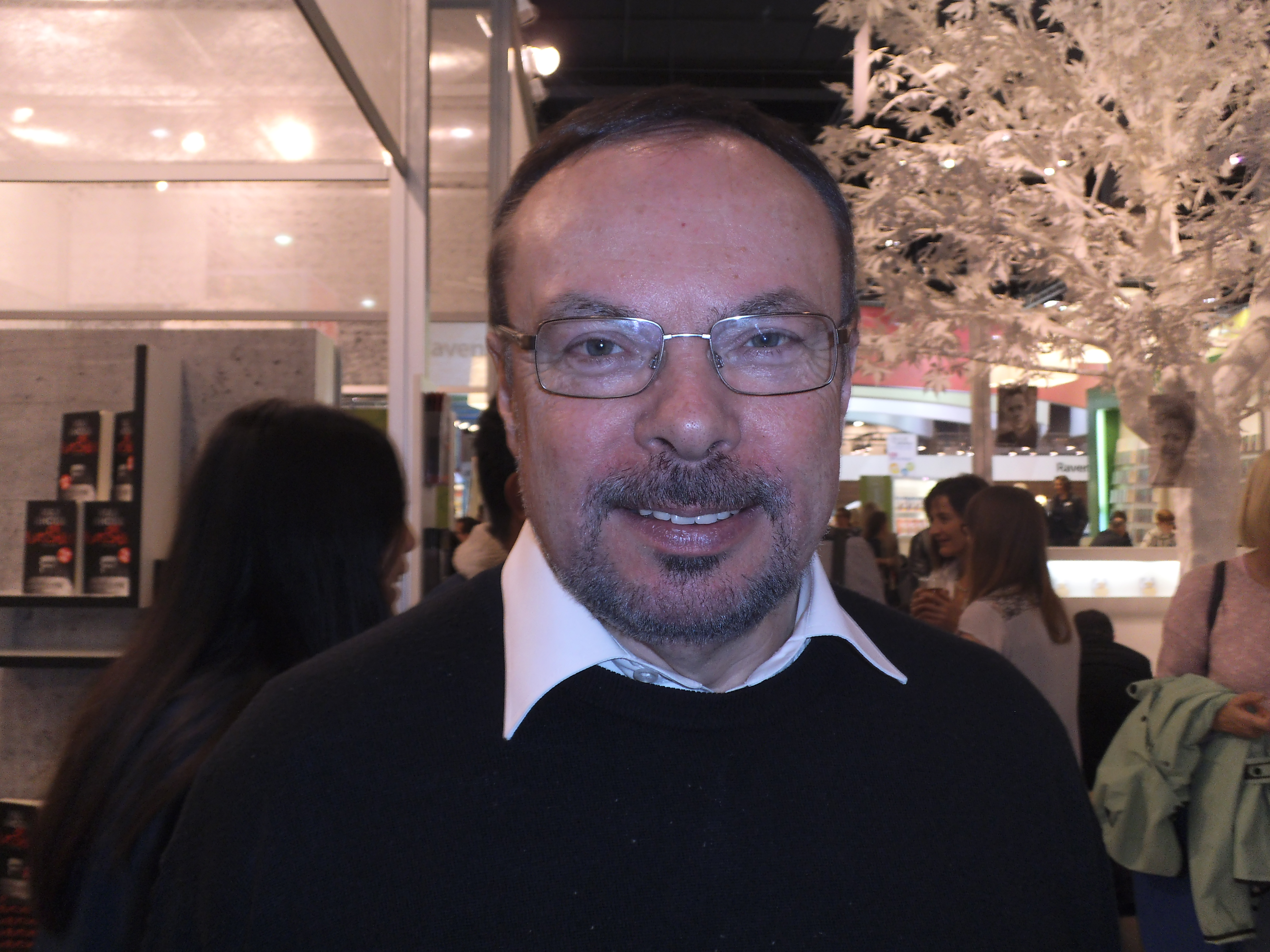
Helmut W. Pesch at the Frankfurt Book Fair, 2015

Helmut W. Pesch (born 30 August 1952) is a German fantasy author, illustrator, translator, and publishing editor. He is known as a Tolkien scholar. He won the Deutscher Fantasy Preis in 1982.

== Early life ==
Helmut W. Pesch was born in 1952. He grew up in Kevelaer on the Lower Rhine, after graduating from high school, he studied English, Art History and Classical Archaeology at the University of Cologne and the University of Glasgow. In 1981 he earned his PhD on the subject "Fantasy: Theory and history of a literary genre". Published in 1982, it was the first study in Germany on fantasy literature. Pesch was awarded the German Fantasy Prize for this in 1982. He is active as an illustrator and cartographer or translator (from English) and as a literary critic and linguist. From 1987 he also worked as a publishing editor for fiction at the Verlagsgruppe Lübbe and had been an editor for digital media at Bastei Entertainment since October 2011, where he was program manager from 2013 until his retirement in September 2015, initially at Bastei Entertainment and from 2014 in the newly founded Content Management department, which deals with material development and crossmedia projects.

Pesch writes that he research interests are fantasy, genre theory, and Tolkien studies. In 1984 he published an anthology for students titled J. R. R. Tolkien, der Mythenschöpfer ("J. R. R. Tolkien: The Mythmaker"); he followed this in 1994 with a volume of his own essays and lectures, Das Licht von Mittelerde ("The Light of Middle-earth").

== Illustrator, translator, editor ==
Pesch contributed cover pictures and maps to the fantasy series Dragon - Söhne von Atlantis, published by Pabel Verlag KG from 1973 to 1975. He provided the fantasy series Mythor, published by Pabel-Moewig Verlag from 1980, with illustrations and maps. His maps have been used in German editions of the novels of the fantasy author David Eddings.

From 1984, Pesch translated novels by authors including Lloyd Alexander, James Branch Cabell, E. R. Eddison, Brian Lumley, Dennis L. McKiernan, Naomi Mitchison, John Myers Myers, Diana L. Paxson, Tom Shippey, J. R. R. Tolkien, Joan D. Vinge and Catherine Webb from English to German. His translation of Dennis L. McKiernan's Drachenkampf (originally Dragondoom) was nominated for the Kurd-Laßwitz-Preis 1993 and voted sixth place there.

He has edited novels by Ken Follett and David Baldacci, Stephen King, Peter Berling, Johannes K. Soyener and Wolfram zu Mondfeld, Thomas Gifford, Andreas Eschbach and Wolfgang Hohlbein.

== Writer ==
Pesch started writing in the late 1960s, and wrote some fan stories in the early 1970s. After that he worked mainly in the field of translations and theoretical work with fantasy, which inspired him to write a total of five novels, some together with Horst von Allwörden.

Pesch is considered an expert on Tolkien. In 1984 Corian-Verlag published his J. R.R. Tolkien. The Creator of Myths, a critical anthology of Tolkien's work. He is the author of articles such as J. R. R. Tolkien's Linguistic Aesthetics, Tolkien 2001. An Inventory and A World of Language. On the concept of language in J. R. R. Tolkien. He edited the German edition of Robert Foster's The Complete Guide to Middle-earth.

== Works ==
=== Novels ===
Elderland Saga

- Die Ringe der Macht. Lübbe, Bergisch Gladbach 1998, ISBN 3-404-20333-X. (with Horst von Allwörden).
- Die Herren der Zeit. Bastei-Lübbe, Bergisch Gladbach 2000, ISBN 3-404-20401-8.
- Der Ring der Zeit. Bastei-Lübbe, Bergisch Gladbach 2008, ISBN 3-404-28525-5. (Anthology).

Anderswelt Trilogy

- Die Kinder der Nibelungen. Ueberreuter, Wien 1998, ISBN 3-8000-2763-1.
- Die Kinder von Erin. Ueberreuter, Wien 1999, ISBN 3-8000-2561-2.
- Die Kinder von Avalon. Ueberreuter, Wien 2001, ISBN 3-8000-2763-1.

=== Non-fiction ===
- Fantasy. Theorie und Geschichte einer literarischen Gattung. Forchheim/Passau 1982, ISBN 3-924443-00-9.
- J. R. R. Tolkien, der Mythenschöpfer. Corian-Verlag, Meitingen 1984, ISBN 3-89048-205-8.
- Das Licht von Mittelerde. (= Tolkiana. Volume 1). Passau 1994, ISBN 3-924443-90-4.
- Elbisch – Grammatik, Schrift und Wörterbuch der Elben-Sprache J.R.R. Tolkiens. Bastei-Lübbe, Bergisch Gladbach 2003, ISBN 3-404-20476-X.
- Elbisch – Lern und Übungsbuch der Elben-Sprache J.R.R. Tolkiens. Bastei-Lübbe, Bergisch Gladbach 2004, ISBN 3-404-20498-0.
- Das grosse Elbischbuch – Grammatik, Schrift und Wörterbuch der Elben-Sprache J.R.R. Tolkiens mit Anhängen zu den Sprachen der Zwerge und Orks. Bastei-Lübbe, Bergisch Gladbach 2009, ISBN 978-3-404-28524-2.

=== Translations ===
- Michael Green: Das kleine Tolkien-Buch. Ars-Ed., München 2002, ISBN 3-7607-3109-0. (A Tolkien Treasury)
- Lloyd Alexander: Der Findling und andere Geschichten aus Prydain. Bastei Lübbe, Bergisch Gladbach 2003, ISBN 3-404-20475-1. (Taran.)
- Brian Simmons: Ein Mini-Lexikon zu 'Herr der Ringe'. Ars-Ed., München 2003, ISBN 3-7607-3115-5. (The brother Hildebrandt’s Lord of the Rings)
- Bob Marshall-Andrews: Der Palast der Weisheit. Aufbau-Taschenbuch-Verlag, Berlin 2004, ISBN 3-7466-2086-4. (The Palace of Wisdom)
- Tom Shippey: Der Weg nach Mittelerde. Wie J.R.R. Tolkien „Der Herr der Ringe“ schuf. Klett-Cotta, Stuttgart 2008, ISBN 978-3-608-93601-8. (The Road to Middle-earth)
- Catherine Webb: Die Lucifer-Chroniken. Two novels in one volume. Bastei Lübbe, Köln 2011, ISBN 978-3-404-20628-5.
- Dennis L. McKiernan: Die Zwergen-Saga. Band 1: Zwergenkrieger. Weltbild, Augsburg 2012, ISBN 978-3-86365-500-6. (Dragondoom).
- Robert Foster: Das große Mittelerde-Lexikon. Bastei Lübbe, Bergisch Gladbach 2012, ISBN 978-3-404-20453-3. (The Complete Guide to Middle-earth)
- Wendy Alec: Sohn der Verdammnis. Die Chronik der Erzengel. Bastei Lübbe, Köln 2013, ISBN 978-3-404-20700-8. (Chronicles of Brothers 3: Son of Perdition)
- Eric Rücker Eddison: Der Wurm Ouroboros. Bastei-Verlag, Bergisch Gladbach 1997, ISBN 3-404-20319-4. (The Worm Ouroboros)
- J. R. R. Tolkien: Die Kinder Húrins. (with Hans J. Schütz). Klett-Cotta, Stuttgart 2012, ISBN 978-3-608-96041-9. (The Children of Húrin)
- J. R. R. Tolkien: Beren und Lúthien. (with Hans-Ulrich Möhring). Klett-Cotta, Stuttgart 2017, ISBN 978-3-608-96165-2. (Beren and Lúthien)
- J. R. R. Tolkien: Der Fall von Gondolin. Klett-Cotta, Stuttgart 2018, ISBN 978-3-608-96378-6. (The Fall of Gondolin)
