= List of Harvey Beaks episodes =

Harvey Beaks is an American animated television series created by C. H. Greenblatt for Nickelodeon that first aired on March 28, 2015.

The series focuses on Harvey Beaks, a young, friendly bird, and his two best friends, the rambunctious twins Fee, and Foo. Together, the trio seeks adventure and mischief in Littlebark Grove, a magical forest that they call home.

On June 21, 2015, Harvey Beaks was renewed for a second and final season by Nickelodeon and it premiered on June 13, 2016.

On March 1, 2017, the show moved to the sister network Nicktoons.

During the course of the series, 52 episodes of Harvey Beaks aired over two seasons.

== Series overview ==
Season	Segments	Episodes		Originally released		
Season	Segments	Episodes		First released	Last released	Network
Pilot				Unaired		N/A
1	52	26		March 28, 2015	June 10, 2016	Nickelodeon
2	16	26 (Note: 45 segments total)	11	June 13, 2016	December 9, 2016	Nickelodeon
2	29	26	15	March 1, 2017	December 29, 2017	Nicktoons

== Episodes ==
=== Pilot ===
Title	Written and directed by	Original release date	Original release date	Prod. code
"Bad Seeds"	C. H. Greenblatt	2013 (original); July 23, 2016 (Online)	Unaired	001
The pilot begins with Fee and Foo going over to meet Harvey at his house, and inviting him over to Wetbark Lake. In order to have an awesome time at the lake, Harvey has to do the one thing that's the hardest for him–get in really big trouble. In this episode, Harvey notices when he goes into the lake with Fee and Foo, he does not get to go flying in the air with his friends. Harvey also finds out that Fee and Foo are banned from the lake. Harvey wants to learn how to be trouble so he can be banned from the lake. And in the end, Harvey gets banned from the lake with the help of his friends. Note 1: Unlike the TV series, this episode was originally animated in Toon Boom Harmony by Mercury Filmworks, a Canadian animation studio responsible for animating Disney Channel and Disney XD shows like Wander Over Yonder and Star vs. the Forces of Evil. Note 2: Technobear was originally an adult character voiced by C. H. Greenblatt, but in the TV series, he's a kid voiced by Mason Vaughn.

=== Season 1 (2015–16) ===
No.	Title	Directed by	Written by	Storyboard by	Original release date	Prod. code	US viewers (millions)
1a	"Pe-Choo!"	Gary Conrad (animation)	C. H. Greenblatt	C. H. Greenblatt	March 28, 2015	101a	2.58
To have an awesome time at the lake, Harvey has to do the one thing that's the hardest for him: get in really big trouble.
1b	"The Spitting Tree"	Michelle Bryan (animation)	Kevin A. Kramer, Hannah Ayoubi, and Brandon B.	Hannah Ayoubi and Brandon B.	March 29, 2015	101b	1.81
The kids spit from the highest tree in Littlebark until they realize they can't get back down.
2a	"The Finger"	Gary Conrad (animation)	C. H. Greenblatt, Hannah Ayoubi, and Brandon B.	Hannah Ayoubi and Brandon B.	April 5, 2015	103a	1.23
The discovery of a giant, stone finger in the ground leads the kids on a passionate quest to find out what's attached to the rest of it.
2b	"The Negatives of Being Positively Charged"	Michelle Bryan (animation)	Shane Houghton, Charlie Gavin, and Chris Houghton	Charlie Gavin; Chris Houghton (director)	April 5, 2015	103b	1.23
When Fee and Foo become magnetized, nature seems determined to force them apart.
3a	"The Rentl Bike"	Gary Conrad (animation)	Shane Houghton, Charlie Gavin, and Chris Houghton	Charlie Gavin; Chris Houghton (director)	April 12, 2015	102a	1.44
Harvey and Foo rent a bike from a grumpy shopkeeper and learn the meaning of the phrase "Buyer Beware."
3b	"Anti-Valentine's Day"	Michelle Bryan (animation)	Dani Michaeli, Monica Ray, and Nicholas Sumida	Monica Ray and Nicholas Sumida	April 12, 2015	102b	1.44
Always excluded from Valentine's Day festivities, Fee makes up her own holiday called Anti-Valentine's Day.
4a	"Nightclub Night"	Gary Conrad (animation)	Shane Houghton, Charlie Gavin, and Chris Houghton	Charlie Gavin; Chris Houghton (director)	April 19, 2015	106a	1.54
It's all-ages night at the club and Harvey can't wait to blow everyone's minds with his rad dance moves.
4b	"The Rebel"	Michelle Bryan (animation)	Katie Mattila, Monica Ray, and Nicholas Sumida	Monica Ray and Nicholas Sumida	April 19, 2015	106b	N/A
Harvey becomes convinced that he's a rebel… even though he has no idea what being a rebel means.
5a	"Harvey's First Scar"	Gary Conrad (animation)	Shane Houghton, Zeus Cervas, and Colin Heck	Zeus Cervas and Colin Heck (directors)	April 26, 2015	107a	1.22
Envious of Fee and Foo's cool scars, Harvey asks them to give him a scar of his own. He just doesn't realize that getting hurt is part of the process.
5b	"The Nature of Nature"	Michelle Bryan (animation)	Dani Michaeli, Hannah Ayoubi, and Brandon B.	Hannah Ayoubi and Brandon B.	May 2, 2015	107b	1.35
Harvey goes on a heroic crusade to stop the spread of chaos in the forest.
6a	"A Tail of Les Squirrels"	Gary Conrad and Michelle Bryan (animation)	C. H. Greenblatt	C. H. Greenblatt; Derek Evanick and Diana Lafyatis (uncredited)	April 26, 2015	105a	1.22
Harvey, Fee and Foo find a detached tail in the woods and decide to keep it, meanwhile Fee tries the tail (that quickly makes her full of rage), Foo is kidnapped by the squirrels who demand the return of the tail to free him, Fee needs the help of Claire, Dade and Kratz for the rescue.
6b	"Someone's Stealing My Stuff"	Michelle Bryan (animation)	Dani Michaeli, Hannah Ayoubi, and Brandon B.	Hannah Ayoubi and Brandon B.	May 2, 2015	105b	1.24
Fee and Foo instantly get blamed when everyone's stuff goes missing. In order to protect his friends, Harvey searches to find the real culprit.
7a	"Comet Night?" "What Harvey, Irving and his friends did"	Michelle Bryan (animation)	Kevin A. Kramer, Zeus Cervas, and Colin Heck	Zeus Cervas and Colin Heck (directors)	May 10, 2015	104a	1.03
Harvey tries to have a magical night of bonding with his father, but everything goes horribly, horribly wrong.
7b	"Comet Night!" "What Fee, Miriam and the girls did"	Gary Conrad (animation)	Amalia Levari, Monica Ray, and Nicholas Sumida	Monica Ray and Nicholas Sumida	May 10, 2015	104b	1.03
Miriam tries to prove that she's still got excitement in her veins by taking Fee and the girls out for a wild night.
8a	"The Ghost Problem"	Gary Conrad (animation)	Amalia Levari, Charlie Gavin, and Chris Houghton	Charlie Gavin; Chris Houghton (director)	May 17, 2015	108a	1.11
Fee's prejudices against ghosts gets her into a mess of trouble with the local ghost librarian.
8b	"Princess Is Better Than You"	Michelle Bryan (animation)	Shane Houghton, Monica Ray, and Nicholas Sumida	Monica Ray and Nicholas Sumida	May 2, 2015	108b	1.35
Tired of seeing Princess unfairly win at everything, Harvey and his friends try to teach her a lesson.
9a	"The Almighty Foo"	Gary Conrad (animation)	Shane Houghton, Zeus Cervas, and Colin Heck	Zeus Cervas and Colin Heck (directors)	May 17, 2015	109a	1.11
When Foo accidentally destroys a bug village, he tries to make it up by giving them a safe, new home: Harvey's house. Note: From this point forward, Tom Robinson takes over as Foo's voice.
9b	"Old-Fashioned Dade"	Michelle Bryan (animation)	Kevin A. Kramer, Aaron Austin, Hannah Ayoubi, and Brandon B.	Aaron Austin, Hannah Ayoubi and Brandon B.	May 2, 2015	109b	1.33
Dade is thrilled to hang with Harvey at the yearly Old-Fashioned Days festival.
10a	"The Sleepover's Over"	Gary Conrad (animation)	Kevin A. Kramer, Charlie Gavin, and Chris Houghton	Charlie Gavin; Chris Houghton (director)	May 24, 2015	110a	0.92
Fee and Foo invite Harvey over for a sleepover, but there's just one problem: Harvey has NEVER made it all the way through a sleepover before.
10b	"Certified Babysitter"	Michelle Bryan (animation)	Katie Mattila, Monica Ray, and Nicholas Sumida	Monica Ray and Nicholas Sumida	May 24, 2015	110b	0.92
After earning a babysitting badge, Harvey is determined to prove he can babysit his little sister all on his own.
11a	"Fee's Haircut"	Gary Conrad (animation)	Amalia Levari, Zeus Cervas, and Colin Heck	Zeus Cervas and Colin Heck (directors)	July 18, 2015	111a	0.86
After Fee gets her first ever haircut, she has to decide what's better: looking awesome or being awesome.
11b	"Harvey's Favorite Book"	Michelle Bryan (animation)	Amalia Levari, Aaron Austin, and Hannah Ayoubi	Aaron Austin and Hannah Ayoubi	July 18, 2015	111b	0.86
Harvey feels jealous when all the kids fall in love with his favorite detective book series. Note: Jackie Slitherstein (the author of Harvey's favorite book series) is voiced by RuPaul.
12a	"Dad Band"	Gary Conrad (animation)	Dani Michaeli, Charlie Gavin, and Chris Houghton	Charlie Gavin; Chris Houghton (director)	July 25, 2015	112a	0.89
Harvey helps his father's garage band hit the big-time, but when the band's egos get out of control, it's up to Harvey to bring them back down to earth.
12b	"Foo's Panic Room"	Michelle Bryan (animation)	Kevin A. Kramer, Monica Ray, and Nicholas Sumida	Monica Ray and Nicholas Sumida	July 25, 2015	112b	0.89
Afraid that everyone wants to steal his favorite berries, Foo locks himself and the fruit away in a box.
13a	"A Day of No To-Do"	Michelle Bryan (animation)	Katie Mattila, Aaron Austin, and Hannah Ayoubi	Aaron Austin and Hannah Ayoubi	September 7, 2015	113a	0.93
When Harvey goes overboard with his new day-planner, Fee tries to show him that the best-laid plans are sometimes the least-planned ones.
13b	"Recipe for Disaster"	Gary Conrad (animation)	Shane Houghton, Charlie Gavin, and Chris Houghton	Charlie Gavin; Chris Houghton (director)	September 7, 2015	113b	0.93
Harvey enlists the help of the twins to cook a big, fancy dinner for his parents, everything goes wrong with the cooking though and Harvey needs to actually make a meal before his fathers decide to order pizza.
14a	"Randl's Scandl"	Michelle Bryan (animation)	Amalia Levari, Monica Ray, and Nicholas Sumida	Monica Ray and Nicholas Sumida	September 25, 2015	114a	1.24
When Randl decides to cut ties with his mother and rents a new one from a catalogue, Fee and Foo have to make him see how perfect she really is.
14b	"King of Pranks"	Gary Conrad (animation)	Shane Houghton, Charlie Gavin, and Chris Houghton	Charlie Gavin; Chris Houghton (director)	September 18, 2015	114b	1.83
Harvey pulls off a prank on Littlebark Grove, but by not wanting to upset anyone with the truth, he has to keep it going.
15a	"Night Maid"	Gary Conrad (animation)	Kevin A. Kramer, Madeleine Flores, and Colin Heck	Madeleine Flores; Colin Heck (director)	October 2, 2015	115a	1.43
To save Littlebark from the rising tide of trash, Harvey becomes the superhero his town needs.
15b	"Icky Chicky"	Michelle Bryan (animation)	Shane Houghton, Aaron Austin, and Hannah Ayoubi	Aaron Austin and Hannah Ayoubi	October 9, 2015	115b	1.09
Having outgrown his favorite baby toy, Harvey gives it to Foo, but letting go is harder than he thought.
16a	"Buds Before Studs"	Michelle Bryan (animation)	Amalia Levari, Monica Ray, and Nicholas Sumida	Monica Ray and Nicholas Sumida	October 16, 2015	116a	1.16
When Princess claims Foo as her boyfriend, Fee and Claire team up to undo the disaster.
16b	"Harvey Fights Kratz"	Gary Conrad (animation)	Kevin A. Kramer, Tyler Chen, and Colin Heck	Tyler Chen and Niki Yang; Colin Heck (director)	November 6, 2015	116b	1.23
After Harvey and Kratz get into a minor disagreement, they're told the only way they can remain friends is to fight it out like dudes.
17a	"Le Corn Maze... of DOOM!"	Gary Conrad (animation)	Shane Houghton, Charlie Gavin, and Chris Houghton	Charlie Gavin; Chris Houghton (director)	October 23, 2015	120a	1.07
After the kids claim that last year's Halloween festival maze wasn't at all scary, Les Squirrels make this year's maze the scariest ever.
17b	"Harvey Isn't Scary"	Michelle Bryan (animation)	Kevin A. Kramer, Monica Ray, and Nicholas Sumida	Monica Ray and Nicholas Sumida	October 23, 2015	120b	1.07
While the children follow a Halloween tradition of telling scary stories, Harvey can't seem to scare anyone with his stories.
18a	"Yampions"	Michelle Bryan (animation)	Amalia Levari, Aaron Austin, and Hannah Ayoubi	Aaron Austin and Hannah Ayoubi	November 13, 2015	117a	1.08
It's board game night at the Beaks' house. Harvey teams up with his father against his mother and the twins.
18b	"Barkball"	Gary Conrad (animation)	Carson Montgomery, Charlie Gavin, and Chris Houghton	Charlie Gavin; Chris Houghton (director)	November 20, 2015	117b	0.94
When a little league coach rejects Harvey and his friends, they're determined to prove him wrong in a winner-take-all game.
19a	"Junior Squealers"	Michelle Bryan (animation)	Kevin A. Kramer, Monica Ray, and Nicholas Sumida	Monica Ray and Nicholas Sumida	January 15, 2016	118a	1.00
Fee is the culprit of a crime-wave in Littlebark, and Harvey has to figure out if it's better to be true to the rules or to your friends.
19b	"The Storm"	Gary Conrad (animation)	Kevin A. Kramer, Tyler Chen, and Colin Heck	Tyler Chen; Colin Heck (director)	January 22, 2016	118b	1.02
Harvey is worried living outside is unsafe and insists the twins move in with him.
20a	"Steamgate"	Michelle Bryan (animation)	Shane Houghton, Aaron Austin, and Hannah Ayoubi	Aaron Austin and Hannah Ayoubi	January 29, 2016	119a	0.89
Feeling like no one in town shares his interests, Moff builds a portal to another dimension.
20b	"Yeti Ready"	Gary Conrad (animation)	Amalia Levari, Colin Heck, and Chris Pianka	Chris Pianka; Colin Heck (director)	February 5, 2016	119b	1.04
Afraid that he can't protect his family from an imaginary yeti, Irving goes to Rooter's survivalist family for help.
21a	"Terrybear"	Michelle Bryan (animation)	Kevin A. Kramer, Aaron Austin, and Hannah Ayoubi	Aaron Austin and Hannah Ayoubi	February 19, 2016	121a	1.05
Technobear is shocked to discover his real name is Terrybear. With no idea who he really is anymore, he decides to re-invent himself.
21b	"Bark Kart"	Gary Conrad (animation)	Shane Houghton, Charlie Gavin, and Chris Houghton	Charlie Gavin; Chris Houghton (director)	February 26, 2016	121b	1.04
The kids of Littlebark enter an epic go-kart race.
22a	"Wade Is Cooler Than Dade"	Michelle Bryan (animation)	Shane Houghton, Monica Ray, and Nicholas Sumida	Monica Ray and Nicholas Sumida	June 6, 2016	122a	1.35
Dade tries to change to be cool like his younger brother Wade.
22b	"King of the Castle"	Gary Conrad (animation)	Kevin A. Kramer, Colin Heck, and Chris Pianka	Chris Pianka; Colin Heck (director)	June 6, 2016	122b	1.35
The kids build an awesome castle out of garbage, but must keep Princess from knocking it down.
23a	"Foofee"	Michelle Bryan (animation)	Dani Michaeli, Aaron Austin, and Hannah Ayoubi	Aaron Austin and Hannah Ayoubi	June 7, 2016	123a	1.35
Fee and Foo have a secret language just for the two of them, but Foo feels betrayed when Fee shares it with Harvey.
23b	"Why Are You Even Friends?"	Gary Conrad (animation)	Shane Houghton, Charlie Gavin, and Chris Houghton	Charlie Gavin; Chris Houghton (director)	June 7, 2016	123b	1.35
Dade loses it when he has doubts about whether or not he and Harvey are totally best friends.
24a	"Alone"	C. H. Greenblatt; Gary Conrad (animation)	Shane Houghton and C. H. Greenblatt	C. H. Greenblatt	June 8, 2016	126a	1.47
Unable to find anyone to play with for the day, Harvey has to find a way to have fun all by himself.
24b	"Foo Shoes"	Michelle Bryan (animation)	Dani Michaeli, Charlie Gavin, and Chris Houghton	Charlie Gavin; Chris Houghton (director)	June 8, 2016	126b	1.47
Foo's handmade mud shoes become popular in Littlebark, until Les Squirrels steal his idea by making knock-offs.
25a	"The Punishment"	Gary Conrad (animation)	Kevin A. Kramer, Monica Ray, and Nicholas Sumida	Monica Ray and Nicholas Sumida	June 9, 2016	124a	1.26
Wracked with guilt over accidentally breaking a plate, Harvey tries to find a big enough punishment.
25b	"Arbor Day"	Michelle Bryan (animation)	Amalia Levari, Aaron Austin, and Hannah Ayoubi	Aaron Austin and Hannah Ayoubi	June 9, 2016	124b	1.26
Arbor Day, Piri Piri's favorite day, comes under attack from historical accuracy.
26a	"Double Digits"	Michelle Bryan (animation)	Shane Houghton, Kevin A. Kramer, Amalia Levari, Colin Heck, and Liz Climo	Liz Climo; Colin Heck (director)	June 10, 2016	125a	1.30
Harvey believes that he'll become a boring adult when he turns 10, so he tries to cancel his birthday.
26b	"Fee and Foo's First Birthday"	Gary Conrad (animation)	Dani Michaeli, Monica Ray, and Nicholas Sumida	Monica Ray and Nicholas Sumida	June 10, 2016	125b	1.30
The twins have never had a birthday, so they throw the biggest bash Littlebark has ever seen. Note: Chowder, from his TV show, makes a cameo in this episode as a guest in the party and appears at the end of the episode.

=== Season 2 (2016–17) ===
No. overall	No. in season	Title	Animation director(s)	Written by	Storyboard by	Original release date	Prod. code	US viewers (millions)
Nickelodeon
27a	1a	"The New Bugaboo"	Michelle Bryan	Kevin A. Kramer, Aaron Austin, and Hannah Ayoubi	Aaron Austin and Hannah Ayoubi	June 13, 2016	203a	1.41
Thinking his family is big enough, Harvey gives his baby sister away.
27b	1b	"The Case of the Missing Pancake"	Gary Conrad	Dani Michaeli, Ashlyn Anstee, and Anna O'Brian	Ashlyn Anstee and Anna O'Brian	June 14, 2016	203b	1.52
Harvey's grandparents are the suspects of a despicable crime: pancake theft.
28a	2a	"Kathy with a K"	Michelle Bryan	Amalia Levari, Monica Ray, and Nicholas Sumida	Monica Ray and Nicholas Sumida	June 15, 2016	204a	1.45
Harvey meets Kathy, a shy girl who loves leaves, and tries to find her some like-minded friends, but his efforts backfire.
28b	2b	"Harvey's Pet"	Gary Conrad	Shane Houghton, Chris Houghton, and Charlie Gavin	Charlie Gavin; Chris Houghton (director)	June 16, 2016	204b	1.48
Wanting to show he's responsible enough to have a pet, Harvey adopts a plant and treats it like a puppy.
29a	3a	"Fee's Pyramid"	Michelle Bryan	Amalia Levari, Ashlyn Anstee, and Anna O'Brian	Ashlyn Anstee and Anna O'Brian	June 17, 2016	205a	1.18
Fee tries to learn what it's like to be a big sister, with the help of Piri Piri's mother, so she can watch over Harvey's baby sister Michelle.
29b	3b	"Life Debt"	Gary Conrad	Shane Houghton, Aaron Austin, and Hannah Ayoubi	Aaron Austin and Hannah Ayoubi	June 20, 2016	205b	1.46
When Foo saves his life, Rooter feels he must repay the debt. Note: Starting with this episode, Rooter is voiced by Addie Chandler.
30a	4a	"The Feelings"	Michelle Bryan	Kevin A. Kramer, Monica Ray, and Nicholas Sumida	Monica Ray and Nicholas Sumida	June 21, 2016	206a	1.58
Irving sets up a demonstrative camping trip in hopes of connecting with his stone-faced father.
30b	4b	"Bag of Naughty"	Gary Conrad	Kevin A. Kramer, Chris Houghton, and Charlie Gavin	Charlie Gavin; Chris Houghton (director)	June 22, 2016	206b	1.42
When Harvey, Fee and Foo find a bag of magical fireworks, Jeremy warns them to get rid of it fast, but it's a challenge because it gives temptation to play with the fireworks.
31	5	"Steampunks"	Michelle Bryan and Gary Conrad	Shane Houghton, Aaron Austin, Hannah Ayoubi, Ashlynn Anstee, and Anna O'Brian	Aaron Austin, Hannah Ayoubi, Ashlynn Anstee, and Anna O'Brian	June 23, 2016	201	1.17
32	6	"Steampunks"	Michelle Bryan and Gary Conrad	Shane Houghton, Monica Ray, Nicholas Sumida, Chris Houghton, and Charlie Gavin	Monica Ray, Nicholas Sumida, and Charlie Gavin; Chris Houghton (director)	June 24, 2016	202	1.16
Harvey imagines himself and his friends in a magical steampunk world, but things come crashing down when Harvey is blamed for breaking a floating city. Note: This episode takes place during the first season and is the series' only 1-hour special.
33	7	"Mr. & Mrs. Borks"	Michelle Bryan and Gary Conrad	Kevin A. Kramer, Amalia Levari, Charlie Gavin, Chris Houghton, Monica Ray, and Nicholas Sumida	Charlie Gavin, Monica Ray, and Nicholas Sumida; Chris Houghton (director)	September 26, 2016	210	1.15
When Harvey's parents decide to get remarried, Fee and Harvey plan crazy bachelor and bachelorette parties before the big day.
34a	8a	"Operation Peanut Butter"	Michelle Bryan	Shane Houghton, Aaron Austin, and Hannah Ayoubi	Aaron Austin and Hannah Ayoubi	September 27, 2016	207a	1.13
Harvey leads the squirrels on a daring heist in order to help them regain their confidence as outlaws.
34b	8b	"Little Littlebark"	Gary Conrad	Kevin A. Kramer, Ashlyn Anstee, and Anna O'Brian	Ashlyn Anstee and Anna O'Brian	September 28, 2016	207b	1.28
Harvey makes doll replicas of the citizens of Littlebark and believes they have magical powers.
35a	9a	"Repo Fee"	Michelle Bryan	Dani Michaeli, Monica Ray, and Nicholas Sumida	Monica Ray and Nicholas Sumida	September 29, 2016	208a	1.07
Randl takes Fee under his wing and teaches her the family business.
35b	9b	"Stalemates"	Gary Conrad	Shane Houghton, Chris Houghton, and Charlie Gavin	Charlie Gavin; Chris Houghton (director)	September 30, 2016	208b	1.37
Fee and Foo try to prove they are the strongest folks in Littlebark by entering an arm-wrestling competition.
36	10	"Technoscare"	Michelle Bryan and Gary Conrad	Shane Houghton, Aaron Austin, Hannah Ayoubi, Ashlynn Anstee, and Anna O'Brian	Aaron Austin, Hannah Ayoubi, Ashlynn Anstee, and Anna O'Brian	October 15, 2016	213	1.29
When Technobear decides he's too cool for trick-or-treating, he's visited by three Halloween spirits that remind him of the true meaning of the holiday.
37	11	"It's Christmas, You Dorks!"	Michelle Bryan and Gary Conrad	C. H. Greenblatt, Shane Houghton, Kevin A. Kramer, Amalia Levari, and Dani Michaeli	Aaron Austin, Hannah Ayoubi, Ashlyn Anstee, Anna O'Brian, Charlie Gavin, C. H. Greenblatt, Carson Kugler, Celestino Marina, Monica Ray, Nicholas Sumida, William Reiss, Destiny Wood, and Saeid Zameniateni	December 9, 2016	215	1.49
Old Man Winter makes a musical wonderland out of Littlebark Grove.
Nicktoons
38a	12a	"Rockbark Rocks"	Michelle Bryan	Kevin A. Kramer, Ashlyn Anstee, and Anna O'Brian	Ashlyn Anstee and Anna O'Brian	March 1, 2017	212a	0.12
Harvey thinks he is ready to rock out at his first concert, but is he really ready?
38b	12b	"Ocean Promotion"	Gary Conrad	Carson Montgomery, Chris Houghton, and Tyler Chen	Tyler Chen; Chris Houghton (director)	March 1, 2017	212b	0.12
When the Lake Spirit gets a promotion, Harvey tries to convince him that Littlebark is too great of a town to leave.
39a	13a	"Jeremy: Defender of the Forest"	Michelle Bryan	Shane Houghton, Aaron Austin, and Hannah Ayoubi	Aaron Austin and Hannah Ayoubi	March 8, 2017	216a	0.14
An unspeakable evil from Jeremy's heroic past resurfaces, causing him to become a warrior once more.
39b	13b	"Princess Harvey"	Gary Conrad	Kevin A. Kramer, Ashlyn Anstee, and William Reiss	Ashlyn Anstee; William Reiss (director)	March 8, 2017	216b	0.14
When Princess becomes Harvey for the day, she fights tooth and nail to keep his loving family all to herself.
40a	14a	"The Split"	Michelle Bryan	Carson Montgomery, Monica Ray, and Nicholas Sumida	Monica Ray and Nicholas Sumida	March 15, 2017	217a	0.20
When Dade and the twins have an epic fight, Harvey is torn between the 2 warring sides.
40b	14b	"The Dade"	Gary Conrad	Shane Houghton, Charlie Gavin, and Anna O'Brian	Charlie Gavin and Anna O'Brian	March 15, 2017	217b	0.20
Dade gets a sandwich named after him and finally feels special.
41a	15a	"Secret Gordon"	Michelle Bryan	Amalia Levari, Monica Ray, and Nicholas Sumida	Monica Ray and Nicholas Sumida	March 22, 2017	214a	0.15
Harvey and Piri Piri find a secret garden, but Piri Piri wants to keep it a secret.
41b	15b	"The Unknown Comic"	Gary Conrad	Dani Michaeli, Chris Houghton, and Charlie Gavin	Charlie Gavin; Chris Houghton (director)	March 22, 2017	214b	0.15
A comic comes to Littlebark by an unknown artist. Who made it?
42a	16a	"The Blister"	Michelle Bryan	Carson Montgomery, Aaron Austin, and Hannah Ayoubi	Aaron Austin and Hannah Ayoubi	March 29, 2017 (Note: This episode was first released on Demand on December 11, 2016.)	211a	0.11
When Fee and Foo are forced to volunteer at a retirement home, Fee bonds with an old guy named Blister with an interesting life before he was put in the retirement home. Note: When this episode aired on Nicktoons UK channel, the part where Blister sprays a fire extinguisher in his face to keep from blushing was cut, on the grounds that it was a dangerous, imitable act.
42b	16b	"The Bad Seed"	Gary Conrad	Dani Michaeli, Monica Ray, and Nicholas Sumida	Monica Ray and Nicholas Sumida	March 29, 2017 (Note: This episode was first released on Demand on December 12, 2016.)	211b	0.11
After Michelle is not allowed to watch a scary movie, she still wants to watch it by any means necessary.
43a	17a	"The Ballad of Muesli and Jangles"	Michelle Bryan	Amalia Levari, Aaron Austin, and Hannah Ayoubi	Aaron Austin and Hannah Ayoubi	April 5, 2017 (Note: This episode was first released on Demand on December 9, 2016.)	209a	0.13
When Harvey and the twins are sick, Irving tells them how he met Miriam with some creative and weird improvements.
43b	17b	"Floo-id"	Gary Conrad	Shane Houghton, Ashlyn Anstee, and Anna O'Brian	Ashlyn Anstee and Anna O'Brian	April 5, 2017 (Note: This episode was first released on Demand on December 10, 2016.)	209b	0.13
After an incident, Foo becomes a stretchy guy!
44a	18a	"Hug Life"	Michelle Bryan	Carson Montgomery, Aaron Austin, and Hannah Ayoubi	Aaron Austin and Hannah Ayoubi	December 18, 2017	218a	0.10
In order to be part of Blister's Greasers gang, Harvey tries to prove himself worthy – his way.
44b	18b	"On the Fence"	Gary Conrad	Kevin A. Kramer, Charlie Gavin, and Anna O'Brian	Charlie Gavin and Anna O'Brian	December 18, 2017	218b	0.10
Upon finding a fence, Harvey devises it as a way to unite his community. However, it ends up doing the opposite.
45a	19a	"The Late Late Afternoon Show with Harvey Beaks"	Michelle Bryan	Carson Montgomery, Charlie Gavin, and Anna O'Brian	Charlie Gavin and Anna O'Brian	December 19, 2017	221a	0.13
Harvey hosts a talk show in his living room but goes off-script when learning a terrible truth.
45b	19b	"The Grunicorn"	Gary Conrad	Dani Michaeli, Aaron Austin, Celestino Marina, and Chris Pianka	Aaron Austin, Celestino Marina, and Chris Pianka	December 19, 2017	221b	0.13
The kids are on a race to find a rare magical creature and the winner is granted their heart's desire.
46a	20a	"Photo Finished"	Michelle Bryan	Jeff Trammell, Ashlyn Anstee, and Nicholas Sumida	Ashlyn Anstee; Nicholas Sumida (director)	December 20, 2017	222a	0.11
Miriam gets into a social media war to prove Harvey and Michelle are the cutest kids in Littlebark.
46b	20b	"Squashbuckling"	Michelle Bryan	Kevin A. Kramer, Wesley Fuh, and Diana Lafyatis	Wesley Fuh, Diana Lafyatis, and Alexander Santa Cruz	December 20, 2017	222b	0.11
Randl wants an old boat for scrap, but it's infested with children pretending they're pirates.
47a	21a	"Later, Dingus"	Gary Conrad	Kevin A. Kramer, Aaron Austin, and Hannah Ayoubi	Hannah Ayoubi and Aaron Austin	December 21, 2017	225a	0.08
Miriam gets a call from the nursing home Blister is from to tell Fee he died. At first, she thinks it's a joke, but when he doesn't show up on the prank, she learns it the hard way. Note 1: This is the only episode where a character dies, but off-screen. Note 2: This episode was dedicated all the deceased friends and family members of the crew of the show.
47b	21b	"Hair to Help"	Michelle Bryan	Amalia Levari and William Reiss	Ashlyn Anstee; William Reiss (director)	December 21, 2017	225b	0.08
Tara has lost her creative inspiration for hairstyling, so Piri Piri and Harvey help her to rediscover her passion.
48a	22a	"Break the Lake"	Michelle Bryan	Kevin A. Kramer, Ashlyn Anstee, and Nicholas Sumida	Ashlyn Anstee; Nicholas Sumida (director)	December 22, 2017	220a	N/A
There's a new lake spirit in town who tries her best, but she's a hot mess.
48b	22b	"The Amazing Harvey"	Gary Conrad	Steven Banks, Wesley Fuh, and Monica Ray	Wesley Fuh; Monica Ray (director)	December 22, 2017	220b	N/A
Harvey becomes a magician, but keeping the secrets behind the magic turns into a great burden.
49a	23a	"Princess Wants a Mom"	Michelle Bryan	Amalia Levari, Monica Ray, and Nicholas Sumida	Monica Ray and Nicholas Sumida	December 26, 2017	219a	N/A
Princess orders her dad to start dating again so she can have a new mom.
49b	23b	"Rage Against the Michelle"	Gary Conrad	Dani Micheali, Aaron Austin, and Hannah Ayoubi	Aaron Austin and Hannah Ayoubi	December 26, 2017	219b	N/A
Michelle wrecks Harvey's stuff, so Harvey must cope with an unfamiliar emotion.
50a	24a	"Grand Motel"	Gary Conrad	Steven Banks, Charlie Gavin, and Anna O'Brian	Charlie Gavin and Anna O'Brian	December 27, 2017	224a	N/A
When Harvey and his family check in to a motel, he gains a new life's purpose, going down the pool's water slide.
50b	24b	"Missing Harvey"	Michelle Bryan	Steven Banks, Charlie Gavin, and Anna O'Brian	Charlie Gavin and Anna O'Brian	December 27, 2017	224b	N/A
Harvey's away for one day and his friends can't cope with his absence.
51a	25a	"Leaf It to Kathy"	Gary Conrad	Amalia Levari, Hannah Ayoubi, Celestino Marina, and Chris Pianka	Hannah Ayoubi, Celestino Marina, and Chris Pianka	December 28, 2017	223a	0.19
Kathy hosts an online advice show and helps Kratz find his love.
51b	25b	"A Child's Guide to Surviving in the Wild"	Gary Conrad	Kevin A. Kramer, Ashlyn Anstee, and Nicholas Sumida	Ashlyn Anstee; Nicholas Sumida (director)	December 28, 2017	223b	0.19
The boys get lost in the woods and learn how to survive, Rooter-style.
52	26	"The End and the Beginning"	Michelle Bryan and Gary Conrad	C. H. Greenblatt, Ashlyn Anstee, and Nicholas Sumida	Ashlyn Anstee; Nicholas Sumida (director)	December 29, 2017	226	N/A
Fee and Foo are reunited with their parents, but their lives and their friendship with Harvey will change forever. Note: This is the series finale.
