= Carl Amery =

German writer and environmental activist

Carl Amery (9 April 1922 – 24 May 2005), the pen name of Christian Anton Mayer, was a German writer and environmental activist. Born in Munich, he studied at the Ludwig-Maximilians-Universität München (LMU). He was a participant of Gruppe 47. He died in Munich.

Amery won the Deutscher Fantasy Preis in 1996.

== Personal life ==
Son of art historian Anton Mayer-Pfannholz, in his childhood he predominantly lived in Passau and Freising. At Passau, he attended the Humanistisches Gymnasium Passau, at Freising the Dom-Gymnasium. Both cities left traces in his work. Passau appears in his novels Der Wettbewerb and Der Untergang der Stadt Passau. Freising appears in his novel Das Geheimnis der Krypta. He was a scholarship student of Stiftung Maximilianeum and studied Philology at the Ludwig-Maximilians-Universität München (LMU) and at the Catholic University of America.

He was drafted into the army in 1941. In 1943, he became a prisoner of war in the Tunisian campaign. He returned to Munich in 1946 and resumed his studies in linguistics and literary criticism. He began to write, starting with short stories under the name Chris Mayer. Then he chose the pseudonymous Carl Amery, Amery being an anagram of Mayer.

He died of emphysema on May 24, 2005, and was buried at Ostfriedhof (Munich) May 30, 2005.

== Work ==
In 1954, Amery's first novel Der Wettbewerb was published. In 1958, now a member of the writers' association Gruppe 47, his novel Die große Deutschlandtour established his reputation as a satirist.

In 1963 his publications Die Kapitulation oder Deutscher Katholizismus heute and Das Ende der Vorsehung. Die gnadenlosen Folgen des Christentums revealed another side of his work. He allotted the global ecocide to Christianity and that predestined him as thought leader of political ecology. Further publications, particularly Die ökologische Chance, and his personal engagement emphasised this leadership. He was an early member of Alliance 90/The Greens, and in 1980 founded the independent E. F. Schumacher society.

From 1967 to 1971, he was the director of the Munich Municipal Library Münchner Stadtbibliothek.

In 1974, he turned to science fiction and fantasy. For a "high literature" author this was an unusual step, influenced in particular by G. K. Chesterton. His SF novels were Das Königsprojekt (1974), Der Untergang der Stadt Passau (1975) and An den Feuern der Leyermark (1979). In the view of the scholar of German environmental literature, Axel Goodbody, Der Untergang der Stadt Passau skilfully dramatises ecology through the medium of science fiction.

Two further novels address fantasy and Bavarian spirituality: Die Wallfahrer (1986) and Das Geheimnis der Krypta (1990). Goodbody comments that these have a more complex structure than his earlier science fiction, and are more elaborately intertextual. In his view, Amery's "entertaining use of the mechanism of time travel, his play with fiction and historical reality, his colourful juxtaposition of competing genre forms and linguistic registers, and his idiosyncratic use of metaphor, allusion and quotation belie a deeply serious underlying message." In Das Geheimnis der Krypta, as in An den Feuern der Leyermark or Das Königsprojekt, Amery, like e.g. L. Neil Smith, discussed the effect of minor changes in specific historic circumstances on changing overall history.

He won the Deutscher Fantasy Preis in 1996.

From 1985 onwards his collected works were published as single releases by List Verlag of Munich. In 2001 Amery stated in an interview that he would not publish any further novels for health reasons.

== Novels and short stories ==
Title	Year
Der Wettbewerb	1954
Die große deutsche Tour	1958
Das Königsprojekt	1974
Der Untergang der Stadt Passau	1975
An den Feuern der Leyermark	1979
Im Namen Allahs des Allbarmherzigen	1981
Nur einen Sommer gönnt Ihr Gewaltigen	1985
Die starke Position oder Ganz normale MAMUS	1985
Die Wallfahrer	1986
Das Geheimnis der Krypta	1990

== Essays ==
Title	Year
Die Kapitulation; oder, Deutscher Katholizismus heute (English: Capitulation: an Analysis of Contemporary Catholicism)	1963 (English: 1967)
Fragen an Welt und Kirche. 12 Essays	1967
Das Ende der Vorsehung. Die gnadenlosen Folgen des Christentums	1972
Natur als Politik. Die ökologische Chance des Menschen.	1976
G. K. Chesterton oder der Kampf gegen die Kälte	1981
Leb wohl, geliebtes Volk der Bayern	1982
Die ökologische Chance	1985
Das ökologische Problem als Kulturauftrag	1988
Hitler als Vorläufer. Auschwitz – der Beginn des 21. Jahrhunderts?	1998

== Sources ==
- Furness, Raymond; Humble, Malcolm (1991). "Carl Amery". A Companion to Twentieth Century German Literature. London and New York: Routledge. ISBN 0-415-01987-7.
