= The Royal Project =

The Royal Project may refer to:

- The Royal Project (Thailand), a nonprofit organisation founded in 1969
- Das Königsprojekt, a 1974 German science fiction novel
