= The Familiar (Bardugo novel) =

2024 novel by Leigh Bardugo

- Author: Leigh Bardugo
- Cover artist: Keith Hayes
- Language: English
- Genre: Historical fantasy
- Set in: 16th century Madrid
- Publisher: Flatiron Books
- Publication date: April 4, 2024
- Publication place: United States
- Media type: Print
- Pages: 400
- ISBN: 9781250884251
- OCLC: 1405924859

The Familiar is a historical fantasy novel written by Leigh Bardugo, published by Flatiron Books on April 9, 2024. The novel follows Luzia Cotado, a scullion with a gift for "little miracles", who must use her magic to survive and gain favor in the royal court all while hiding the truth about her ancestry. The book is not part of a series.

== Background ==
The novel is set in late 16th century Madrid and inspired by Leigh Bardugo's family history. According to her, many of her Sephardic Jewish ancestors were expelled from Spain in 1492. However, some remained and converted to Christianity. Writing the novel allowed Bardugo to revive that side of her family tree. She described feeling connected to said relatives while writing at night.

Bardugo worked with Robin Kello, a PhD candidate at UCLA, to research the period.

== Synopsis ==
Luzia is a scullion of Jewish origin working for Doña Valentina and Don Marius Ordoño in late 16th century Madrid – the Spanish Golden Age. After some peculiar accidents Valentina soon discovers that Luzia can perform small miracles and demands that Luzia reenacts those while her friends are over for dinner as some form of entertainment. Eventually, that one performance leads to more performances until Luzia’s aunt Hualit cautions her to not attract the attention of the Inquisition. The connection between Luzia and Hualit is a well-kept secret. In public, Hualit goes by the name Catalina de Castro de Oro, and is widely known as the mistress to "the luckiest man in Spain," Víctor de Paredes.

In due course, the performances attract the attention of a spy for Antonio Pérez, and Víctor de Paredes comes looking for her. Antonio is the former secretary to the king and wishes to regain the king’s favour by bringing forth a champion in the Torneo Secreto, a competition to become the holy magic user who may serve the king. De Paredes intends to train Luzia to be said champion with the help of his servant Guillén Santángel. After agreeing to participate in the Torneo Secreto, Luzia begins her training with Santángel to learn how to use as well as control her magic, and Hualit also decides to help her. Even though initially opposed to the idea, Luzia finds herself wanting to win the Torneo and believing that she can. So, Santángel explains to her that the competition will consist of three trials – the demonstration of proof, the proof of purity and the proof of power, with the last of the three trials taking place in front of the king.

Soon, Luzia and the others go to Pérez's home La Casilla for the first of the three trials. There, she encounters three other competitors. Teoda Halcó, also known as the ‘Holy Child’, is a young girl who is able to perceive visions with which she can predict the future; Gracia de Valera, also known as ‘The Beauty’, is a gorgeous woman who is rumoured to have magic which allows her to speak to the dead; Fortún Donadei, known as the ‘Prince of Olives’, is the son of an olive farmer who can evoke magic when he plays music. Luzia is starting to become known as ‘La Hermanita’.

During the first trial, Gracia appears to be some sort of fraud, but the other two competitors seem to be quite impressive. Once it’s Luzia’s turn, she creates a grand spectacle of the constellation that Pérez was born under, which he interprets as a symbol of his future being tightly bound with that of the king and queen.

At the second trial, the Vicar of Madrid conducts a puppet show of the birth of Christ that’s meant to show the competitors powers and determine if their powers are demonic or holy. However, sometime during the show, demonic shadows take over and attack the people. Luzia saves Gracia’s life and defeats the shadows, but after that accident all the candidates are under suspicion. Gracia decides to leave the Torneo after being discovered to be a fraud. That same night, Luzia asks Santángel to tell her a story. He decides to narrate the story of a prince who lived a very fortunate life and became obsessed with wanting to live forever after seeing his father die. The prince had an incredibly loyal friend and servant, Tello, who went with him on his search for immortality. Then one day, the prince is offered a way to immortality – to give up the thing he appreciates the least and for his servant, Tello, to give up on the thing he treasures most. They both decide to agree. Afterwards, the prince is finally immortal but discovers that his luck has been passed on to Tello and that he can only survive by staying nearby Tello de Paredes as well as his descendants. He realises that this was all a setup by Tello. The next day, the Inquisition comes to take Teoda away after finding Calvinist texts in her father’s belongings, and they are convinced that the accident during the puppet show was her doing. Meanwhile, it’s revealed that Santángel's plan involves allocating his curse to Luzia. Once, Luzia wins, de Paredes will take her power and she’ll take Santángel's place, therefore freeing Santángel from the curse. The third trial arrives; however, it’s revealed that the king has sent Pérez's rival, Vázquez de Leca, in his place. Before the trial starts, De Paredes, warns Luzia that if she doesn’t impress De Leca, it’ll cost her life.

Shortly before the trial, Luzia accepts Fortún's offer to be allies. During the performance though, Fortún backstabs her by trying to one-up her by building a ship. She decides to destroy his creation, and he pushes her into the water. Before things get worse, the trial is interrupted by the news that Pérez has fled, and the king’s soldiers are arresting people. Luzia gets arrested and is sent to be questioned by the Inquisition. Her aunt, Hualit, gets killed during her attempt to leave for Venice on a coach. Meanwhile, Valentina and Marius are imprisoned, questioned, and released. Luzia ends up in a cell with Teoda, where they both decide to attempt to break out together and send a message to Teoda’s brother for help. Teoda makes it out of the prison during their escape, but Luzia is recaptured.

Meanwhile, Santángel has been kept in a small underground cage as punishment by Víctor for trying to help Luzia flee. He’s eventually released by de Paredes and brought to the Inquisition tribunal. However, during the tribunal both Luzia and Santángel both acclaim themselves to be servants of the devil to get out of Víctor's reach, even if it means death by burning at the pyre. Eventually, there is an elaborate public sentencing in Madrid. Luzia and Santángel are both meant to be burnt during it. However, once the pyre is lit, Luzia uses her magic to teleport both herself and Santángel to Valencia to start a new life. Everyone believes them to be dead, but their remains aren’t found in the ashes. The novel ends with them buying a passage to Holland and traveling together.

== Reception ==
The award-winning horror author Stephen King called the novel to be impossible to put down, while Lev Grossman called it “One of the best fantasy novels I’ve read in years”. It also received praise from NPR, Paste Magazine, Publishers Weekly, The Washington Post, and Danielle Tussoni writing for The New York Times. It received a starred review from Kirkus Reviews: "Lush, gorgeous, precise language and propulsive plotting sweep readers into a story as intelligent as it is atmospheric."

=== Awards and nominations ===
Year	Award	Result	Ref
2024	Goodreads Choice Award for Fantasy	Nominated	
2024	She Reads Best of Award for Fantasy & Magical Realism	Nominated	
2025	ALA Alex Awards	Nominated	
2025	Libby Award for Best Fantasy	Nominated	
2025	RUSA CODES Reading List for Fantasy	-	
