= The Complete Guide to Middle-earth =

Reference book for Tolkien's fictional setting

- Dust jacket of 1978 edition
- Author: Robert Foster
- Cover artist: The Brothers Hildebrandt
- Language: English
- Subject: Tolkien's legendarium
- Genre: Reference
- Publisher: Ballantine Books
- Publication date: 1978
- Publication place: United States
- Media type: Print (Hardback & Paperback)
- Pages: 573 pp
- ISBN: 0-345-44976-2 (2001 edition)
- OCLC: 48541956
- Preceded by: A Guide to Middle-earth, Mirage Press, 1971

The Complete Guide to Middle-earth: from The Hobbit to The Silmarillion is a reference book for J. R. R. Tolkien's fictional universe of Middle-earth, compiled and edited by Robert Foster. It was first published in 1971 under the title A Guide to Middle-earth. A revised and enlarged edition under the title The Complete Guide to Middle-earth was published in 1978. It received a third edition in 2001.

== Author ==
Robert Foster (b. 1949, Brooklyn) earned a Ph.D. in English and Medieval Studies at the University of Pennsylvania, and taught subsequently in the English Department at Rutgers University. Foster begun work on this in the late sixties, consulting Tolkien works and letters.

== A Guide to Middle-earth ==
The 1971 A Guide to Middle-earth was the first published encyclopedic reference book for the fictional universe of J. R. R. Tolkien's Middle-earth, compiled and edited by Robert Foster. The book was published in 1971 by Mirage Press, a specialist science fiction and fantasy publisher, in a limited edition. A paperback edition was issued by Ballantine Books in 1974.

The author profile in the first edition describes Robert Foster as the then-"Tengwar Consultant" to the Tolkien Society of America. The book incorporates material previously published in the science fiction fanzine Niekas.

== The Complete Guide to Middle-earth ==
AINUR (Q.: 'holy ones') Angelic spirits, offspring of the thought of Ilúvatar. Most of the Ainur dwell with Ilúvatar, but some, the Valar and Maiar (qq.v.), have come to Eä to fulfill the Ainulindalë. ...

— Part of the entry for "Ainur", The Complete Guide to Middle-earth

The Complete Guide to Middle-earth, published in 1978 was a major expansion of A Guide to Middle-earth, at almost twice its length, with coverage of The Silmarillion, which came out in 1977. However, as it does not include information on post-Silmarillion material (i.e. Unfinished Tales and the history of composition series The History of Middle-earth), the 1978 edition contains some assertions supported by later publications, and some that are contradicted. For example, the Star of Elendil jewel (the Elendilmir) is identified with the Star of the Dúnedain given to Samwise Gamgee, something refuted by Christopher Tolkien. On the other hand, Foster proposes that Gandalf and Olórin are one and the same; this is stated directly by Gandalf in The Two Towers.

A revised edition (ISBN 0-345-44976-2) was published in 2001, in time for Peter Jackson's The Lord of the Rings film trilogy.

A new hardback edition illustrated by Ted Nasmith, including standard and slipcased versions, was released in September 2022.

== Reception ==
Early editions of The Complete Guide to Middle-earth have been widely recognised as providing an excellent reference on Middle-earth. Lester del Rey praised the 1971 version for covering "literally everything you wanted to know about Middle Earth and were unable to discover before." Christopher Tolkien commended it in 1980 as an "admirable work of reference". in 2002, Charles W. Nelson, author of A Tolkien Bestiary, wrote that the guide was helpful for Tolkien students and enthusiasts, each new edition being a noticeable improvement over its predecessors in terms of comprehensiveness.

Dissenting, Adam Roberts, writing in The Times in 2022, calls the revised edition disappointing and "woefully outdated" in the face of the wealth of information on Tolkien now available on the Internet.

== Translations ==
A Polish edition, Encyklopedia Śródziemia, was published in 1998, and reprinted in 2002, 2003 and 2012. A German edition, Das Große Mittelerde-Lexikon, revised and translated by Helmut W. Pesch, was published in 2002.

== Sources ==
- Drout, Michael (2006). J. R. R. Tolkien Encyclopedia. Routledge. ISBN 0-415-96942-5.
- Tolkien, J. R. R. (1954). The Two Towers. The Lord of the Rings. Boston: Houghton Mifflin. OCLC 1042159111.
- Tolkien, J. R. R. (1977). Christopher Tolkien (ed.). The Silmarillion. Boston: Houghton Mifflin. ISBN 978-0-395-25730-2.
- Tolkien, J. R. R. (1980). Christopher Tolkien (ed.). Unfinished Tales. Boston: Houghton Mifflin. ISBN 978-0-395-29917-3.
