= Six of Crows =

2015 fantasy novel by Leigh Bardugo

- First edition cover
- Author: Leigh Bardugo
- Language: English
- Series: Six of Crows duology
- Genre: Fantasy, Young Adult
- Published: September 29, 2015
- Publisher: Henry Holt and Co.
- Publication place: United States
- Media type: Print (hardcover and paperback), audiobook, e-book
- Pages: 465
- ISBN: 978-1522609735
- Followed by: Crooked Kingdom

Six of Crows is a fantasy novel written by the American author Leigh Bardugo and published by Henry Holt and Co. in 2015. The story follows a thieving crew led by criminal mastermind Kaz Brekker, who plots to break into a high-security prison. The novel is primarily set in the city of Ketterdam, which is loosely inspired by Dutch Republic–era Amsterdam. The plot is told from third-person viewpoints of five (seven if the opening and closing chapters are considered) different characters.

The novel is the first of a duology, completed in Crooked Kingdom (2016). An additional novella named Six of Crows: A Darker Shore, set after the duology, was published in June 2026. The series is part of Bardugo's Grishaverse. Main character Nina Zenik's storyline continues in the King of Scars duology: King of Scars (2019) and Rule of Wolves (2021), with the other Crows making brief cameos in the latter. They are also featured in the Netflix television series Shadow and Bone (2021–2023), the series' first season giving them an original storyline, including time with characters from Shadow and Bone like Nikolai Lantsov and Genya Safin.

== Plot ==
In Ketterdam, the capital of Kerch, Councilman Hoede tests a drug called jurda parem on a Grisha Healer. The drug enhances her abilities, allowing her to control and manipulate human minds. She escapes after paralyzing Hoede and some guards, but is found dead days later.

Wealthy merchant Jan Van Eck divulges the results of Hoede's experiment to criminal prodigy Kaz Brekker and tasks him with rescuing its inventor, Bo Yul-Bayur, from the Ice Court, an unbreachable military stronghold in Fjerda, and preventing the drug's existence from being exposed to the world.

Kaz agrees for a hefty price of 30 million kruge (the currency of Kerch) and starts recruiting a crew: Inej Ghafa, his right-hand spy that he saved from a pleasure house also known as the Wraith; Nina Zenik, a Grisha Heartrender, who joins upon learning of his intention to employ Matthias Helvar, a former Fjerdan drüskelle (Grisha-hunter, in the Fjerdan language) detained at Hellgate Prison because of Nina; and Jesper Fahey, a Zemeni sharpshooter with a gambling addiction. Together, they break Matthias out of prison, who agrees to help in exchange for a pardon that would enable his reinstatement as a drüskelle. Kaz also enlists Wylan Van Eck, Jan Van Eck's runaway son, as a demolitions expert and leverage if Van Eck reneges on their deal.

As they are about to sail from Ketterdam, the crew repels an ambush by rival gangs; after torturing a gangster, Kaz learns that gang leader Pekka Rollins, the man responsible for his brother Jordie's death, is also after the scientist. Kaz explains his rescue plan to the crew: they will enter the Ice Court as prisoners, cross to the embassy sector through the roof, and disguise themselves as foreign dignitaries during a festival. After finding and freeing Yul-Bayur from the White Island, on the inner ring, they will exit from the embassy sector.

Upon reaching Fjerda, Nina and Matthias are finally able to talk about her betrayal. Nina had been a Grisha soldier captured by Matthias with his Fjerdan drüskelle party and put on a ship to Fjerda for trial and eventual execution. The ship sank during a storm, and Matthias and Nina fell in love while trying to find civilization. When they arrived at a city, Nina was questioned by Grisha spies and, to save Matthias from her compatriots, Nina reported him as a slave trader to a Kerch citizen in the harbor, unaware that Matthias would be imprisoned in Hellgate. Instead of returning to Ravka, Nina stayed in Ketterdam to try and free him. Matthias reconciles with Nina upon learning the truth, and they agree to kill Yul-Bayur, both acknowledging that jurda parem is a threat to Grisha and Fjerdans alike.

The crew intercept a cart of prisoners being taken to the Ice Court and take the place of six of them. Due to the constant feeling of bodies pressing against him, Kaz loses consciousness, and more of his past is revealed. After he and his brother were conned by Pekka Rollins, a plague had swept through Ketterdam, killing many of its residents, including Jordie. Kaz was mistakenly thought dead and tossed in the Reaper's Barge with the bodies for burning. He was only able to survive by swimming to shore using Jordie's corpse as a buoy. The experience created an intense aversion to any sort of physical contact with human skin, prompting him to wear gloves constantly.

Kaz wakes up as they enter the Ice Court and the crew is split up. Kaz goes with Nina to search the holding cells for Yul-Bayur, but he deviates from the plan and goes on his own to find Pekka Rollins in a cell. Nina is spotted by guards, who manage to raise the alarm before she can kill them. With the prison alarm triggered, their plan is ruined, so they improvise to get to the center of the Ice Court. Inej and Nina get in by taking the place of two Menagerie girls, but only Nina gets through the guards; Inej is held back. Matthias and Kaz get in through a secret bridge known only to drüskelle. Jesper and Wylan move to destroy the ringwall gate and trigger the Ice Court's alarm.

While trying to coax information from a Fjerdan official, Nina is surprised to see Jarl Brum, leader of the drüskelle and the former commander of the ship that she was held captive in. Brum lures Nina into touring prison cells specifically constructed to detain Grisha and locks her in a cell. Matthias shows up, appearing to have betrayed her, but turns against his old commander and frees Nina, making a sacred drüskelle vow to keep her safe until he dies. They look for Bo Yul-Bayur, but learn of his death. His son, Kuwei Yul-Bo, is alive and is being forced to replicate his father's research. Matthias and Nina forgo killing him, as he is only fifteen and a Grisha. They take the boy and leave, blowing up the lab as they go. They meet up with Kaz and escape through a waterfall he unearthed.

Meanwhile, Inej is spotted by her former employer Heleen van Houden, who informs the guards of Inej's true identity. Jesper and Wylan rescue her and hijack a Fjerdan tank, using it to ram through the walls and escape. They head toward the dock to rendezvous with their ship and find a large Fjerdan party waiting for them, a Heartrender using parem at the fore. With no other choice, Nina takes jurda parem and subdues the army.

The crew safely reaches Ketterdam, with Nina already suffering from withdrawals. They leave her with Wylan, while the rest of the crew take Kuwei to Jan Van Eck. Van Eck, however, reveals that he only wanted the formula for jurda parem to profit from the fallout of its release to the world. He sinks the crew's ship despite Kaz's warning that Wylan is aboard. Van Eck reveals that he deems his son unfit to inherit his business empire, as Wylan cannot read. Kaz, however, reveals that the boy Van Eck thinks is Kuwei Yul-Bo is actually Wylan, tailored by Nina to look exactly like the scientist's son. Furious, Van Eck kidnaps Inej and gives them seven days to bring him the real Kuwei. Unwilling to endanger Inej, Kaz lets the merchant go. Kaz and his remaining crew go to Pekka Rollins, revealed to have been set free by Kaz at the Ice Court, and Kaz sells his shares in the Crow Club and the Fifth Harbour to raise the money he needs. He then hatches a plan to rescue Inej and redeem the money they were promised.

== Characters ==
- Kaz Brekker, also known as Dirtyhands and the "Bastard of the Barrel", is seventeen and a master thief with a reputation for doing anything for the right price. He is second-in-command of the Dregs, and, as the mastermind of the group, the de facto leader of the Crows. He is haphephobic due to a traumatizing incident in his childhood and has a limp in his right leg from an improperly healed break. He uses a cane with a crow's head top as a mobility aid and, occasionally, as a weapon.
- Inej Ghafa is a sixteen-year-old Suli girl known as the Wraith. She is a spy for the Dregs, working directly under Kaz. She is religious, and her preferred weapons are knives, which she names after different saints. Her family was a travelling troupe and her act was tightrope walking, making her extremely agile and light-footed. She was kidnapped by slavers when she was fourteen and forced into working in a brothel before Kaz bought her.
- Wylan Van Eck is a sixteen-year-old disowned merchant's son with a penchant for chemistry and demolition. He can not read due to dyslexia, but is an excellent mathematician, chemist, and musician.
- Matthias Helvar is an eighteen-year-old former drüskelle (Grisha-hunter) from Fjerda, who is conflicted between his hatred for Grisha and his feelings for Nina. He is religious and follows Djel, the Fjerdan god.
- Nina Zenik is seventeen, and is a powerful Grisha Heartrender and former soldier and spy for the Ravkan Second Army.
- Jesper Fahey is a seventeen-year-old Zemeni sharpshooter with a gambling problem. He is a Grisha but hides it to avoid being kidnapped or killed.
- Jan Van Eck is a rich man and a prominent merchant who sits on Ketterdam's Merchant Council. He is Wylan's abusive father.
- Pekka Rollins is the leader of the Dime Lions gang and Kaz's main adversary.
- Jordie Rietveld is Kaz's older brother, enticed by promises of fortune, his greed was ultimately his demise, leading to his death.

== Reception ==
The New York Times recommended Six of Crows in their 2015 YA Crossover shortlist: "There’s conflict between morality and amorality and an appetite for sometimes grimace-inducing violence that recalls the 'Game of Thrones' series. But for every bloody exchange there are pages of crackling dialogue and sumptuous description. Bardugo dives deep into this world, with full color and sound. If you’re not careful, it’ll steal all your time." It was also included in their "7 Great Fantasy Novels for Teenagers" list.

A review by The Guardian opined that the plot was "bursting with action and overflowing with suspense right from the beginning.” It further states that the novel's "transitions between chapters and points of view were immaculate and really provided a sense of urgency and impact to the most significant scenes."

Although NPR criticized the book’s characters, claiming that they display the wisdom of adults rather than behaving and thinking like adolescents, their review also comments that the novel "has a muscle car's drive and a cast that hangs with you like they were made of magnets."

The Times of India remarked that the different perspectives in the book provide an in-depth view of each character's traits and backgrounds. The review further praises the novel, stating that "Bardugo's language and her intelligent storytelling effectively makes The Six of Crows [sic] a white-knuckle page-turner."

Six of Crows has been praised by various media outlets for its inclusivity, with characters who are racially and religiously diverse, LGBT, disabled, mentally ill and body-inclusive.

=== Accolades ===
Year-end lists
Year	Publication	Category	Result	Ref
2015	Bustle	The 25 Best YA Books Of 2015	16	
2015	BuzzFeed	16 Of The Best YA Books Of 2015	7	
2015	BuzzFeed	The 32 Best Fantasy Books Of 2015	8	
2015	The Independent	10 best fantasy novels	3	
2016	The Irish Times	Our favourite children's and YA books of 2016	—N/a	
2015	New York Times	Notable Children's Books of 2015	—N/a	
2015	Paste	The 30 Best Young Adult Books of 2015	25	
2015	PopSugar	The Best YA Books of 2015	3	
2019	ShortList	Best Young Adult books: great YA books to read today	3	
2015	The Wall Street Journal	Best of the Best-of Lists: Best Young Adult	—N/a	
2021	Wired	36 of the best fantasy books everyone should read	—N/a	

Decade lists
Year	Publication	Category	Result	Ref
2019	Paste	The 30 Best Fantasy Novels of the 2010s	14	
2019	Paste	The 30 Best Young Adult Novels of the 2010s	18	

All-time lists
Year	Publication	Category	Result	Ref
2018	Paste	The 50 Best Fantasy Books of the 21st Century (So Far)	15	
2020	Time	100 Best Fantasy Books of All Time	—N/a	

== Awards and nominations ==
The awards and nominations are as follows:

Year	Award	Category	Result	Ref
2016	Dragon Awards	Best Young Adult / Middle Grade Novel	Nominated	
2018	German Fantasy Awards	Best International Novel	Won	
2015	Goodreads Choice Awards	Best Young Adult Fantasy and Science Fiction	Nominated	
2016	El Premio El Templo de las Mil Puertas	—N/a	Won	
2017	Missouri Gateway Readers Award	—N/a	Nominated	
2017	Hea Noorteraamat	Best Youth Books	Won	
2018	Evergreen Teen Book Award	—N/a	Nominated	
2018	Rhode Island Teen Book Award	—N/a	Nominated	

== Adaptations ==
In January 2019, Netflix greenlit an eight-episode series based on Shadow and Bone (The Grisha Trilogy Book 1) and Six of Crows with Eric Heisserer as showrunner. Bardugo is also serving as an executive producer on this series. Production began in October 2019 with Freddy Carter as Kaz Brekker, Amita Suman as Inej Ghafa, Kit Young as Jesper Fahey, Danielle Galligan as Nina Zenik, and Calahan Skogman as Matthias Helvar. Wylan Van Eck did not appear in the first season but debuted in the second season, played by Jack Wolfe. The first season followed the plot of Book 1 of Shadow and Bone, incorporating the Crows with original storylines. The second season adapted elements of Crooked Kingdom and set up a future spin-off with the Ice Court Heist plotline from Six of Crows. However, Netflix cancelled this spin-off along with Shadow and Bone some time after the release of the second season. It strayed from the original storyline in the books and combined the Shadow and Bone timeline with the Six of Crows timeline.

In May 2024, the indie music artist Lilith Max released the song "Birds of a Feather", which she says was inspired by the character of Kaz Brekker.
