= The Language of Thorns =

2017 anthology by Leigh Bardugo

- Author: Leigh Bardugo
- Audio read by: Lauren Fortgang
- Illustrator: Sara Kipin
- Series: Grishaverse
- Publication date: 26 Sep 2017
- Publication place: United States
- Website: https://www.leighbardugo.com/book/the-language-of-thorns/

The Language of Thorns: Midnight Tales and Dangerous Magic is a 2017 collection of fairy tales written by the author Leigh Bardugo, set in her Grishaverse universe.

== Plot ==
=== Ayama and the Thorn Wood ===
Ayama is a young peasant girl who is treated as a servant in her own home. When the king's son is born with monstrous wolf-like features, the king hides him in a labyrinth under the palace. The monster escapes from the labyrinth, killing livestock and terrorizing villagers.

Ayama is sent as the king's emissary to the beast. In the Thorn Wood, she meets the beast and exchanges stories with him. With each story, she changes the traditional tale to suit her listener. Each time, the king rewards her, but her parents do not treat her any better. The third time she is sent to the woods, the king orders her to slay the beast and return with his heart. Ayama returns with the living beast, having drunk from the waters of the Thorn Wood to become a monster herself. She professes her love for the beast and accuses the king of framing him to distract from his own unpopularity. The king is imprisoned in the labyrinth, while Ayama and the beast become the new queen and king.

=== The Too-Clever Fox ===
Koja, an ugly but clever fox, uses his wits to escape danger. He eventually befriends the bear Ivan; however, Ivan disappears after a hunter arrives in the forest. The hunter forces his sister Sofiya to sew hides into a gruesome cloak. Koja asks Sofiya to betray her brother. Sofiya initially pretends to befriend Koja, but she drugs him and starts to skin him. She is the true hunter, and her brother is simply a distraction. The nightingale Lula pecks out Sofiya's eyes, saving Koja.

=== The Witch of Duva ===
Nadya is the daughter of Maxim, a local carpenter. Several girls go missing as winter begins and famine deepens. Nadya suspects that Karina, her father's new wife, is a witch. While hunting in the woods, Nadya finds a mysterious cabin owned by a witch named Magda. They are snowed in together for the winter; Nadya helps with the chores and learns magic. Nadya decides to return to her father and free him from Karina's influence.

Magda helps Nadya cut off two of her own fingers, using them to create a gingerbread girl. The ginger girl arrives at Maxim's house. He assaults and eats the ginger girl, revealing that Maxim is the one hunting local girls. Maxim dies and the village finds mementos of the dead girls in his house. Nadya realizes that Karina was protecting her from Maxim. Karina leaves town, and Nadya remains with Magda to learn more magic.

=== Little Knife ===
Yeva, the daughter of the duke, is the most beautiful girl in the city. The duke offers her hand in marriage to the suitor who can create the largest pile of firewood. The duke expects that a rich prince will hire a team of workers and win the contest. Semyon, an impoverished Grisha tidemaker, uses the local river to wash up a huge tower of wood, winning the contest. The duke devises a second task: return with a magic mirror from a mountain witch. The duke expects the prince to use his prized horses to reach the witch first, but the river brings Semyon to the witch first. Semyon names the river Little Knife. The witch gives the mirror to Little Knife, but Semyon takes it for himself.

The duke gives the suitors a final task: find a magical coin that is never spent. Little Knife retrieves the coin from the depths of the earth. Semyon demands to be married to Yeva before he will give the duke the coin. Little Knife refuses to give up the coin, and Yeva leaves the city with the river. Without the river, the town fades into obscurity. Yeva lives happily into old age while Semyon thirsts to death, afraid that water will once again betray him.

=== The Soldier Prince ===
Talented clocksmith Droessen is invited to the house of the Zelverhaus family, who are wealthy merchants. He plans to marry the young Clara Zelverhaus when she comes of age. He makes an enchanted nutcracker for her to win her favor.

When Clara speaks to the nutcracker, he will sometimes become a man and take her to fairyland, but he will become a nutcracker again as the journey ends. The nutcracker has memories of his time as a soldier, but they are disjointed and unclear. He is stored in a glass cabinet where he can watch Clara and her family members. This experience causes him to be confused; he does not know that he is not a real person. The Rat King, a monster from Clara's imagination, appears and tells the nutcracker about his true nature; if the nutcracker can have desires separate from Clara's, he will become human. The nutcracker realizes he wishes to see the world beyond the Zelverhaus estate.

In his human form, the nutcracker attends a party at Clara's house. That night, he is confronted by Droessen. Droessen states that he is only a toy, turning the nutcracker into wood again. Droessen attempts to burn him, but the Rat King emerges from the walls and saves the nutcracker. The nutcracker turns Droessen into a wooden toy and places him in the cabinet. He then turns and leaves the house, never to be seen again. Clara leaves to become a writer. Her mother picks up the Droessen doll and begins to speak to him.

=== When Water Sang Fire ===
Sildroher are mermaid-like creatures who use their songs to create magic. In ages past, the sildroher spend time on land disguised as humans, but now this is forbidden. The story narrates why this change occurred.

Ulla is an unpopular sildroher who is rumored to be part human. Nevertheless, her magical powers are unsurpassed by any of her classmates. She and her partner Signy are allowed to perform before the royal court; their combined voices enchant the youngest prince, Roffe, who invites them onto land with him for the season. They use magical sikkern knives to cut their tails into legs and journey onto land together.

At the end of the season, the king will abdicate, and the son who presents the best gift will take the throne. Inspired by Signy's flaming red hair, Ulla suggests that Roffe's gift should be a fire that can burn underwater. At the human court, Ulla meets a seer's apprentice. The apprentice reveals to Ulla that they are half-siblings; Ulla is the daughter of a sildroher father and a Grisha mother. The apprentice also reveals the secret of the spell for the fire: it will require a human sacrifice. Ulla is initially repelled by this, but Roffe promises to marry Signy if Ulla performs the spell.

Together the three sildroher sacrifice a human criminal, cutting his lungs from his body and using them to create an unquenchable flame. Ulla is severely burned by the spell. Roffe reveals that he used Ulla's sikkern knife to kill the human, who was not a criminal at all, but an innocent page. Roffe and Signy abandon Ulla and return to the sea. They plan to claim the spell as their own work, casting Ulla as the murderer.

An enraged Ulla calls a terrible storm, destroying both the human and sildroher palaces. Roffe and Signy still rule, but their kingdom is lessened. A monstrous Ulla continues to lurk near the lonely islands north of Fjerda, offering magical bargains to those who feel wronged.

== Background ==
The Witch of Duva was written in 2012 and is the oldest story in the collection.

The collection was published after the initial success of the Shadow and Bone trilogy and the Six of Crows duology. In an interview with the Los Angeles Times, Bardugo described the tales as "the kind of stories that the characters in the [Grishaverse] books might have heard growing up."

NPR notes that some of the stories in the collection are inspired by various traditional fairy tales. Ayama and the Thorn Wood is based on Beauty and the Beast. The Witch of Duva is "wrapped in the rags of Hansel and Gretel", while The Soldier Prince is "The Nutcracker if The Nutcracker were re-done by the writer's room at Westworld." In an interview with Grimdark Magazine, Bardugo revealed that When Water Sang Fire was inspired by both the Hans Christian Andersen version of The Little Mermaid as well as the Disney version, and the "space between those two versions of the story". In the same interview, she commented on her interpretation of fairy tales for the collection, stating "Why should love be earned through a series of impossible tasks? Why would a girl want to marry a king who had threatened to murder her if she couldn’t spin straw into gold? ... Even when we’re kids, I think we pick up on the wrongness of some of these stories, and sometimes, the impulse is to sanitize or avoid them. But that wrong, uncomfortable place is exactly where I wanted to go."

== Reception ==
A review for NPR praised the dark tone of the stories, calling them "far more Grimm than Disney" and stating that "bad [fairy tales] sing 'Careful what you wish for' and 'Sometimes pretty isn't as important as smart' with choruses of cute mice and bluebirds. But the good ones don't end before there's blood on the knife." Reviewer Jason Sheehan also notes that "All of Bardugo's stories have a coldness to them, actually, as if ... to make you remember ... that the world is a cruel place that breaks the young, the sweet and the innocent quickest of all". Adrian Collins of Grimdark Magazine noted that the collection is "written beautifully in a dark fairytale style".

School Library Journal gave the collection a starred review. In her review, Emma Carbone wrote that "themes of feminism and empowerment color each story with heroes and heroines given the chance to choose their own fates and stir the pot, for better or worse". Jessie Ulmer of the Yakima Herald-Republic called it "a lyrically and visually stunning collection". Ulmer also praised the accompanying artwork, writing that "Kipin’s illustrations start small, but soon transform into intricate designs that grow with every turn of the page, encapsulating each story in a vibrant and ever-growing border."
