= Ninth House =

2019 fantasy novel by Leigh Bardugo

- Author: Leigh Bardugo
- Audio read by: Lauren Fortgang; Michael David Axtell
- Cover artist: Keith Hayes
- Language: English
- Series: Alex Stern
- Release number: 1
- Genre: Dark fantasy; Thriller; Mystery; Horror fiction; Campus novel
- Set in: Yale University, New Haven, Connecticut
- Publisher: Flatiron Books
- Publication date: October 8, 2019
- Publication place: United States
- Media type: Print
- Pages: 458
- ISBN: 1250313074
- OCLC: 1114274185
- LC Class: PS3602.A775325 N56 2019
- Followed by: Hell Bent

Ninth House is a dark fantasy horror novel written by author Leigh Bardugo, published by Flatiron Books in October 2019. The novel follows Galaxy "Alex" Stern, a 20-year-old high school dropout and trauma survivor capable of seeing ghosts, who is surprisingly offered a full ride to Yale. Recruited into Lethe, the ninth house, she must monitor the eight secret societies that practice dangerous occult magic.

The first in a series, Ninth House was followed by a sequel titled Hell Bent, which was published in January 2023. The final book in the series, Dead Beat, was released on September 15, 2026.

== Background ==
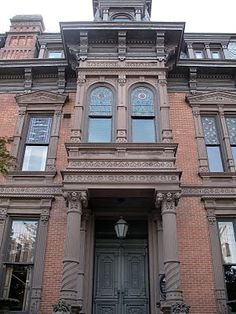
The John C. Anderson Mansion, built 1882

The novel is Bardugo's first adult novel and, beyond the fantasy elements, is largely inspired by her time at Yale University. Bardugo first became inspired upon discovering the tombs of Yale's secret societies as she walked down New Haven's Grove Street during her freshman year. When her friend sent her pictures from their time at Yale years later, Bardugo was struck with memories, both pleasant and unpleasant, which inspired her to explore trauma for this novel but also companionship through it. The "ninth house" in the novel is based on the Anderson Mansion, the real-life New Haven headquarters of the Yale secret society Shabtai.

== Reception ==
Award-winning horror author Stephen King called Ninth House "the best fantasy novel I've read in years, because it's about real people. Bardugo's imaginative reach is brilliant, and this story―full of shocks and twists―is impossible to put down." It also received endorsements from fellow authors Lev Grossman, Kelly Link, Joe Hill, and Charlaine Harris.

=== Accolades ===
Year-end lists
Year	Publication	Category	Result	Ref
2019	Amazon	Amazon's Best Books of 2019 List	18	
2019	Book Riot	The best books of 2019	—N/a	
2019	NPR	NPR's Favorite Books of 2019	—N/a	
2019	Parade	The 25 Best Books of 2019	—N/a	
2019	Paste	The 19 Best Novels of 2019	9	
2019	Paste	The Top 19 Best Audiobooks of 2019	—N/a	
2019	Time	The 100 Must Read Books of 2019	—N/a	
2019	Tor	The Best Books of 2019	—N/a	
2019	USA Today	Best books of 2019	—N/a	
2019	Vox	Best of 2019: the 15 best books we read this year	—N/a	

=== Awards and nominations ===
Year	Award	Category	Result	Ref
2019	Shirley Jackson Award	Novel	Nominated	
2020	Audie Award	Fantasy	Shortlisted	
2020	Dragon Awards	Fantasy Novel	Nominated	
2020	Goodreads Choice Awards	Fantasy	Won	
2020	Locus Award	Fantasy Novel	Finalist	

== Adaptation ==
On October 10, 2019, two days after the novel's release, it was announced Amazon Studios would adapt Ninth House as a TV series. Leigh Bardugo is set to executive produce the project alongside Pouya Shahbazian.
