= Crooked Kingdom =

2016 fantasy novel by Leigh Bardugo

- First edition cover
- Author: Leigh Bardugo
- Language: English
- Series: Six of Crows duology
- Genre: Fantasy, Young Adult
- Published: September 20, 2016
- Publisher: Henry Holt and Co.
- Publication place: United States
- Media type: Print (hardcover and paperback), audiobook, e-book
- Pages: 546
- ISBN: 9781627792134
- OCLC: 962228078
- Preceded by: Six of Crows

Crooked Kingdom is a fantasy novel written by author Leigh Bardugo, published by Henry Holt and Co. in 2016. Set in a world loosely inspired by 19th-century Europe, it takes place days after the events of the duology's first book, Six of Crows. The plot is told from the third-person viewpoints of eight characters.

Six of Crows and Crooked Kingdom are set in the Grishaverse. The Crows reappear in Rule of Wolves (2021), part of the King of Scars duology where Nina Zenik is a major point-of-view character. Leigh Bardugo has discussed the possibility of writing a third book in this series, but has not confirmed it.

On February 18, 2026, the author announced a novella set after the events of Crooked Kingdom named Six of Crows: A Darker Shore.

== Plot ==
In the prologue, a Grisha named Emil Retvenko is kidnapped by a winged Shu man.

The book begins in a gambling parlor named Club Cumulus, where Jesper and Nina keep Jan Van Eck's lawyer, Cornelis Smeet, busy while Kaz and Wylan search his office for Van Eck's property documents. Kaz then plans to kidnap Van Eck’s pregnant young wife, Alys, and trade her for Inej, who is being held captive. Meanwhile, Jesper’s father, Colm, arrives at the city, as a bank Jesper owes demands he pays his debts. When Jesper and Wylan go to meet Colm, they are attacked but manage to escape. Kaz tells Jesper's father to give them three days to get the money and asks him to wait in a hotel in the city.

Afterward, the crew's kidnapping is successful, and they trade Van Eck's wife for Inej. However, during the trade, three Shu soldiers with superhuman abilities attack Nina, Jesper, and other Grisha in the surrounding area. They manage to get away after Nina shoots one of them in the eye and Wylan sets another on fire. The crew meets at their hideout, and Kaz reveals he had bought shares in sugar companies and plans to sabotage Van Eck’s sugar silos using a chemical weevil, thereby raising the price of sugar. Nina and Inej persuade Kaz to smuggle out the remaining Grisha in the city using one of Van Eck’s ships.

While Kaz and Wylan attempt to steal the seal they need from the Van Eck house, Nina and Inej infiltrate the sugar silos. However, all of them are attacked, and it is revealed that Pekka Rollins had allied with Van Eck. Pekka also attacks the hideout Kaz was using to hide Kuwei, where Jesper and Matthias were guarding him. They all escape and meet at the hotel where Colm is staying. Nina tells the group about her strange and eerie new ability to control dead bodies; she, Wylan, and Kuwei guess that it might be a result of her surviving withdrawal from jurda parem. They also learn Van Eck had deputized all the gangs in the Barrel, leaving them with few allies and no means of escape. Kaz puts together another plan and declares an auction for the indenture of Kuwei.

During the auction the Fjerdans, Ravkans, Shu, and Zemeni bid for Kuwei. Kaz disguises the Grisha from the embassy as the Council of Tides. They claim that the auction is biased because Van Eck funded the Shu delegation. The Merchant Council believes that Van Eck had swindled them. The money was, in fact, channeled to the Crows by scamming the Merchant Council. Van Eck is arrested and his reputation destroyed. They manage to fake Kuwei's death and smuggle him out of the city with the Ravkans, where he will try to find an antidote to jurda parem. During the job, Matthias is shot by a young drüskelle and later dies. Kaz bluffs Pekka into believing that he had his son buried alive. Pekka then leaves the city in search of his son. With Van Eck gone, Wylan inherits the properties of his family. Jesper lives with Wylan and helps him handle the business but agrees that he will train with a Fabrikator to develop his power as Grisha.

In the final chapters, Kaz finds Inej's parents with the help of Sturmhond and brings them to Ketterdam. He is threatened by the real Council of Tides. Inej threatens Pekka out of his business in her first move against the people active in Ketterdam's slave trade.

== Characters ==
- Kaz Brekker, a criminal prodigy and lock pick with a reputation for doing anything for the right price. He is also known as Dirtyhands and Bastard of the Barrell. He is described as always wearing black leather gloves and carrying a cane with a crow's head on it. He is the de facto leader of the Dregs.
- Inej Ghafa, a Suli acrobat who has a talent for sneaking around. She was kidnapped as a child and forced to work in a brothel known as the "Menagerie" until Kaz bought her indenture. She is also known as the Wraith.
- Wylan van Eck, a merchant's son with some talent for demolition. He is unable to read due to severe dyslexia. He is initially engaged as a potential hostage, but later proves his worth as a valuable member of the Crows. He enters into a relationship with Jesper near the end.
- Matthias Helvar, a former Drüskelle witchhunter from Fjerda. Kaz frees Matthias from Hellgate Prison in Six of Crows because of his knowledge of the Ice Court as well as for his skills as a soldier. He has a romantic history with Nina.
- Nina Zenik, a powerful Heartrender who worked in a brothel named "White Rose". She was a soldier of the Ravkan Second Army who was captured by Fjerdan Drüskelle, leading to her first encounter with Matthias. After the events of Six of Crows, her Grisha power shifted from the ability to manipulate the human body to the ability to communicate with and control the dead.
- Jesper Fahey, a dark-skinned Zemeni sharpshooter with a gambling problem. He is described as being tall and lanky, with an intense facial bone structure. He is known for his quick wit and even quicker shooting. Near the end he enters into a relationship with Wylan.
- Colm Fahey, a Kaelish jurda farmer who set up shop in Novyi Zem. He is Jesper's father.
- Jan Van Eck, a rich and prominent merchant who sits on Ketterdam's Merchant Council. He makes a deal with Kaz Brekker to retrieve the creator of jurda parem from the Ice Court. He is also Wylan Van Eck's father.
- Kuwei Yul-Bo, the son of Bo Yul-Bayur, the creator of jurda parem. Kuwei was rescued from the Ice Court by the Dregs in Six of Crows, and brought back to Ketterdam. He is an Inferni, and is Shu.
- Pekka Rollins, leader of the Dime Lions and Kaz's main adversary. He is the rich owner of successful gambling halls and runs one of the most formidable gangs in Ketterdam.

== Reception ==
Kirkus Reviews calls the novel "dark and violent...but gut-wrenchingly genuine". It was nominated for the 2016 Goodreads Choice Awards for "Best Young Adult Fantasy & Science Fiction". This second book in the Six of Crows duology is regarded by many to be sadder and darker than its predecessor.

Year-end lists
Year	Publication	Category	Result	Ref
2016	Bustle	The 30 Best YA Books Of 2016	—N/a	
2016	Entertainment Weekly	YA Books of 2016	6	
2016	Paste	The Best Books of 2016: Young Adult	23	
2016	PopSugar	The Best YA Books of 2016	21	
