= Das Königsprojekt =

1974 novel by Carl Amery

- First edition
- Author: Carl Amery
- Language: German
- Genre: Science fiction novel
- Publisher: Piper
- Publication date: 1974
- Publication place: Germany

Das Königsprojekt (English: The Royal Project) is a German-language science fiction novel by Carl Amery, published in 1974. The book was the first of three Science Fiction novels written by Amery.

== Background ==
Amery's novel, set mostly in Rome and concerning the Vatican, reflects on his upbringing as a Bavarian Catholic who had studied at the Catholic University of America.

== Plot ==
The Vatican gains possession of a time machine from Leonardo da Vinci after the inventor's death. Selected members of the Pope's Swiss Guard are sent back in time to alter history in favour of the Catholic Church. All this is supervised by a very small group of church officials and without the specific knowledge of the current Pope.

The Vatican learns that major historical events can't be prevented, only their details can be altered. For example, the Reformation can not be undone, but the details surrounding it can be changed: Martin Luther can't be killed before publishing The Ninety-Five Theses, but the failed attempt on his life by a time-traveling agent is interpreted by Luther as a visitation by the devil.

In 1688, the Progetto Reale (English: Royal Project) is undertaken by the men in charge of the department. The project's aim is to reestablish Catholicism in England through restoration of the House of Stuart. The Catholic Church perceives the Stuarts as too weak for their purposes and instead selects the Bavarian House of Wittelsbach as an alternative. For the purpose of legalising the claim to the British throne, a member of the Swiss Guard, Arnold Füßli, is sent out to exchange the Stone of Scone for a fake. While this mission succeeds, the stone is deposited at what later becomes a reservoir and is lost for the cause.

The Church's main asset, its loyal Swiss Guard soldier Franz Defunderoll, however, chooses to desert and meet his unsuspecting self in the future.

Eventually, the time machine is destroyed.

In the finale of the book, the rebellious Bavarian-Scottish troops sacrifice themselves in the reservoir attempting to recover the Stone.

== Translations ==
- Czech by Jan Hlavička, title: Královský projekt, Ivo Železný 1997

== Editions ==
- Piper, 1974: ISBN 3-492-02074-7
- Deutscher Taschenbuchverlag, 1978:
- Heyne, 1984: ISBN 3-453-31031-4
- Süddeutsche Verlag, 1987: ISBN 3-7991-6366-2

== Sources ==
- Das Königsprojekt by Carl Amery, publisher: Heyne
- SF im Allgemeinen und Lem im Besonderen - Carl Amery: Das Königsprojekt (in German)
