= Harvey Beaks =

American television series, 2015–2017

- Genre: Comedy
- Created by: C. H. Greenblatt
- Directed by: Michelle Bryan; Gary Conrad
- Voices of: Max Charles; Angelina Wahler; Jackson Brundage; Tom Robinson
- Opening theme: "Harvey Beaks Main Title Theme"
- Composer: Ego Plum
- Country of origin: United States
- Original language: English
- No. of seasons: 2
- No. of episodes: 52 (list of episodes)

Production
- Executive producer: C. H. Greenblatt
- Producer: Joann Estoesta
- Running time: 22 minutes (two 11-minute segments)
- Production company: Nickelodeon Animation Studio

Original release
- Network: Nickelodeon
- Release: March 28, 2015 – December 9, 2016
- Network: Nicktoons
- Release: March 1 – December 29, 2017

Harvey Beaks is an American animated television series created by C. H. Greenblatt for Nickelodeon. The series premiered on Nickelodeon on March 28, 2015, and aired there until December 9, 2016, before moving to Nicktoons, where the remaining episodes were broadcast from March 1 to December 29, 2017.

== Plot ==
Set in the forest community of Littlebark Grove, the series follows Harvey, a kind-hearted young bird, and his best friends, the imp twins Fee and Foo, as they embark on adventures and cause mischief.

== Episodes ==
| Season | Segments | Episodes | | Originally released | | |
| Season | Segments | Episodes | | First released | Last released | Network |
|---|---|---|---|---|---|---|
| Pilot | | | | Unaired | | N/A |
| 1 | 52 | 26 | | March 28, 2015 | June 10, 2016 | Nickelodeon |
| 2 | 16 | 26 (Note: 45 segments total) | 11 | June 13, 2016 | December 9, 2016 | Nickelodeon |
| 2 | 29 | 26 | 15 | March 1, 2017 | December 29, 2017 | Nicktoons |

== Characters ==
=== Main ===
- Harvey (voiced by Max Charles) is a kind-hearted, cautious 10-year-old anthropomorphic bird who often struggles to step outside his comfort zone. His friendships with Fee and Foo encourage him to embrace adventure and new experiences.
- Fee (voiced by Angelina Wahler) is Harvey's adventurous best friend and Foo's twin sister. An energetic and fearless young imp, she is fiercely protective of her friends and family.
- Foo (voiced by Jackson Brundage and Tom Robinson) is Harvey's other best friend and Fee's twin brother. A carefree and optimistic imp, he shares his sister's love of adventure and mischief.
- Michelle Beaks (voiced by Kari Wahlgren) is Harvey's younger sister. Introduced as an egg before hatching in "The New Bugaboo", she develops a mischievous and energetic personality that contrasts with Harvey's more reserved nature.
- Miriam Beaks (voiced by Kerri Kenney-Silver) is Harvey's mother, a librarian whose calm demeanor contrasts with her rebellious youth
- Irving Beaks (voiced by Scott Adsit in the series and Chris Parnell in the pilot) is Harvey's shy, bespectacled father, who prefers a quiet home life and enjoys caring for his family.

=== Recurring ===
Children

- Dade (voiced by C. H. Greenblatt) is a rabbit and Harvey's longtime friend prior to his meeting Fee and Foo. Cautious and conventional, he frequently disapproves of the twins' adventurous antics.
- Claire (voiced by Nicole Wedel) is a shy fox who wears glasses. She has a crush on Foo and enjoys drawing anime-inspired artwork.
- Princess Roberts (voiced by Andres Salaff) is a spoiled owl who wears a pink dress and tiara. She is the daughter of Doctor Roberts and is accustomed to getting her own way.
- "Technobear" Snapper (voiced by Mason Vaughn) is a street-smart brown bear and fan of techno music. Although known as "Technobear", his real name is Terrybear, and he was adopted by a pair of turtles.
- Kratz (voiced by Matthew Zhang) is a neurotic skunk who has chronic bad luck and sprays when frightened or nervous. He is also a talented artist.
- Rooter Wellington (voiced by Laz Meiman in season 1 and Addie Chandler in season 2) is a tough wild boar with a mohawk and an Australian accent. An experienced outdoorsman, he enjoys challenging himself and surviving in the wilderness.
- Piri Piri (voiced by Madeleine Curry) is a yellow bird and Claire's best friend. An optimistic artist and dreamer, she often draws inspiration from her dreams.
- Mikey (voiced by Nicholas Sumida) is a soft-spoken frog and one of Harvey's friends.
- Kathy (also voiced by Nicholas Sumida) is a shy capybara with a fondness for leaves who runs a web video channel dedicated to them.

Adults

- Doctor Roberts (voiced by Matt Berry in "The Spitting Tree" and "Princess is Better Than You", and Jeff Bennett in all other appearances) is an eccentric owl, Princess' father, and one of Irving's friends. He has an interest in healing crystals and meditation.
- The Spirit of Wetbark Lake (voiced by Dwight Schultz) is a giant water spirit who watches over Wetbark Lake and expects visitors to respect it.
- Jeremy (voiced by C. H. Greenblatt) is a mushroom-like creature who works as a bartender and is a close friend of the Beaks family. He is later revealed to be the retired guardian of Littlebark Grove.
- Randl (voiced by Marc Maron) is a grouchy raccoon who owns the rental shop Randl's Rentls.
- Moff Williamson (voiced by Dave Foley) is a wingless purple moth with a passion for steampunk and one of Irving's closest friends.
- Bartleburt (voiced by Fred Stoller) is a mild-mannered tree spirit who works with Miriam at the library.
- Tara (voiced by Ana Gasteyer) is a giant spider who works as a hairdresser and is a friend of Miriam.
- Les Squirrels (voiced by André Sogliuzzo as Jean Luc and C. H. Greenblatt as the other squirrels) are a group of six French squirrels who frequently serve as Harvey and his friends' rivals. With the exception of Jean Luc, they communicate primarily through squirrel chatter and French-like gibberish.
- Officer Fredd (voiced by Michael-Leon Wooley) is a caterpillar police officer who enforces the law in Littlebark Grove. His appearance and mannerisms are inspired by Judge Dredd.
- Curtis "The Inspiration" (voiced by Mikey Kelley) and Janet "Pooker" Snapper (voiced by Rachel Butera) are Technobear's adoptive turtle parents. Their nicknames reference Michael Sorrentino and Nicole Polizzi from Jersey Shore.
- Aiden (voiced by Jim O'Heir) and Miley (voiced by Catherine O'Hara) are Harvey's maternal grandparents. Aiden is a retired police officer, while Miley is a retired judge.
- Roland Beaks (voiced by Blake Clark) is Harvey's paternal grandfather. Stoic and reserved, he gradually becomes more emotionally open over the course of the series.
- Blister (voiced by Ken Jenkins) is an elderly, agoraphobic mole whom Fee befriends. He is later revealed to be Randl's long-lost father.
- Bada (voiced by C. H. Greenblatt) and Grada (voiced by Maria Bamford) are Fee and Foo's parents, who are introduced in the series finale after years of searching for their children.

== Production ==
Greenblatt had previously created the show Chowder for Cartoon Network and had started to develop his next project shortly after it ended in 2010. Greenblatt was looking to create a series with a different vibe from Chowder, which was largely absurdist and comical in nature, by telling stories that had more heart and emotional connection with the audience. Greenblatt pitched the idea to Nickelodeon under the title Bad Seeds and an 11-minute pilot was commissioned. Bad Seeds was eventually picked up for a full series in September 2013, but had to change its name halfway through production due to trademark issues. Greenblatt turned to social networking sites such as Tumblr while building the crew of Harvey Beaks, hiring artists who had little to no prior experience working in animation, but were brought on board due to the quality of their personal work.

As with Greenblatt's previous show, Harvey Beaks features child actors providing the voices for the younger characters, with the exception of major characters Dade and Princess Roberts (voiced by C. H. Greenblatt and Andres Salaff respectively). Most of the minor child characters are voiced by adults.

On June 21, 2015, it was confirmed that the show was renewed for a second season, which began nearly a year later on June 13, 2016, with the episode "The New Bugaboo".

From 2016 to 2017, former DreamWorks animator Januel Mercado served as Harvey Beaks' supervising director.

== Cancellation ==
On November 6, 2016, C. H. Greenblatt announced that the series had been cancelled. Additionally, he confirmed that the remaining episodes would air on Nicktoons, which he had not been aware of until seeing a Twitter post from Nickelodeon. Harvey Beaks was originally set to premiere new episodes on Nicktoons on November 20, 2016. Following a series of angry rants by Greenblatt (which were later deleted), the episodes were delayed. Greenblatt later stated in a Tumblr post the following February, "I literally have no idea when or where or if [the episodes]'ll air." The new episodes eventually started airing on Nicktoons on March 1, 2017. The last episode aired on Nicktoons on December 29, 2017.

== Music ==
All of the music in Harvey Beaks is composed by Ego Plum. It is also played by a 40-piece orchestra. The theme song was performed by Plum, Steve Bartek, Bob Mothersbaugh and David J.

== Broadcast ==
Harvey Beaks made its international debut on Nicktoons in the United Kingdom and Ireland on May 11, 2015. The series premiered on Nickelodeon in Africa on June 1 and on Nickelodeon in Australia and New Zealand on June 6. The Southeast Asian feed of Nickelodeon debuted the show on June 8 in the Philippines and on June 29 in Singapore and Malaysia. The series premiered on YTV in Canada on October 10, 2015, and on September 10, 2016, on the original channel. According to the programming page, in Albania, it airs on the network Çufo and Yle in Finland. The series is currently available on Paramount+, with season 2 removed from the streaming platform in January 2024.

== Reception ==
Harvey Beaks received mostly positive reviews from critics. It has 4 stars out of 5 on Common Sense Media and a 7.7/10 on BehindtheVoiceActors.

=== Accolades ===
| Year | Award | Category | Nominee | Result | Source |
|---|---|---|---|---|---|
| 2016 | Annie Award | Best Animated TV/Broadcast Production for Children's Audience | Harvey Beaks (for "A Day of No To-Do") | Nominated | |
| 2016 | Annie Award | Outstanding Achievement in Character Design in an Animated TV/Broadcast Production | David Tilton (for "Nightclub Night") | Nominated | |
| 2016 | Parents' Choice Award | Parents' Choice Silver Honor | | Won | |
| 2016 | Young Artist Award | Best Performance in a Voice-Over Role - Young Actress (11 and Younger) | Nicole Taylor Wedel | Nominated | |
| 2017 | Daytime Emmy Award | Outstanding Writing in an Animated Program | C. H. Greenblatt, Shane Houghton, Kevin Kramer, Amalia Levari, & Dani Michaeli | Nominated | |
| 2017 | Parents' Choice Award | Parents' Choice Recommended | for "Steampunks Part I and II" | Won | |

== Comics ==
Issue one of the Harvey Beaks comic by Stefan Petrucha and the writers of the tv show was due for release on January 26, 2016. A special comic was available for free at San Diego Comic-Con in 2015.
