= Liz Climo =

American cartoonist

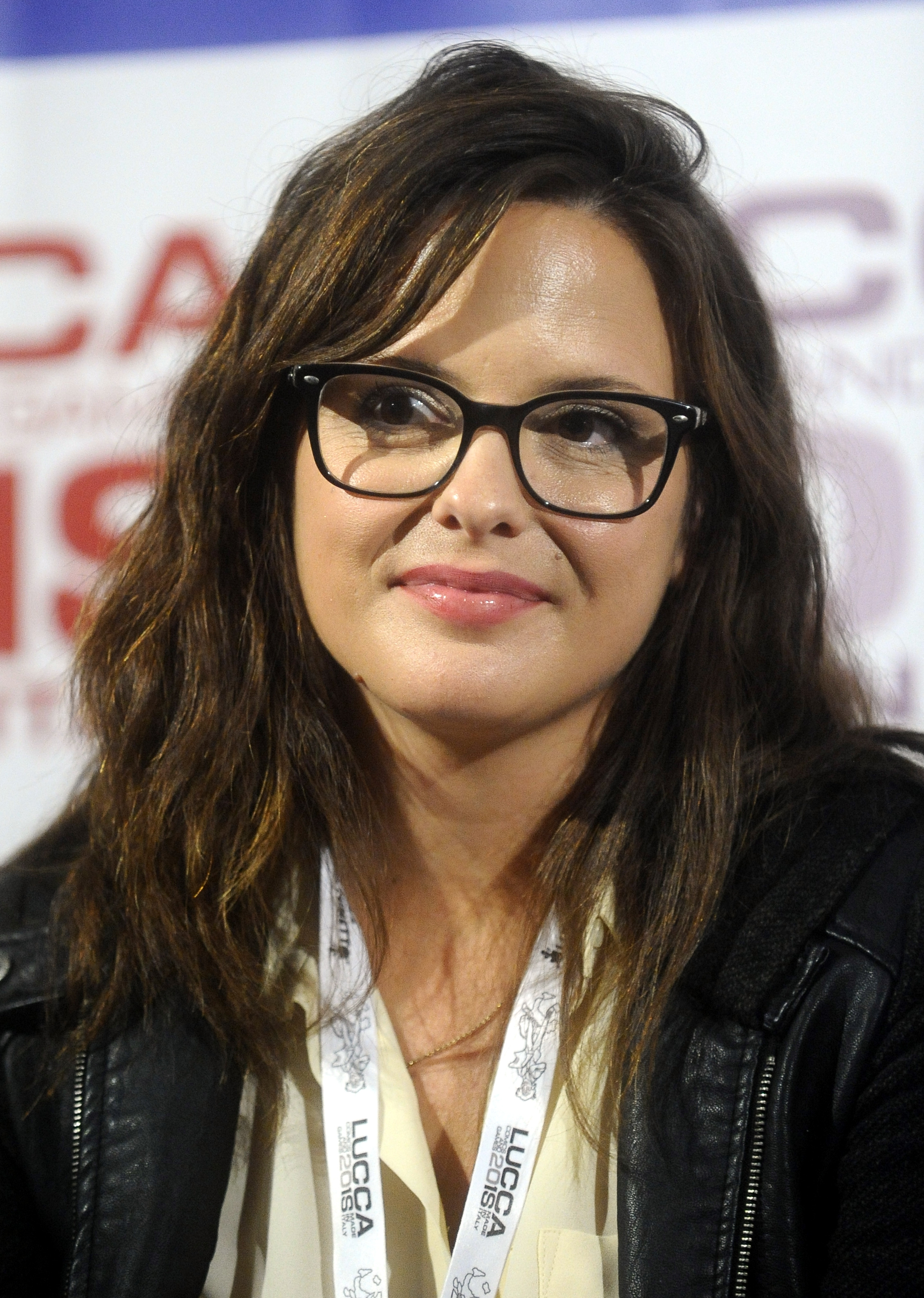
- Liz Climo at Lucca Comics & Games 2018 03
- Born: July 24, 1981 (age 45); Silicon Valley, California
- Education: San Jose State University
- Occupations: Cartoonist, animator, writer
- Writing career
- Genres: children's literature, picture book, webcomic
- Website: thelittleworldofliz.com

Liz Climo (born July 24, 1981) is an American cartoonist, animator, children's book author, and illustrator. She is best known for her webcomics, which she posts regularly to her website, The Little World of Liz, and her Rory the Dinosaur children's book series. She has also been animating on the television series The Simpsons since 2003.

== Biography ==
Climo was born and raised in Silicon Valley, where she attended San Jose State University (SJSU). At SJSU, Climo applied for the university's animation program, but was not accepted. Despite this setback, and before graduating from SJSU, Climo was hired as an animator on The Simpsons and moved to Los Angeles.

After working in the industry for a few years, Climo started a blog on Tumblr, where she occasionally posted comics and drawings. The blog eventually gained momentum, which led to her career in publishing. Since then, Climo has worked as a children's book author, has published calendars, and has a successful greeting card line featured at Target and Walmart.

Climo currently lives in Los Angeles with her husband and daughter.

== Works ==
=== Author/Illustrator ===
- Rory the Dinosaur
  - Rory the Dinosaur: Me and My Dad (2015)
  - Rory the Dinosaur Wants a Pet (2016)
  - Rory the Dinosaur Needs a Christmas Tree (2017)
  - Forthcoming Rory the Dinosaur title
- The Little World of Liz Climo
  - The Little World of Liz Climo (2013)
  - Lobster is the Best Medicine (2015)
  - Best Bear Ever! (2018)
- Please Don't Eat Me (2019)
- You're Mom (2020)
- You're Dad (2021)
- You're Loved (2022)
- I'm So Happy You're Here (2022)
- Life in the Present: A Joyful Collection of Comics About Living in the Moment (2024)

=== Illustrator ===
- You Don't Want A Unicorn!, Ame Dyckman (2017)
- Can Somebody Please Scratch My Back?, Jory John (2018)
- You Don't Want a Dragon!, Ame Dyckman (2020)
- First Day Critter Jitters, Jory John (2020)
- Summer Camp Critter Jitters, Jory John (2021)

== Filmography ==
=== Film ===
Year	Title	Notes
2007	The Simpsons Movie	Artist

=== Television ===
Year	Title	Notes
2003–2017	The Simpsons	Animator; Character Layout Artist (2005-2009); Lead Character Layout Artist (2009-2010); Animatic layout Artist (2010–2017); Storyboard Revisionist (2010)
2011	The LeBrons	Storyboard Artist
2016	Harvey Beaks	Writer & Storyboard Artist (Double Digits)

== Reception ==
Climo and her work have been featured by publications and websites including The Huffington Post, The Toast, The Daily Dot, HitFix, Flavorwire, and The National Post (Ontario). Her works have been translated into 8 languages, and she is a bestselling author in China.

School Library Journal calls Climo's debut book "a read-aloud option with broad appeal" and "an excellent addition for most collections." The Horn Book Guide to Children's and Young Adult Books affirms that "love between father and son abounds on each spread," while Kirkus Reviews adds that "readers will appreciate the clean design and the warm and humorous story; they'll hope Rory sets off again soon."

Rory the Dinosaur Wants a Pet, Climo's second book, has been called "a cheerfully absurd portrait of unconditional love" (Publishers Weekly), "a fun book to share with the very young either one-on-one or in small groups" (School Library Journal). School Library Journal praises Climo's "simple yet clear, colorful, and expressive" illustrations, while Kirkus Reviews lauds her "lighthearted approach" and describes the title as "an appealing read-aloud" with an "innocent silliness."

In 2024, Climo would be a recipient of the Inkpot Award at the annual San Diego Comic Con.
