= Rule of Wolves =

2021 fantasy novel by Leigh Bardugo

- Author: Leigh Bardugo
- Cover artist: Natalie Souza and Hedi Xandt
- Language: English
- Series: King of Scars duology
- Genre: Fantasy
- Publisher: Imprint
- Publication date: March 30, 2021
- Media type: Print
- Pages: 592
- ISBN: 978-1250142306
- Preceded by: King of Scars

Rule of Wolves is a fantasy novel written by American author Leigh Bardugo, published by Imprint in 2021. It is the seventh overall novel in Bardugo's Grishaverse and the final novel in the King of Scars duology. The story takes place several weeks after the end of King of Scars and follows the third-person perspectives of Nikolai Lantsov, Zoya Nazyalensky, Nina Zenik, Mayu Kir-Kaat, and the Darkling (referred to as 'The Monk').

== Plot ==
Shu Han's ruler, Queen Makhi Kir-Taban, plots to kill her sister Ehri from taking the throne when a blot of darkness with a likeness to the Shadow Fold spreads past the Unsea and into Shu Han. Nina Zenik has successfully infiltrated the Ice Court under the alias Mila Jandersdat, serving as Hanne Brum's courtier. The pair decide that Hanne must enter herself into the Heartwood, a competition between women to decide who they will marry. She gains the favor of Fjerda's Prince Rasmus when she uses her Grisha healing power to lessen his chronic illness. Nina aids the Ravkan war effort by turning the Fjerdans to worship the Grisha saints, creating divide in the ranks of the drüskelle. She discovers that Jarl Brum has kept Nikolai Lantsov's birth father, Magnus Opjer, under prison and plans to use letters between him and the former Ravkan queen to get Nikolai deposed. Hanne and Rasmus grow closer but Rasmus is revealed to be a power-hungry tyrant who feels satisfaction at other people's misery. Nina also discovers that Rasmus's bodyguard, Joran, killed Matthias Helvar in Ketterdam. Torn between loyalties and morals, Nina almost blows her cover to Jarl but manages to keep herself together. Nina and Hanne develop a romantic relationship and plan to run away after converting the Fjerdans to realizing the Grisha are not abominations.

Nikolai struggles to hold the throne due to the accusations of his bastardry. He has developed a control over his demon but depends on doing another obisbaya to rid himself of the darkness inside of him, kill the Darkling, and prevent another Shadow Fold from being formed. he works closely with David Kostyk to develop nuclear warheads and together with Nina's messages from inside Fjerda they are able to triumph over Fjerda and reclaim their Grisha using antidotes to jurda parem. Zoya Nazyalensky mourns her mentor Juris's death but feels incompetent to wield his dragon powers. The Darkling brokers a deal to let him meet with Alina Starkov and in return he will lead them to the thornwood that will allow the obisbaya to take place. He uses a branch of the wood to pierce both Alina and Mal, giving him control of the darkness again before he escapes under the guise of Yuri Vedenen to assemble supporters of the Starless Saint.

Makhi kills all of Ehri's bodyguards but Ehri manages to survive with the help of Grisha healers. Ehri, Tamar Kir-Bataar, and Mayu Kir-Kaat escape to Shu Han and convince the governing body to remove Makhi by exposing the khergud program, and Mayu reunites with her brother Reyem. Leyti Kir-Taban, Ehri and Makhi's grandmother, takes back the throne.

Os Kervo is bombed from above by Fjerda on the day David and Genya Safin were to be married. David is killed and Ravka becomes weaker without enough titanium to build the weapons to retaliate. Nikolai and Zoya travel to Ketterdam under the cover of Sturmhond and employ the aid of Kaz Brekker to steal a cache of titanium from a military base on Kerch. The pair become close but Zoya refuses to give in to her feelings after she had failed Juris and her aunt. When they return to Ravka, Nikolai meets an escaped Magnus and accepts that he is a bastard king without any Lantsov blood. He uses his influence as Sturmhond to lead the Fjerdan forces into a trap, opening a blockade and ambushing them with Grisha forces led by Zoya. Fjerda responds using a weapon called 'Songbird' that deafens their forces, but Nikolai's demon neutralizes the threat. The escaped khergud aid the battle effort and go into hiding until the war is finished. Nina is brought onto a Fjerdan base with the Brum family and Rasmus. She is betrayed by The Apparat, who has installed himself in the Fjerdan court. Zoya rescues Nina and escapes by accepting her love for Nikolai and becoming a dragon, but Hanne is left seemingly dead by the hands of Rasmus. Zoya's dragon form finishes off the Fjerdan fleet and she becomes worshipped as Sankta Zoya by the Fjerdans and Ravkans. Hanne is revealed to have tailored her body to look like Rasmus's and she and Nina become engaged while Jarl is exiled for his embarrassment as leader of the drüskelle while the Apparat is imprisoned. Nikolai, who has accepted the demon within him, relinquishes his crown and Zoya becomes the Dragon Queen, first of the Nazyalensky royal bloodline.

In the aftermath of the battle, Shu Han and Ravka make amends. The Darkling willingly imprisons himself in Sankt Feliks's thornwood, stopping the flow of the Fold and consigning himself to eternal torture. Zoya, Genya, and Alina plot to find a way to let him die in peace after his redemption by finding Feliks's heart. Zoya sends a message to Kaz and the Crows that they have a new mission from the Queen.

== Characters ==
- Nikolai Lantsov: The King of Ravka.
- Zoya Nazyalensky: General of the Second Army, a Squaller.
- Nina Zenik: A Ravkan spy with the unique Grisha ability to control the dead. Deep undercover in Fjerda.
- Genya Safin: Member of the Triumvirate, a Grisha Tailor.
- Tamar Kir-Bataar: A Heartrender soldier loyal to Nikolai.
- Tolya Yul-Bataar: Tamar's brother.
- David Kostyk: Member of the Triumvirate, a Grisha Durast.
- Mayu Kir-Kaat: A Shu Han assassin loyal to the Queen.
- Aleksander Morozova / The Darkling / The Monk: Formerly known as the Black Heretic, a Grisha with power over darkness resurrected in the body of Yuri Vedenen.

== Reception ==
Kirkus Reviews called the novel a "wild ride both fantastical and grounded in nuance" that "manages to tidy up almost all ends but still leaves space for more to come." Linda H. Codega from Tor.com took note of the novel's political intrigue but took fault with the "skeleton of an ending, with all the hallmarks of Bardugo’s...writing but without the charm of the last duology."

Rule of Wolves received the Goodreads Choice Award for Best Young Adult Fantasy and Science Fiction in 2021.

=== Accolades ===
Year-end lists
| Year | Publication | Category | Result | Ref |
|---|---|---|---|---|
| 2021 | Book Riot | Top Books of 2021 | —N/a | |
| 2021 | Kobo | Our top 20 Kids & Young Adult picks of 2021 | —N/a | |
| 2021 | Tor | The Best Books of 2021 | —N/a | |

== Future ==
The ending of the novel teases more for the Crows, aligning with Bardugo's previous statements that she has long-term plans for a third Six of Crows novel. However, Rule of Wolves will serve as an ending to Nikolai, Zoya, and Alina's storyline with Bardugo commenting: “I want to let the Grishaverse be at the crossroads...for me, there’s a great sense of peace knowing that a lot of the story has already been told.”
