= Deutscher Fantasy Preis =

Germany literary prize

Deutscher Fantasy Preis is a literary prize of Germany. It was established in 1979 by the Erster Deutscher Fantasy Club (First German Fantasy Club), and is awarded to German-speaking authors, publishers and translators in the field of fantasy literature. From 1992 to 2008 the prize was endowed every fourth year by the city of Passau when it was awarded at the Kongresse der Phantasie (Congress of Fantasy) convention.

== Past winners ==
- 2021 – Dieter von Reeken
