= Elizabeth Van Lew =

American civil war spy (1818–1900)

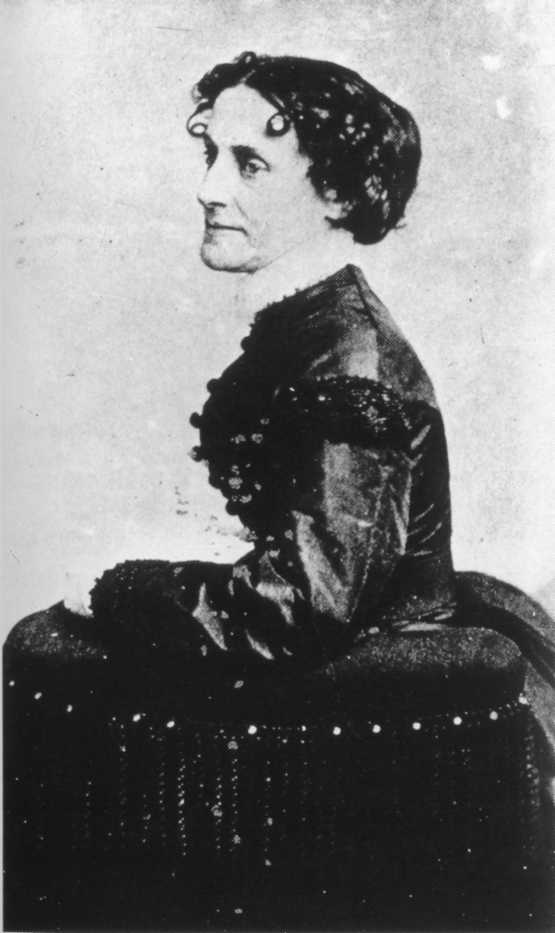
- Born: October 12, 1818; Richmond, Virginia
- Died: September 25, 1900 (aged 81); Richmond, Virginia, U.S.
- Resting place: Shockoe Hill Cemetery; 37.551816, -77.432016
- Known for: Espionage during the American Civil War

Elizabeth Van Lew (October 12, 1818 – September 25, 1900) was an American abolitionist, Southern Unionist, and philanthropist who recruited and acted as the primary handler of an extensive spy ring for the Union army in the Confederate capital of Richmond during the American Civil War.

== Early life ==
Elizabeth Van Lew was born on October 12, 1818, in Richmond, Virginia. Her father was John Van Lew and Eliza Baker was her mother. Her maternal grandfather was Hilary Baker, mayor of Philadelphia from 1796 to 1798. John Van Lew came to Richmond in 1806, at the age of 16; within 20 years, he had built up a prosperous hardware business and owned several slaves.

Van Lew was educated in Philadelphia. The Quaker school she attended is thought to have been influential in forming her anti-slavery views. Following her father's death in 1843, Van Lew and her mother continued to live in the family's home in Richmond. John Van Lew's will stipulated that none of the family's enslaved human property could be freed. However, Elizabeth and her mother helped the slaves in their household to earn wages and a measure of freedom. While the Van Lew family benefited from slavery, she believed it would eventually fade away. Her hope was that Southerners would free their slaves and that emancipation by manumission would gradually end the practice that she viewed as abhorrent and destructive to the South.

== American Civil War ==
Upon the outbreak of the war, Van Lew began working on behalf of the Union with her mother, caring for wounded soldiers. She was allowed to bring food, clothing, writing paper, and other things to the Union soldiers imprisoned at Libby Prison. She aided prisoners in escape attempts, passing them information about safe houses and getting a Union sympathizer appointed to the prison staff. Van Lew reportedly helped Union soldiers by giving them money to bribe Confederates.

Recently captured prisoners gave Van Lew information on Confederate troop levels and movements, which she passed on to Union commanders. She is rumored to have helped hide escaped Union prisoners and Confederate deserters in her own mansion, although no definite proof has been found.

Van Lew also operated a spy ring during the war which included clerks in the War and Navy Departments of the Confederacy, as well as free and enslaved blacks, including Mary Jane Richards, more commonly known as Mary Bowser. Bowser reputedly had been a slave in the Van Lew household, and she was sent by the family to be educated in a Quaker school in Pennsylvania. Stories surfaced about her having served as a maid for Jefferson Davis while spying for the Union. She admitted to serving as a detective during the war.

The spy ring eventually became official agents of the Union when General Benjamin Butler heard about Van Lew from two escaped Union prisoners of war, and he recruited her to work for the U.S. government.

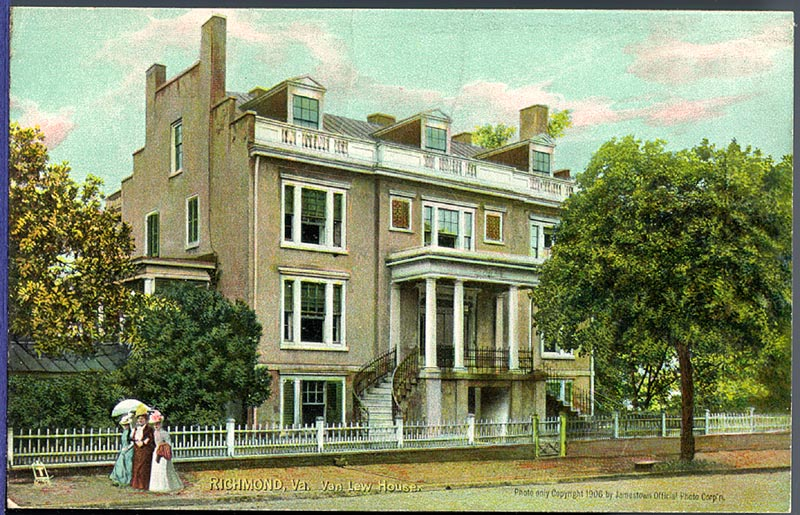
The Elizabeth Van Lew mansion in Richmond, Virginia; ca. 1906

Van Lew's spy network was so efficient that she sent Lt. Gen. Ulysses S. Grant fresh flowers from her garden and a copy of the Richmond newspaper. She developed a cipher system and often smuggled messages out of Richmond in hollow eggs. Union commanders highly valued Van Lew's work; intelligence commander George H. Sharpe, Army of the Potomac, recommended that the government reimburse her $15,000 because of the great expense which she incurred in her efforts, including employment of spies. General Grant appointed Van Lew Postmaster General of Richmond for the next eight years because of the value of her work.

After the siege of Petersburg, Van Lew assisted civilians of both sides.

== Postwar life ==
Richmond fell to Union forces in April 1865, and Van Lew was the first person to raise the United States flag in the city.

Grant visited Richmond after the war and had tea with Van Lew, and he later appointed her postmaster of Richmond. She modernized the city's postal system and employed several black men at the same pay and benefits as white employees. President Rutherford B. Hayes had her replaced in 1877. She returned as a postal clerk in Richmond, where she served from 1883 to 1887.

Van Lew became increasingly ostracized in Richmond following Reconstruction. "No one will walk with us on the street," she wrote, "no one will go with us anywhere; and it grows worse and worse as the years roll on." She had spent her family's fortune on intelligence activities during the war, but she tried in vain to be reimbursed by the federal government. She also failed to secure a government pension, but she received support from the family and friends of Union Col. Paul Joseph Revere, whom she had helped while he was held prisoner during the Civil War. Bostonians also collected money for the woman who helped so many Union soldiers during the war. However, neighborhood children were told to consider her a witch.

== Death and legacy ==
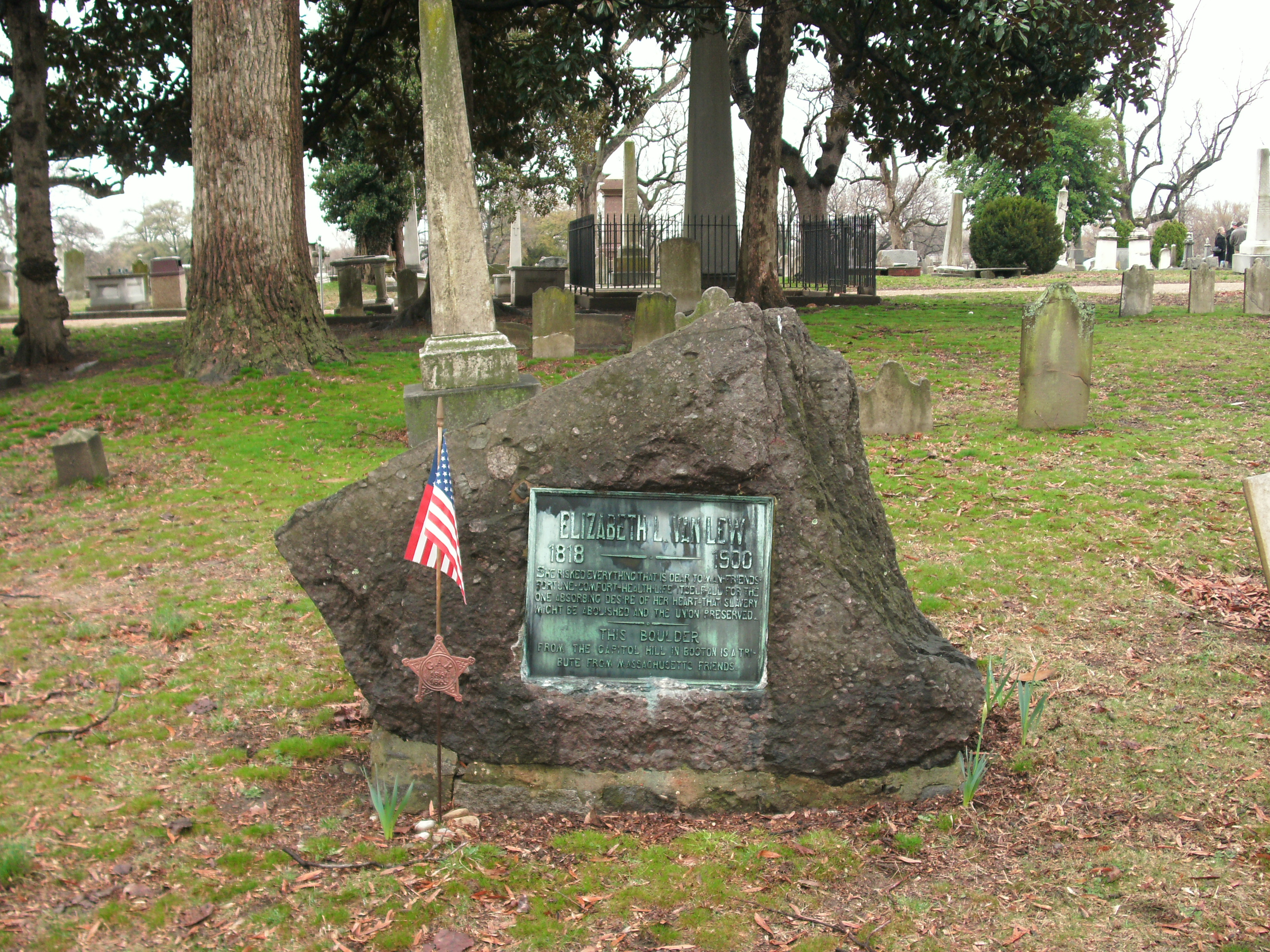
Grave of Elizabeth Van Lew

Van Lew died on September 25, 1900, at age 81. She was buried in Richmond's Shockoe Hill Cemetery in the same grave as her niece Eliza Van Lew, who had been her constant companion in her later years and had died just a few months before her. Relatives of Union Colonel Paul J. Revere, whom she had aided during the war, donated the tombstone. The epitaph reads: "ELIZABETH L. VAN LEW (1818–1900) She risked everything that is dear to man – friends – fortune – comfort – health – life itself – that slavery might be abolished and the Union preserved. This boulder from the Capitol Hill in Boston is a tribute from Massachusetts friends."

In her will, Van Lew bequeathed her personal manuscripts to John P. Reynolds, Col. Revere's nephew; this included her account of the war. In 1911, Reynolds convinced scholar William G. Beymer to publish the first biography of Van Lew in Harper's Monthly. The biography indicated that Van Lew had been successful in her spying activities because she had feigned lunacy, and this allegedly won Van Lew the nickname "Crazy Bet". However, it is highly unlikely that Van Lew actually did pretend to be insane. Instead, she likely relied on the Victorian custom of female charity to cover her espionage.

The city of Richmond acquired and demolished the Van Lew mansion in 1911. Bellevue Elementary School was erected on the site the following year. Historical plaques and a marker now memorialize her activities and those of Mary Jane Richards (commonly known as "Bowser").

Elizabeth Van Lew was inducted into the Military Intelligence Hall of Fame in 1993.

== Books and films ==
Elizabeth Van Lew was an insignificant character in the 1944 book Yankee Stranger by Elswyth Thane, the second in her Williamsburg series, and a character in The Secrets of Mary Bowser, a novel by Lois Leveen. Her story was also fictionalized in 1995 children's book The Secret of the Lion's Head by Beverly Hall, the 2005 novel Elizabeth Van Lew: Civil War Spy by Heidi Schoof, the 2006 novel Only Call Us Faithful: A Novel of the Union Underground by Marie Jakober, the 2013 novel The Spymistress by Jennifer Chiaverini, and the 2016 novel "Crazy Bet and the Gentleman from Massachusetts" by Frederick Lapisardi. Gerri Willis writes a 2025 novel looking at Van Lew's career in Civil War espionage called "Lincoln's Lady Spymaster. [9] Willis, Gerri; Lincoln's Lady Spymaster, 2025, Harper Collins Publishers ISBN 9780063333666

The 1987 television movie A Special Friendship tells a fictionalized story of the friendship and pro-Union collaboration of Van Lew (who is presented as a young, rather than middle-aged, woman in the film) and her former slave Mary Bowser. The 1990 television movie Traitor in My House tells the story of Van Lew from the perspective of her niece; Mary Kay Place portrays Van Lew. She is portrayed in 2026 on Prime Video, The Gray House by Daisy Head, which directly tells the story of the network of Van Lew's spies.

A fictionalized, but heavily researched, account of Elizabeth Van Lew's work during the Civil War is included in Karen Abbott's 2015 novel, Liar, Temptress, Soldier, Spy: Four Women Undercover in the Civil War. The title of Abbott's novel pays homage to British novelist and former spy John le Carré's Cold War thriller Tinker Tailor Soldier Spy, because all four women were amateur spies.
