= Heartbreak Hotel (film) =

1988 film by Chris Columbus

- Theatrical release poster
- Directed by: Chris Columbus
- Written by: Chris Columbus
- Produced by: Debra Hill; Lynda Obst
- Starring: David Keith; Tuesday Weld; Charlie Schlatter
- Cinematography: Steve Dobson
- Edited by: Raja Gosnell
- Music by: Georges Delerue
- Production companies: Touchstone Pictures; Silver Screen Partners III
- Distributed by: Buena Vista Pictures Distribution
- Release date: September 30, 1988
- Running time: 97 minutes
- Country: United States
- Language: English
- Budget: $13 million
- Box office: $5.5 million (US/Canada)

Heartbreak Hotel is a 1988 American comedy film written and directed by Chris Columbus, and starring David Keith, Tuesday Weld and Charlie Schlatter. Set in 1972, the story deals with one of the many "legends" involving Elvis Presley (Keith) about his fictional kidnapping, and his subsequent redemption from decadence.

The film was shot on location in Austin, Texas, at Green Pastures, the former residence of John Henry Faulk. Heartbreak Hotel was released by Buena Vista Pictures Distribution on September 30, 1988. The film received mixed to negative reviews from critics and grossed $5.5 million against a $13 million budget.

== Plot ==
Set in 1972, Heartbreak Hotel follows Marie Wolfe (played by Tuesday Weld), a single mother who runs a hotel with her teenage son Johnny (played by Charlie Schlatter) and young daughter Pam (played by Angela Goethals). When Marie is seriously injured in a car accident, Johnny hatches an outlandish plan to cheer her up for her birthday: he decides to kidnap her musical idol, Elvis Presley (played by David Keith).

Johnny and his high school band drive Marie’s pink Cadillac to Cleveland, Ohio, where Elvis is performing. With the help of a local pizzeria owner—who bears a strong resemblance to Elvis’s late mother, Gladys—Johnny stages a fake ghostly visitation to distract Elvis. He then renders the singer unconscious using chloroform and brings him back to the Wolfe boarding house.

Elvis awakens confused and furious, finding himself held captive by a group of teenagers. Initially, he clashes with Johnny, who accuses him of betraying his roots and selling out to the glitz of Las Vegas. However, over time, the two form an unlikely friendship, and Elvis begins to reconnect with the simple joys and authenticity he'd lost in his celebrity life.

The film concludes with Elvis joining Johnny’s band for a performance of "Heartbreak Hotel" at the local high school talent show—a moment that symbolizes healing, rebellion, and the redemptive power of rock and roll.

== Cast ==
- David Keith as Elvis Presley
- Tuesday Weld as Marie Wolfe
- Charlie Schlatter as Johnny Wolfe
- Angela Goethals as Pam Wolfe
- Jacque Lynn Colton as Rosie Pantangellio
- Chris Mulkey as Steve Ayres
- Karen Landry as Irene
- Tudor Sherrard as Paul Quinine
- Paul J. Harkins as Brian Gasternick (as Paul Harkins)
- Noel Derecki as Tony Vandelo
- Dana Barron as Beth Devereux
- T. Graham Brown as Jerry Schilling
- Dennis Letts as Alan Fortas
- Stephen Lee Davis as George Klein
- Blue Deckert as Jones
- Michael Costello as Doctor Charles Devereux
- John L. Martin as Sheriff Abrams
- John Hawkes as M.C.
- Jerry Haynes as Mr. Hansen
- Al Dvorin as Self
- Ruth Sadlier as Aunt Anne
- Monica Devereux as Monica
- Hal Ketchum as Steve's Friend
- Debra Luijtjes as Cheryl
- Diane Robin as Donna

== Reception ==
The film received mixed-to-negative reviews. It currently holds a 38% rating on Rotten Tomatoes based on 13 reviews.

Janet Maslin of The New York Times stated that "Mr. Columbus, who previously directed Adventures in Baby-Sitting and whose writing credits include Gremlins and The Goonies, sets up this idea well but has no idea where to stop. He pushes the film's slender premise much too far, trying to work miraculous feats of self-improvement upon Johnny, his mother, Marie, and even Elvis himself." The Washington Post's Rita Kempley wrote, "With such fruity writing, what do overacting and miscasting (Jay Leno would have been perfect) matter? Playing Elvis is like playing a Kennedy, nearly impossible. And Keith, as we know, had mighty big pants to fill. Face it. The King has left the building, gone to that Caesars Palace in the sky. Columbus, say goodbye."

A one-star review came from Roger Ebert who wrote, "Here it is, the goofiest movie of the year, a movie so bad in so many different and endearing ways that I’m damned if I don’t feel genuine affection for it. We all know it’s bad manners to talk during a movie, but every once in a while a film comes along that positively requires the audience to shout helpful suggestions and lewd one-liners at the screen. 'Heartbreak Hotel' is such a movie. All it needs to be perfect is a parallel soundtrack." Ebert's onscreen review partner Gene Siskel also agreed and the pair included the film in their Worst of 1988 show.

It was also a box office failure, opening with a disappointing $2,063,546 from 1,338 screens, finishing in second place behind Gorillas in the Mist, despite opening on more than double the number of screens. It went on to gross $5.5 million in the United States and Canada.

== Music ==
Most of the songs contained in the film are actual Elvis Presley recordings despite the film being fictional, with David Keith and Charlie Schlatter performing the title track in the style of the 1968 television special recording.
