= Ricardo Aleman =

American writer and comedian

- Aleman in 2007
- Born: April 25, 1977 (age 49); Freehold, New Jersey, U.S.
- Other name: Rick Mann

Comedy career
- Years active: 1998–present
- Medium: Stand up comedy, television
- Website: FunnyMexican.com

Ricardo Aleman (born April 25, 1977) is an American writer and comedian based in New York City where he performs regularly at Comic Strip Live, and was a featured comedian in their Guinness World Record 50 hour "Longest Stand Up Comedy Show". He has appeared on NBC's reality television show America's Got Talent, where he insulted judges David Hasselhoff and Piers Morgan. Immediately after which, Ricardo released his first CD entitled REALITY CD: I Am Not An Insult Comic. Previous television standup comedy appearances have included Si Tv's Latino Laugh Festival, and LTV's Llegamos. His first acting role was in the movie version of Yale’s Porn 'n Chicken club which aired on Comedy Central. Ricardo was also a featured regular on the Sirius Satellite Radio show Four Quota’s hosted by Steve Hofstetter. He is of Mexican-American ethnicity.

== Weight loss ==
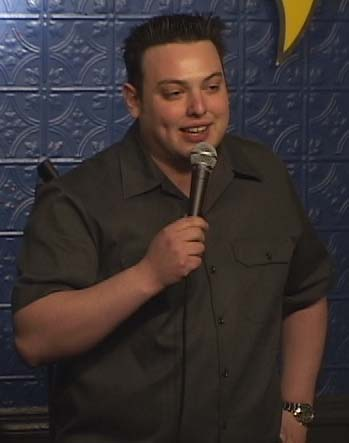
Ricardo Aleman - 250 pounds May 1, 2004

Over the course of the five years following the loss of his father to cancer in 1999, Ricardo's weight ballooned from 180 lbs to 250 lbs. It took him two years to lose the weight. During those two years he videotaped many of his performances and edited them together into one video to demonstrate his weight loss success.

== Books ==
- Teenaged Male’s Guide To a Better Life: A dumb book I wrote when I was 15. Hindsight is hilarious! (2007, Lulu.com)

== CD releases ==
- REALITY CD: I Am Not An Insult Comic (2007, Lulu.com)
