= The Gray House (TV series) =

American television series

- Genre: Historical drama
- Written by: Darrell Fetty; John Sayles; Leslie Greif
- Directed by: Roland Joffé
- Starring: Mary-Louise Parker; Daisy Head; Paul Anderson; Amethyst Davis; Ian Duff; Hannah James; Robert Knepper; Christopher McDonald; Colin Morgan; Rob Morrow; Colin O'Donoghue; Sam Trammell; Keith David; Ben Vereen
- Composers: Bruce Broughton; John Debney
- Country of origin: United States
- Original language: English
- No. of episodes: 8

Production
- Executive producers: Kevin Costner; Morgan Freeman; Lori McCreary; Rod Lake; Howard Kaplan; Leslie Greif
- Producers: Darrell Fetty; Cristi Bostanescu; Christopher Landry; Keith Neal; Eric Tomosunas
- Cinematography: Jan Moeskops
- Editors: Don Cassidy; Naseem Loloie
- Production companies: Territory Pictures; Revelations Entertainment; Republic Pictures; Big Dreams Entertainment

Original release
- Network: Prime Video
- Release: February 26, 2026

The Gray House is an American historical drama television miniseries. Executive produced by Kevin Costner and Morgan Freeman, the ensemble cast is led by Mary-Louise Parker, Amethyst Davis, Daisy Head, and Ben Vereen.

The series began streaming all 8 episodes on February 26, 2026, on Prime Video.

== Premise ==
Based on a true story, the series is about a Union-aligned woman-led network of spies led by Elizabeth Van Lew in Richmond, Virginia during the American Civil War.

== Cast ==
=== Main ===
- Mary-Louise Parker as Eliza Van Lew/Baker
- Daisy Head as Elizabeth Van Lew
- Paul Anderson as Stokely Reeves
- Amethyst Davis as Mary Jane Richards
- Ian Duff as Jericho Bowser
- Hannah James as Clara Parish
- Robert Knepper as Bully Lumpkin
- Christopher McDonald as Thomas McNiven
- Colin Morgan as Hampton Arsenault
- Rob Morrow as Judah Benjamin
- Colin O'Donoghue as Captain William Lounsbury
- Sam Trammell as Jefferson Davis
- Keith David as Henry H. Garnet
- Ben Vereen as Isham Worthy

=== Recurring ===
- Ewan Miller as John Van Lew Jr.
- Catherine Hannay as Laurette Van Lew
- Oli Green as Paul Joseph Revere
- Joshua McGuire as Erasmus Ross
- Ben Cura as Timothy Webster
- Michael Woods as Deputy Pike
- Ella Schrey-Yeats as Katey
- Blake Patrick Anderson as Obie Wise
- Darrell Fetty as Duncan Broadnaxe
- Charles Craddock as John Wilkes Booth
- Catherine Carton as Talulah
- John Ojeyemi as Mose Robinson
- Geoffrey MacCarthy as Robert Ford
- Thom Beers as John Winder
- Bogdan Farcaș as John Caphart
- Mark Perry as Henry Wise
- Ionuț Grama as Sherrard Clemens
- Laura Morgan as Varina Davis
- Elizabeth J Cron as Charmaine Hobbs
- Lindsay Forster as Mabel
- Nia Samara as Sookie
- Olivia Nita as Amanda Suggs
- Aryel Tsoto as Tadpole
- Leslie Greif as Doctor Graves
- Bu Kunene as Eula Sewell
- Zaquis Riddick as Peter Roane
- Oxana Morvec as Fredrika Bremer
- Voicu Aanitei as Lucious Diggs
- Cheherezade Valentine Okotaka Ebale as Caroline
- Ania Ivcovici as Annie Van Lew
- Ana Antonescu as Eliza Louise Van Lew
- Marc Jenner as Ulysses S. Grant
- Haris Salihovic as Chase Morton
- Eduardo Makiadi as Homer Simpson
- Voicu Aaniței as Lucious Diggs
- Doru Cǎtǎnnescu as Telegraph Clerk
- Dan Rǎdulescu as Delegate
- Jason Lamar Ricketts as Jeremiah
- Luca Vasile as Jasper Suggs
- Cālin Stanciu Jr. as Argus Plunkett
- Daniel Himschoot as Cade
- Ionut Cotrutǎ as Cade's Friend
- Tudor Pǎstrǎşcoiu as Elijah (President's Guard)
- Cosmin Dominte as George McClellan
- Eduart Trifa as Burton Harrison
- Lucian Iftime as Dick Turner
- Sandra James-Young as Lavinia
- Marsha Millar as Old Sadie
- Ștefan Iancu as Virgil Hawk

== Episodes ==
No.	Title	Directed by	Written by	Original release date
1	"Nothin' Like the Fourth of July"	Roland Joffé	Leslie Greif & Darrell Fetty and John Sayles	February 26, 2026
2	"Never Secede"	Roland Joffé	Leslie Greif & Darrell Fetty and John Sayles	February 26, 2026
3	"First Blood"	Roland Joffé	Leslie Greif & Darrell Fetty and John Sayles	February 26, 2026
4	"Spy Ring"	Roland Joffé	Leslie Greif & Darrell Fetty and John Sayles	February 26, 2026
5	"Treason Ends on the Gallows"	Roland Joffé	Leslie Greif & Darrell Fetty and John Sayles	February 26, 2026
6	"Alien Enemies"	Roland Joffé	Leslie Greif & Darrell Fetty and John Sayles	February 26, 2026
7	"Babcock"	Roland Joffé	Leslie Greif & Darrell Fetty and John Sayles	February 26, 2026
8	"The Firestorm"	Roland Joffé	Leslie Greif & Darrell Fetty and John Sayles	February 26, 2026

== Production ==
The eight-part limited series has Morgan Freeman and Lori McCreary as producers through Revelations Entertainment alongside Kevin Costner via Territory Pictures and Big Dreams Entertainment from Republic Pictures. The project was first reported in September 2022. Rod Lake, Howard Kaplan and Leslie Greif are also executive producers. Directed by Roland Joffé, filming took place in Romania from April through September 2023 with a cast including Mary-Louise Parker, Ben Vereen, Paul Anderson, Amethyst Davis, Daisy Head and Robert Knepper.

The soundtrack for the series includes an original song performed by Willie Nelson, which closes the series, as well as songs by Scott Stapp, Shania Twain, Killer Mike and Yolanda Adams and a Jon Bon Jovi co-written song performed by Adrienne Warren.

== Release ==
The series was shown at the Monte-Carlo Television Festival on June 14, 2024. In September 2025, Amazon Prime Video acquired U.S. rights to the series, planning to release it sometime in early 2026. All episodes of the series were released on February 26, 2026.

== Reception ==
The review aggregator website Rotten Tomatoes reported a 45% approval rating based on 11 critic reviews. The website's critics consensus reads, "An anachronistic retelling of forgotten heroes, The Gray House mostly disappoints with its lackluster writing, laughable characterizations, and misrepresented history." Metacritic, which uses a weighted average, gave a score of 48 out of 100 based on 10 critics, indicating "mixed or average" reviews.

Maggie Lovitt for Collider gave the series a 7/10 score. Lovitt did not care for the violence particularly towards Black people and women, finding it gratuitous, and did not like the historical embellishments, but complimented the general adherence to the spirit of the subject matter and the ensemble cast, particularly Paul Anderson's Stokely Reeves as the main villain.

Aramide Tinubu for Variety had a critical review stating, "Though sprawling and highly detailed, The Gray House becomes so clunky and overrun with extraneous characters and narratives that the women at its center nearly get lost in the chaos."
