= Phenom (TV series) =

American sitcom

- Genre: Sitcom
- Created by: Dick Blasucci; Marc Flanagan; Sam Simon
- Starring: Angela Goethals; Ashley Johnson; Jennifer Lien; Judith Light; Todd Louiso; William Devane (uncredited)
- Theme music composer: Carly Simon
- Opening theme: "The Promise and the Prize", performed by Carly Simon
- Composers: Michael Andreas; Stephen Graziano; Scott Harper; Fred Mollin; Tom Scott
- Country of origin: United States
- Original language: English
- No. of seasons: 1
- No. of episodes: 22

Production
- Executive producers: Dick Blasucci; James L. Brooks; Danny Kallis
- Producers: Hudson Hickman; Richard Sakai; Kathy Ann Stumpe
- Camera setup: Videotape; Multi-camera
- Running time: 22–24 minutes (approx.)
- Production companies: Gracie Films; ELP Communications; Columbia Pictures Television

Original release
- Network: ABC
- Release: September 14, 1993 – May 10, 1994

Phenom is an American sitcom about a tennis wunderkind that aired on ABC from September 14, 1993 to May 10, 1994. The series stars Angela Goethals, Judith Light, and an uncredited (at his request) William Devane. It was created by Dick Blasucci, Marc Flanagan and Sam Simon, with executive producers Dick Blasucci, James L. Brooks and Danny Kallis, and through ELP Communications, it was a production of Gracie Films in association with Columbia Pictures Television for ABC.

Phenom was placed in the time slot of Tuesdays at 8:30/7:30c, between Full House and Roseanne. The series did well in the ratings, ranking in the Top 30 and maintaining 95% of its Full House lead-in. Nonetheless, ABC cancelled the show after one season and replaced it with Me and the Boys, which was similarly cancelled after one season.

== Synopsis ==
Fifteen-year-old Angela Doolan has the potential to be a sports superstar but worries about losing her normality and severing her family ties. Angela's father has deserted the family to rediscover his youth and dally with younger women, leaving her mother, Dianne, to raise her children Angela, Brian, and Mary Margaret while trying to control her bitterness. Added to the fray is Angela's obsessive tennis coach, Lou, who is determined to bring out the champion in Angela regardless of the cost to her growth as a person.

== Cast ==
=== Main cast ===
- Angela Goethals – Angela Doolan
- Judith Light – Dianne Doolan
- Ashley Johnson – Mary Margaret Doolan
- Todd Louiso – Brian Doolan
- William Devane – Lou Della Rosa (uncredited)
- Jennifer Lien – Roanne

=== Recurring cast ===
- Sara Rue – Monica
- Randy Josselyn – Jesse
- Beverley Mitchell – Clara
- Marianne Muellerleile – Sister Felicia
- Debra Jo Rupp – Sister Mary Incarnata
- John Christian Graas – Tony Lenchenko

== Production notes ==
The series was created by Dick Blasucci, Marc Flanagan, and Sam Simon. Blasucci also served as executive producer of the series, alongside Emmy Award-winner James L. Brooks and Danny Kallis, who previously worked alongside Judith Light as a writer/producer on Who's the Boss?

Despite being one of the show's main stars, William Devane did not receive on-screen credit in any of the episodes. Devane was originally slated to get second billing in the cast, between Judith Light and Angela Goethals. He reportedly fought to have top billing, or at least share top billing with Light, in response to his Knots Landing fame. Both the producers and ABC refused to move Devane's billing, believing that Judith Light having sole first billing would draw in more of the female 18-49 demographic that is attractive to advertisers and would bring back ABC viewers who had made Light's previous series, Who's the Boss?, a success. Devane ultimately told the producers that if he couldn't get a billing change, he would rather not be credited at all.

Phenom's theme song, "The Promise and the Prize," was written and performed by Carly Simon. Two versions of the song were used during the program's run, a one-minute version as well as a 30-second version that appeared in select episodes that ran over their allotted time. U.S. Open women's singles and Wimbledon mixed doubles champion Tracy Austin served as the technical consultant for the series. Austin also made a cameo in the series' pilot episode.

== Episodes ==
No.	Title	Directed by	Written by	Original release date	Viewers (millions)
1	"Pilot"	Ed. Weinberger	Dick Blasucci & Marc Flanagan and Sam Simon	September 14, 1993	16.2
Tennis-playing phenom Angela Doolan strives to live her life as a normal 15-year-old, but her dream of being a professional tennis player prevents her from spending time with friends or family. When she is accepted for a scholarship to attend a tennis academy in La Jolla, California, run by Lou Della Rosa, the self-described "greatest damn tennis coach that ever lived", Angela hopes that her mother Dianne will consider the opportunity.
2	"Angela's First Kiss"	Will Mackenzie	Jon Vitti	September 21, 1993	17.4
A popular boy named Jesse invites Angela to be his date to the school dance, but she is in training for a tournament the next day. After Dianne has convinces Lou to let her go, Angela faces some stiff competition when a popular girl makes a move on Jesse. Meanwhile, Lou stays at the house for the evening, helping Dianne look after Mary Margaret and gets on Dianne's nerves in the process.
3	"Secrets"	Will Mackenzie	Adam Chase & Ira Ungerleider	September 28, 1993	19.2
A class assignment has Mary Margaret studying her family for a week, during which the van burns up after Brian accidentally forgets to change the oil and the family is threatened with eviction after Dianne's ex-husband fails to send money to pay the mortgage.
4	"Angela Gets Crushed"	Will Mackenzie	Kathy Ann Stumpe	October 5, 1993	22.8
While leaving from a tennis practice one night, Angela and Brian find that the family van has been broken into and they become the victims of a mugging. Luckily, Patrick (Patrick Cassidy), Angela's soon-to-be new tennis coach rescues them with his strength and his tennis racket; a hero-worshipping Angela starts to develop a crush on Patrick, but Dianne disapproves after he visits the Doolan home and finds out that Patrick is much older than her daughter. Little does Angela know, Patrick is just playing with her emotions to get her to play better. When the truth comes out, Angela does not hold back with the tongue-lashing and fires him on the spot for toying with her and being cruel to her.
5	"Daddy's Home"	Will Mackenzie	Fred Graver	October 12, 1993	21.7
Despite their rocky relationship, Angela's father (John Getz) returns and announces to his daughter and Lou that he plans to take over as her tennis coach to help her further her career.
6	"Game Face"	Will Mackenzie	David Richardson	October 19, 1993	20.5
Lou wants Angela to change her personality in order to help improve her tennis, leading to worry from Dianne. Meanwhile, Brian gets fired from his mini-mart security job on his first day, after the store gets robbed under his watch.
7	"Angela's Wild Ride"	Will Mackenzie	Dick Blasucci & Danny Kallis	October 26, 1993	20.9
When Monica decides to cut class with her boyfriend Tommy, Monica hands Angela her cigarette leading to Angela get caught by Sister Mary, and being sent to the principal (Dan Castellaneta); when Angela covers for her best friend and takes the blame, Dianne questions whether Monica is a good influence on her daughter. Angela makes a serious attempt to try and change her good girl reputation, leading her on a night on the town in a stolen car with Monica, Tommy and one of Tommy's friends that lands them in trouble with the law, and Dianne grounding Angela and forbidding her from seeing Monica anymore. Meanwhile, Brian agonizes over whether he will get accepted into an art school.
8	"Answered Prayers"	Will Mackenzie	Pat Dougherty	November 2, 1993	16.7
After her prayers to avoid having meat loaf for dinner and for Brian to land a new job are answered, Mary Margaret decides to pray for a way out of taking her spelling test at school; after she finds out that her teacher Monsignor McFadden has died, saving her from the test, Mary Margaret starts to feel guilty. Meanwhile, when Lou's new girlfriend Beverly (Lori Alan) tells him that she leaving him for another man over the phone, Angela convinces Dianne to let Lou stay with the Doolans, while he recovers from the breakup.
9	"Crazy for You"	Art Dielhenn	Frank Mula	November 9, 1993	22.9
Dianne has not had time to herself lately, so Lou gives her the address of a spa that he visits often to get away for the weekend, and she can get a 50% discount as long as she mentions Lou's name. While she is there, Dianne gets a shock when she discovers that Lou has arrived at the spa on the same weekend with his new, much younger girlfriend, she then meets a charming man (Robert Klein), who happens to have multiple personalities. Meanwhile back home, Brian takes care of Angela and Mary Margaret for the weekend and must tend to little sister Mary Margaret's scout meetings since Dianne is away, and has to look after Angela, when she catches a cold at the same time she has the weekend off from practicing and playing tennis.
10	"There's No Place Like Home"	Art Dielhenn	Kathy Ann Stumpe	November 16, 1993	23.0
Mary Margaret is anxious to get the lead as Dorothy Gale's in the school production of The Wizard of Oz; when she gets the part, Angela discovers that her major tennis tournament occurs on the same day as Mary Margaret's performance, forcing Angela to back out of seeing her little sister in the play and disappointing her little sister. When the tournament ends earlier than expected, Angela gets Lou to rush her to the school in time for the play, but the two get sidetracked when they get stopped by the police on the way there.
11	"A Lou-Daughter Picnic"	Will Mackenzie	Lawrence Meyers	November 30, 1993	21.5
When Mary-Margaret needs someone to take her to a father-daughter picnic, Lou steps in to help out. Meanwhile, Brian gets a new job as the lobster mascot for a seafood restaurant, and literally gets red in the face when the dye from the costume gets on him; and Angela helps Dianne re-organize the closet and stumbles upon $150 that was left by her father, which Dianne decides to spend.
12	"A Very Doolan Christmas"	Will Mackenzie	David Richardson	December 14, 1993	19.6
Mary Margaret writes a letter to a pen pal about her family's unusual Christmas, in which the Doolans host Lou and his outspoken mother Maureen (Kathleen Freeman) for the holiday. Meanwhile, Brian decides to propose to Roanne, much to the delight of Angela and Mary Margaret, and the shock of Dianne; Angela anticipates what kind of Christmas present Jesse will give her.
13	"Brian and the Tennis Star"	Will Mackenzie	Jon Vitti	January 4, 1994	23.6
Lou's arranges for Marissa Guiteau, an attractive, outgoing French tennis player known for being a party girl, to stay at the Doolan home to keep her away from the L.A. nightlife and keep her focused on the game. Her arrival causes problems for Angela when Marissa flirts with Angela's boyfriend Jesse and repeatedly cheats during their tennis matches; Brian also catches Marissa's eye, at the same time that Roanne decides to take a "trial separation" from Brian because she thinks that he's too sensitive.
14	"My Little Tony"	Will Mackenzie	Adam Chase & Ira Ungerleider	January 11, 1994	21.5
Both Mary Margaret and Angela suffer from boy trouble: a classmate named Tony annoys Mary Margaret, and when she takes Dianne's advice to be nice to him, it backfires when Tony develops a crush on Mary Margaret. Meanwhile, Lou worries that Angela's boyfriend may be diverting her focus from tennis; not knowing this is the reason why Jesse has been acting different around her, she turns to Monica for help.
15	"Men are Dogs"	Art Dielhenn	Fred Graver	February 1, 1994	20.9
Dianne's sister Catherine (Marcia Strassman) moves to Los Angeles after accepting a new job as a federal judge. When Catherine meets her niece's tennis coach Lou, Angela thinks that they would make the perfect couple, but the two get off on the wrong foot; Dianne gets a shock when Catherine suddenly starts a romance with Lou. Meanwhile, Brian's new job at the pet store leads him to start his own dog grooming business.
16	"Spring Break-Out"	Art Dielhenn	Story by : Frank Mula; Teleplay by : Frank Mula & Adam Chase & Ira Ungerleider	February 8, 1994	20.8
Lou thinks that Dianne is coddling Brian, so Lou decides to teach him how to be a man. After showing the results of his man training, Lou sets him up with an employment opportunity as a security guard at the tennis camp, where Angela leads a revolt after Lou's lessons lead to the power of Brian's new job to go to his head. Meanwhile, when Mary Margaret hears Dianne say she wishes that there was a man around the house, Tony and Mary Margaret scheme to set Dianne up with Tony's father. When that doesn't work, Mary Margaret convinces Dianne to go to a "Parents Without Partners" dance at school.
17	"What's in a Vow?"	Art Dielhenn	David Richardson	February 15, 1994	19.6
During career day at Mary-Margaret's school, Dianne's speech about her job as a court reporter follows a speech by famed NBA player Kareem Abdul-Jabbar, when the students aren't enthused over the speech, she realizes that being a court reporter was not the job that she wanted and decides to make changes in her life. It has an unexpected consequence, when Mary Margaret's teacher Sister Felicia decides to give up the sisterhood. Meanwhile, a shirtless Brian finds a way to make money by doing errands for elderly neighbors who find him attractive.
18	"Dianne's Young Buck"	Art Dielhenn	Beverly Donofrio	February 22, 1994	20.4
Brian gets yet another job as a painter, and invites his 29-year-old boss Dave to the house; at the same time, Dianne goes out with a man she finds incredibly boring, Dave ends up saving her from having to go out with the man again to see a lecture on euthanasia. Dave asks Dianne out on a real date to see The Piano, which leads to a May–December romance that Angela disapproves of. Meanwhile in a bit of rebellion, Angela and Monica decide to sneak out to a wild party on Monica's 16th birthday where they unexpectedly run into Dianne.
19	"Angela's Fifteen Minutes"	Art Dielhenn	Steve Sanders	March 15, 1994	19.8
A newspaper wants to do a story on Angela, and interviews the rest of the Doolan family as well. The story ends up being bad press for the whole family when the reporter (Vicki Lewis) misquotes Dianne, Mary Margaret, Monica and Brian in the story, includes some embarrassing things Angela tells the reporter in confidence and criticizes Lou.
20	"It's a Wonderful Mid-Life Crisis"	Art Dielhenn	Dick Blasucci & Kathy Ann Stumpe	April 5, 1994	19.0
When an old friend passes away, Lou has trouble accepting it, sending him into a mid-life crisis and leading him to ask Dianne to have his child. Meanwhile, Brian is picked to be part of a television program focus group to screen a new crime drama series starring former Leave It to Beaver star Jerry Mathers, and gives it a bad review; Brian later finds himself being stalked by Mathers.
21	"Just a Family of Doolans Sittin' Around Talkin'"	Art Dielhenn	Jon Vitti & Fred Graver	May 3, 1994	15.8
The Doolans visit a therapist, after winning a therapy session at a school raffle, and express their secret fantasies. Mary Margaret tells of her dream to be a contestant on Star Search with Ed McMahon, and to have her own talk show (where she dreams that George Burns is a guest); Angela talks about her dream of playing at Wimbledon, where she tells of a scenario of what she fears would happen if she lost; Brian discusses his dream of being a famous speedboat racer, oil baron and expert pool player (and having a full head of hair a la Elvis Presley and finishing the dream by spontaneously breaking into song); finally, the therapist helps Dianne fantasize about flying in an airplane with a suave James Bond-esque superspy.
22	"Strictly Lunchroom"	Danny Kallis	Adam Chase & Ira Ungerleider	May 10, 1994	18.5
Mary Margaret and Tony are paired as partners for a school dance contest, leading Brian to help the kids practice. When Tony unexpectedly decides to quit the competition, Mary Margaret is upset when she is faced with not having to compete without a partner. Meanwhile, after Lou advises Angela to stay home and recuperate after she injures her knee during tennis practice, her friends decide to sneak her out the house without him knowing; Dianne eventually discovers that Angela has been faking her injury since her knee healed three days earlier in order to spend some much-needed time with her friends, leading Angela to admit what she did to Lou, which leads him to let her decide whether she wants to be a regular teenager or continue her training to be a tennis star.

== Awards and nominations ==
Year	Award	Result	Category	Recipient
1994	Young Artist Awards	Nominated	Youth Actress Leading Role in a Television Series	Angela Goethals
1994	Young Artist Awards	Nominated	Best New Television Series	-
1994	Young Artist Awards	Won	Best Actress Under Ten in a Television Series or Show	Ashley Johnson (Tied with Ashley Peldon for Shameful Secrets)
