= Shedding for the Wedding =

2011 American reality television series

- Shedding for the Wedding promo title
- Genre: Reality
- Created by: Julie Plec
- Developed by: Julie Plec; Chuck Hogan
- Presented by: Sara Rue
- Country of origin: United States
- Original language: English
- No. of seasons: 1
- No. of episodes: 8

Production
- Producers: Dave Broome; Rick Hurvitz; Air Shofet
- Production locations: Terranea Resort, Rancho Palos Verdes, CA
- Running time: 40-42 minutes
- Production companies: 25/7 Productions; Breakfast Anytime; Warner Horizon Television; Raquel Productions

Original release
- Network: The CW
- Release: February 23 – April 13, 2011

Shedding for the Wedding is a reality competition series that followed nine overweight couples as they attempted to lose weight and win a dream wedding. The show premiered on Wednesday February 23, 2011, at 9:00 pm Eastern/8:00 pm Central on The CW following the season premiere of America's Next Top Model. The theme song is sung by Tinashe.

== Production ==
On March 11, 2010, The CW announced that it was working on four new reality projects which included Shedding for the Wedding. The project is produced by Raquel Productions with executive producers Dave Broome of The Biggest Loser and Rick Hurvitz and Ari Shofet of Pimp My Ride. On May 20, 2010, at The CW Upfront Presentation in New York, the network announced that Shedding for the Wedding would be part of the network's programming and it will debut in 2011. On August 3, 2010, it was announced that actress and Jenny Craig's spokesperson Sara Rue will be the show's host. The series premiered on February 23, 2011.

Shedding for the Wedding was the lowest-rated network television program of the 2010–2011 season, averaging 1.03 million viewers. It was not renewed for a second season.

== Cast ==
- Sara Rue, host
- Brian Worley, wedding planner.
- Nicky Holender, professional fitness trainer and former soccer player in England and the United States.
- Jennifer Cohan, Fitness and Health expert.
- Ashley Koff, registered dietitian.

== Contestants ==
Team Name	Team Color	Contestants	Age	Starting; Weight (lbs)	Wedding Element(s) Won	Status
Eco-Lovers	Gray	Samantha	22	221	Week 5: Decorations and Details Week 7: Designer Bridal Party Attire Week 8: Dream Wedding Week 8: Toyota Highlander Hybrid Wedding Gift	Week 8: Winner
Eco-Lovers	Gray	Brooks	22	311	Week 5: Decorations and Details Week 7: Designer Bridal Party Attire Week 8: Dream Wedding Week 8: Toyota Highlander Hybrid Wedding Gift	Week 8: Winner
Fun & Games	Purple	Dawn	27	180	Week 4: Wedding Rings Week 6: Catering Week 7: Designer Bridal Party Attire	Week 8: Runner-Up
Fun & Games	Purple	Adam	30	232	Week 4: Wedding Rings Week 6: Catering Week 7: Designer Bridal Party Attire	Week 8: Runner-Up
Fairy Tale	White	Allison	28	167	Week 2: Wedding Cake Week 7: Designer Bridal Party Attire	Week 7: Eliminated
Fairy Tale	White	David	25	260	Week 2: Wedding Cake Week 7: Designer Bridal Party Attire	Week 7: Eliminated
Football	Green	Laura	26	197		Week 6: Eliminated (Married Before Finale)
Football	Green	Austin	26	270		Week 6: Eliminated (Married Before Finale)
Big Band	Yellow	Valerie	23	230	Week 3: Flowers Week 8: Dream Honeymoon to St. Croix	Week 5: Eliminated
Big Band	Yellow	Dave	27	387	Week 3: Flowers Week 8: Dream Honeymoon to St. Croix	Week 5: Eliminated
Greek Week	Orange	Lindsey	23	203		Week 4: Eliminated (Married Before Finale)
Greek Week	Orange	Chase	24	310		Week 4: Eliminated (Married Before Finale)
Gamers	Brown	Taylor	23	232		Week 3: Eliminated
Gamers	Brown	Peter	28	210		Week 3: Eliminated
Hollywood	Red	Laeresa	25	215	Week 1: Dream Dress and Tux	Week 2: Eliminated
Hollywood	Red	Stephen	24	265	Week 1: Dream Dress and Tux	Week 2: Eliminated
Beach Romance	Pink	Ginny	26	179		Week 1: Eliminated (Did Not Attend Finale)
Beach Romance	Pink	Marc	36	243		Week 1: Eliminated (Did Not Attend Finale)

== Weight loss graph ==
Team name	Team Starting Weight	Week								Team Weight lost	Team percentage lost
Team name	Team Starting Weight	1	2	3	4	5	6	7	8	Team Weight lost	Team percentage lost
Eco-Lovers	532	505	494	489	479	466	452	441	371	161	30.26%
Fun & Games	412	382	378	374	361	352	345	335	300	112	27.18%
Fairy Tale	427	402	396	393	387	377	369	366	330	97	22.72%
Football	467	444	435	430	418	410	405		367	100	21.41%
Big Band	617	579	573	568	556	545			422	195	31.60%
Greek Week	513	493	476	471	462				419	94	18.32%
Gamers	442	417	413	412					344	98	22.17%
Hollywood	480	455	451						398	82	17.08%
Beach Romance	422	402							N/A	20	4.74%

The Couple Competed in the "Til Death Do Us Part" Challenge and Won
The Couple Competed in the "Til Death Do Us Part" Challenge and was Eliminated
The Couple was Eliminated, but came back for the Final Weigh In
The Couple was Eliminated, and did not come back for the Final Weigh In
Eliminated Couple who Lost the most Weight at Home to Win the Dream Honeymoon
Engaged Couple Finalist and Runner-Up for the Dream Wedding
Engaged Couple Finalist and Winner of the Dream Wedding

== Ratings ==
The show began on February 23, 2011, on the CW. With the initial ratings hourly - 0.7/1, adults 18–49, - 0.5/1, adults 18–34, - 0.6/2 and woman 18-43 earning a - 1.0/3 share. It was ranked as the least watched show among all five broadcast networks for the 2010–2011 season, with an average of 1.04 million viewers and a 0.5 rating in adults 18–49.

Episode	U.S. Air Date	Rating/Share (18-49)	Viewers (Millions)
"Dearly Beloved, We Are Gathered Here..."	February 23, 2011	0.5/1	1.07
"Its a Piece Of Cake"	March 2, 2011	0.4/1	1.06
"Flower Power"	March 9, 2011	0.4/1	0.92
"The Ring's Is The Thing"	March 16, 2011	0.4/1	0.97
"The Devil's in the Details"	March 23, 2011	0.4/1	0.97
"Makeover week"	March 30, 2011	0.4/1	0.92
"For Better, for Worse, for Richer, for Poorer, in Sickness and in Health..."	April 6, 2011	0.3/1	0.84
"Ladies and Gentleman, Introducing Mr. & Mrs...?"	April 13, 2011	0.5/1	1.24

== Syndication ==
Oxygen Network ran a marathon of the first seven episodes on April 9, 2011. Despite the show's cancellation, CW aired repeats during summer 2011 on Tuesdays at 8:00pm.
