= Traitor in My House =

1990 television film

Traitor in My House (1990) is a 50-minute made-for-TV film that tells the story of Elizabeth Van Lew, a Union sympathizer who lived in Richmond, Virginia during the Civil War. The story is told through the eyes of Van Lew's niece, Louise Van Lew (age 12).

Traitor in My House stars Mary Kay Place, Charles S. Dutton, Harris Yulin, and Angela Goethals. It was directed by Nell Cox and produced by the Educational Film Center. Cate Adair provided costume design.

The film's broadcast debut was on February 24, 1990, as the 6th episode of the 6th season of the PBS series WonderWorks.
