= Rocket Gibraltar =

1988 film by Daniel Petrie

- Theatrical release poster
- Directed by: Daniel Petrie
- Written by: Amos Poe
- Produced by: Geoffrey Mayo; Robert Fisher
- Starring: Burt Lancaster
- Cinematography: Jost Vacano
- Edited by: Melody London
- Music by: Andrew Powell
- Distributed by: Columbia Pictures
- Release date: September 2, 1988
- Running time: 99 minutes
- Country: United States
- Language: English
- Budget: $3 million
- Box office: $187,349

Rocket Gibraltar is a 1988 American drama film directed by Daniel Petrie and starring Burt Lancaster, Suzy Amis Cameron, Patricia Clarkson, Frances Conroy, Sinead Cusack, John Glover, Bill Pullman, Kevin Spacey and Macaulay Culkin in his film debut.

== Plot ==
Levi Rockwell is a retired, widowed Hollywood screenwriter and patriarch who reunites his entire family at his Long Island estate for his 77th birthday, but personal and social problems abound. His four children - son Rolo, and daughters Ruby, Rose, and Aggie - arrive, along with their spouses and children, to help him celebrate his 77th birthday. During the course of the family reunion he bonds with his youngest grandson, 4-year-old Blue. One afternoon, Blue brings his grandfather some lemonade. Blue sees a scale model ship and Levi explains that it's a Viking ship. Later that evening, Blue and his older cousins are discussing what to get grandpa for his 77th birthday. While bike riding, Blue and his cousins see a boat in the tall grass. They decide to restore it as a birthday present for their grandfather.

Levi's health begins to fail, and he voices a sentimental request that he be given a Viking funeral after his death. With his adult children consumed by their own personal worries, his 7 grandchildren honor Levi's last wish.

== Cast ==
- Burt Lancaster as Levi Rockwell
- John Glover as Rolo Rockwell
- Sinéad Cusack as Amanda "Billi" Rockwell
- Frances Conroy as Ruby Hanson
- Kevin Spacey as Dwayne Hanson
- Patricia Clarkson as Rose Black
- Bill Pullman as Crow Black
- Suzy Amis Cameron as Aggie Rockwell
- Sara Rue as Jessica Hanson
- Angela Goethals as Dawn Black
- Macaulay Culkin as Cy Blue Black
- David Hyde Pierce as Monsieur Henri
