= Stealing Christmas =

2003 television film by Gregg Champion

- Home video cover art
- Genre: Comedy; Crime; Drama; Romance
- Screenplay by: Lloyd 'Lucky' Gold (as Lloyd Gold)
- Story by: Gregg Taylor
- Directed by: Gregg Champion
- Starring: Tony Danza; Lea Thompson; Angela Goethals
- Music by: Joseph Conlan
- Country of origin: United States
- Original language: English

Production
- Executive producer: Raffaella De Laurentiis
- Producers: Gregg Champion; Oscar L. Costo
- Cinematography: Gordon Lonsdale
- Editor: Anita Brandt Burgoyne
- Running time: 89 minutes
- Production companies: Raffaella Productions; USA Cable Entertainment

Original release
- Network: USA Network
- Release: November 30, 2003

Stealing Christmas is an American made for television comedy-drama film directed by Gregg Champion and starring Tony Danza, Lea Thompson and Angela Goethals. It premiered on USA Network on November 30, 2003. It was later broadcast in the 25 Days of Christmas programming block on ABC Family (now Freeform) and in 2020 it was part of Freeform's Kickoff to Christmas.

== Plot ==
A burglar (Tony Danza) plans a bank heist in a small town on Christmas Eve, but experiences a change of heart after he takes a job playing Santa Claus.

== Cast ==
- Tony Danza as Jack Clayton
- Lea Thompson as Sarah Gibson
- Angela Goethals as Noelle Gibson
- Betty White as Emily Sutton
- David Parker as Harry Zordich
- Malcolm Stewart as Doug Jennings
- Alf Humphreys as Tim Hogan (as Alfred E. Humphreys)
- Gwynyth Walsh as Jo
- Damon Gregory as Store Guard
- Dean Redman as Store Guard
- Brad Sihvon as Store Guard
- Terry Howson as Store Guard
- Beverly Elliott as Woman Outside Store
- Michael Scholar Jr. as Bus Ticket Seller
- Richard Hendery as Bus Driver
- Ryan Steele as Teenager on Bus
- Alvin Sanders as Cook
- Ryan Hirakida as Pudgy Kid
- Isabelle Deluce as Girl #1
- Owen Seidel as Crying Kid
- Lisa Bunting as School Teacher
- Effi Markovitch as Gary Tannenbaum
- Spancer Achtymichuk as Andrew
- Alexis Llewellyn as Girl #2
- Cameron Cowles as Kid
- Avery Marte as Kid
- Michaela Slinger as Kid
- Avery Tiplady as Kid
- Kayden Porbeni as Kid
- Zachary Bergman as Kid
- Julia Tortolano as Kid
- Nico McEown as Kid
- Don Mackay as Bank Manager
- Howard Storey as Bank Guard
- Colin Cunningham as Mall Security Guard
- Terry O'Sullivan as Bank Teller
- Cameron Park as Policeman
- Perry Finnbogason as Little Boy with Glasses
- Jodie Graham as Boy's Father
- French Tickner as Minister
- John Carroll as Judge
- D. Harlan Cutshall as Prison Guard
- Rob Morton as Prison Guard

== See also ==
- List of American films of 2003
- List of Christmas films
- Santa Claus in film
