= Angela Goethals =

American actress (born 1977)

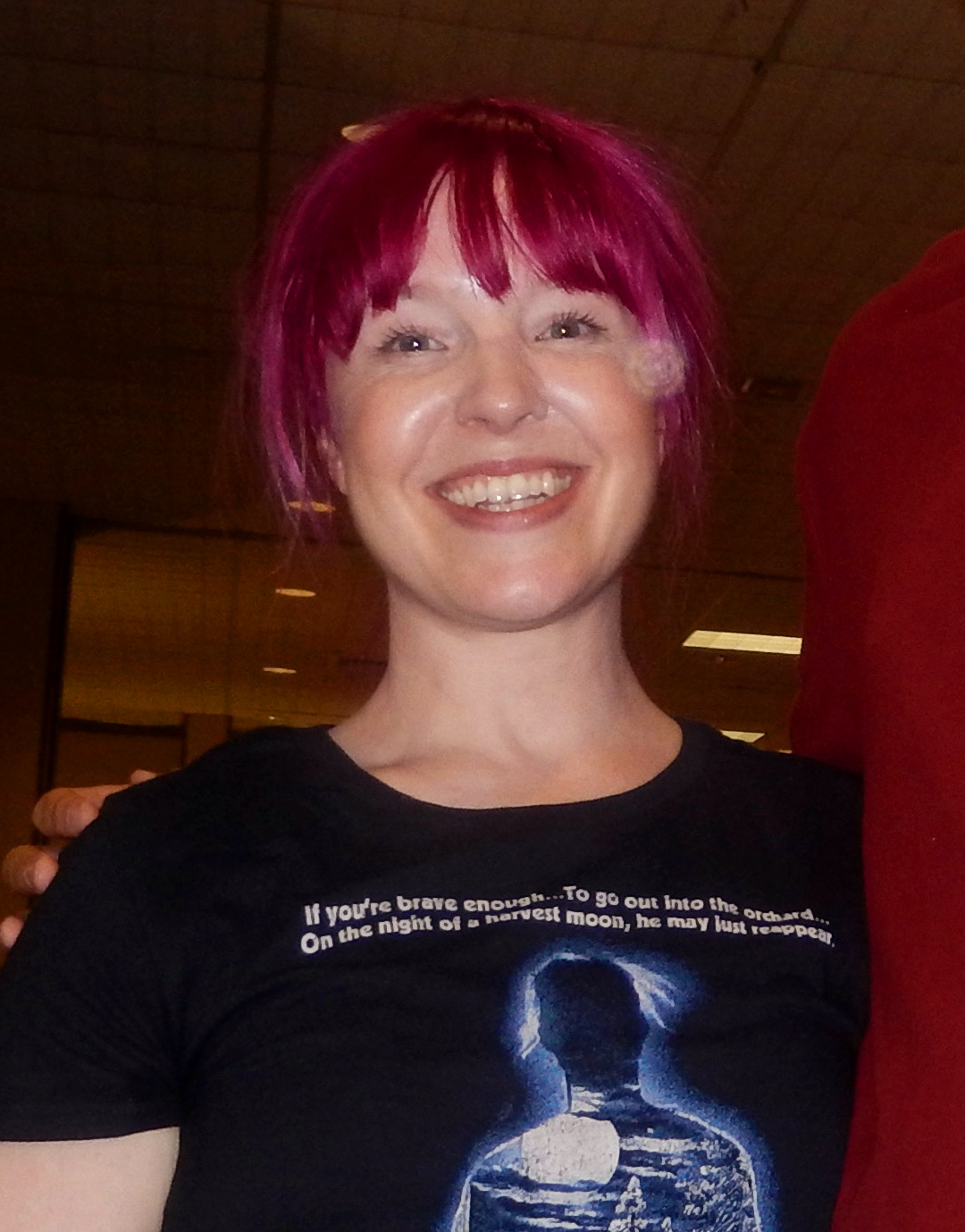
- Goethals in 2019
- Born: Angela Bethany Goethals; May 20, 1977 (age 49); New York City, New York, U.S.
- Education: Vassar College
- Occupation: Actress
- Years active: 1987–present
- Notable work: Home Alone, Jerry Maguire, Behind the Mask: The Rise of Leslie Vernon

Angela Bethany Goethals (/ˈɡoʊθəlz/ GOH-thəlz; born May 20, 1977) is an American film, television and stage actress. Goethals made her acting debut as a child actor in the 1987 Broadway production of Coastal Disturbances, and was 14-years-old when she won the Obie Award for Distinguished Performance by an Actress, for her portrayal of Edna Arkins in the 1991 Off-Broadway production of The Good Times Are Killing Me. She played the sister of Macaulay Culkin's character in Home Alone (1990), and went on to star in several independent films and television shows, including the title role on the short-lived sitcom Phenom (1993), as well as a small role in Jerry Maguire (1996).

In 1999, Goethals graduated from Vassar College with a A.B. in French before returning to acting. In 2005, she landed a recurring guest appearance on 24, and also gained recognition and critical acclaim for her starring role in the black comedy horror mockumentary Behind the Mask: The Rise of Leslie Vernon (2006). Her last appearance was in the 2018 short film, P.T.A-Holes.

== Early life ==
Goethals was born and raised in New York City, the daughter of Rosalind, a teacher who raised Angela and her sister Sara. She is a great-great-granddaughter of George Washington Goethals, the chief engineer of the Panama Canal, and namesake of New York's Goethals Bridge.

Goethals was introduced to the acting world by actress Jeanie Hackett, a family friend, who took her to several auditions. In 1986, at the age of nine, she got her first professional acting job, as the understudy to Sarah Michelle Gellar in The Widow Claire, an off-Broadway play written by Horton Foote. Two years later Goethals appeared as the daughter of Edwin Booth, portrayed by David Strathairn, in a workshop production of Booth: A House Divided, at The Players, New York City.

Goethals attended Stuyvesant High School.

== Career ==
Goethals' first movie role was in Rocket Gibraltar in 1988. Her sister Sara also had a small part. Later that same year, she appeared in Heartbreak Hotel, a film about the fictional kidnapping of Elvis Presley.

Goethals's first starring role came in the 1993 TV series Phenom. She played Angela Doolan, a young tennis player struggling with the challenges of life. It ran for 22 episodes before being cancelled by network ABC in May 1994.

In 1990, Goethals played Linnie, the sister of main character Kevin McCallister (Macaulay Culkin), in Home Alone. Goethals was one of only three main cast members not to return in the sequel, Home Alone 2: Lost in New York, two years later. She appeared in 1996's Jerry Maguire, playing Kathy Sanders, Jerry's client who fakes tears when he calls her to inform her of his departure from the agency.

In 1999, Goethals graduated from the private liberal arts college, Vassar, with a bachelor's degree in French, in which she is fluent, and she rode in the IHSA Zone II Region 1 at the Advanced Walk-Trot-Canter level. In February 2002, she moved back to Los Angeles to pursue film and television. That year, she starred as Polly in Comedy Central's first original movie, Porn 'n Chicken. named for the club at Yale University that made headlines in 2001 when members announced plans to make their own porn film. Later in 2002, she starred in the sitcom Do Over, playing the sister of the lead character who is catapulted back in time to 1981. Between 2003 and 2004, Goethals made guest appearances on single episodes of Boston Public, Six Feet Under and Without a Trace, as well as playing a minor role in the Adam Sandler romantic comedy, Spanglish.

In 2005, Goethals made a recurring guest appearance on the TV show 24. She played Maya Driscoll, the mentally ill daughter of then Director of CTU Los Angeles, Erin Driscoll. She went on to make guest appearances on Grey's Anatomy, CSI, and Crossing Jordan.

== Filmography ==
=== Film ===
Angela Goethals film credits
Year	Title	Role	Notes
1988	Rocket Gibraltar	Dawn Black	
1988	Heartbreak Hotel	Pam Wolfe	
1990	Home Alone	Linnie McCallister	
1991	Triple Bogey on a Par Five Hole	Bree Levy	
1991	V.I. Warshawski	Katherine "Kat" Grafalk	
1996	Jerry Maguire	Kathy Sanders	
2001	Storytelling	Elli	"Fiction" segment
2002	Changing Lanes	Sarah Windsor	
2003	Stealing Christmas	Noelle Gibson	
2004	Spanglish	Gwen	
2006	Behind the Mask: The Rise of Leslie Vernon	Taylor Gentry	
2018	P.T.A-Holes	Mona	Short film

=== Television ===
Angela Goethals television credits
Year	Title	Role	Notes
1989	The Equalizer	Amber Sweeny	Episode: "Starfire"
1990	Traitor in My House	Louise Van Lew	TV movie
1993–94	Phenom	Angela Doolan	Main cast, title role
2000	Madigan Men	Sara	Episode: "Three Guys, a Girl, and a Conversation Nook"
2002	The Education of Max Bickford	Danielle Hodges	Episode: "One More Time"
2002	Porn 'n Chicken	Polly	TV movie
2002–03	Do Over	Cheryl Larsen	Main cast
2003	Boston Public	Sheila Mercer	Episode: "Chapter Fifty-Seven"
2003	Miss Match	Jessica	Episode: "Santa, Baby"
2003	Stealing Christmas	Noelle Gibson	TV movie
2003	The Brotherhood of Poland, New Hampshire	Katie Shaw	Main cast
2004	Six Feet Under	Cindy	Episode: "Falling into Place"
2004	Without a Trace	Kelly Corcoran	Episode: "In the Dark"
2005	24	Maya Driscoll	Recurring role (Season 4)
2005	Clubhouse	Sister Hillary	Episode: "Old Timers Day"
2005	Grey's Anatomy	Kelly Roesch	Episode: "Make Me Lose Control"
2005	CSI: Crime Scene Investigation	Suzie Gables	Episode: "Dog Eat Dog"
2006	Crossing Jordan	Deborah	Episode: "Thin Ice"
2007	Boston Legal	Officer Ellen Belott	Episode: "Guantanamo by the Bay"
2009	Life	Patty York	Episode: "Mirror Ball"
2010	Law & Order	Maura Scott	Episode: "Rubber Room"
2010	Royal Pains	Ginnie	Episode: "Whole Lotto Love"

== Theatre ==
- Coastal Disturbances (Broadway, 1987) .... Miranda Bigelow
- Approaching Zanzibar (Off-Broadway, 1989) .... Pony Blossom
- The Good Times Are Killing Me (Off-Broadway, 1991) .... Edna Arkins
- Four Baboons Adoring the Sun (Broadway, 1992) .... Halcy
- Picnic (Broadway, 1994) .... Millie Owens
- Hazelwood Jr. High (Off-Broadway, 1998)
- True History and Real Adventures (Off-Broadway, 1999)
- Be Aggressive (2001) .... Hannah
- Blur (2001) .... Dot DiPrima
- The Mandrake Root (2001) .... Kate Randall/Young Man
- As You Like It (2002) .... Rosalind
- House of Blue Leaves (2008) .... Little Nun
- Who's Afraid of Virginia Woolf? (Off-Broadway, 2009) .... Honey
- Nothing Sacred (2010) .... Becky Shaw
- Long Day's Journey into Night (2017) .... Kathleen

== Awards and nominations ==
In 1991, she was nominated for a Drama Desk Award, and won the Obie Award for Distinguished Performance by an Actress, for her portrayal of Edna Arkins in the Off-Broadway production, The Good Times Are Killing Me.

She was nominated four times to a Young Artist Award at the Young Artist Awards: in 1989 for Best Young Actress in a Motion Picture Comedy or Fantasy for Heartbreak Hotel (1988), in 1991 for Best Young Actress Supporting Role in a Motion Picture for Home Alone (1990), in 1992 for Best Young Actress Starring in a Motion Picture for V.I. Warshawski (1991) and in 1994 for Youth Actress Leading Role in a Television Series for Phenom (1993).
