= Leslie Greif =

American film director

Leslie Greif (born July 30, 1954) is an American director, writer, and film and television producer.

== Career ==
Greif began his career as an NBC page out of NBC-Burbank. He later was a producer with the television series Sins in 1986.

Greif's first film as a director was Keys to Tulsa in 1997. The film was not well received by critics.

In 2007 he both wrote the screenplay and directed the comedy film 10 Rules for Sleeping Around.

Greif's some other works include Walker Texas Ranger (1993–2001), Meet Wally Sparks (1997), Monday Night Mayhem (2002), Gene Simmons Family Jewels (2006–2012), Funny Money (2006), Brando (2007), Hatfields & McCoys (2012), Texas Rising (2015), Sun Records (2017), The Offer (2022), The Gray House (2026) and High Value Target: The Hunt for Saddam (2026). He has worked extensively in TV mini-series, reality television, full-length features and scripted television. Greif's production team includes Adam Reed, Adam Freeman, Herb Nanas, Joanne Rubino and Aaron Semmel at his production company ThinkFactory Media in Santa Monica. In 2012, Hatfields & McCoys, for which Greif was executive producer, won two Primetime Emmy Awards (Kevin Costner for Outstanding Lead Actor in a Miniseries or a Movie and Tom Berenger for Outstanding Supporting Actor in a Miniseries or a Movie).
