= Green Pastures (Austin, Texas) =

Historic house in Texas, United States

- U.S. National Register of Historic Places
- Recorded Texas Historic Landmark
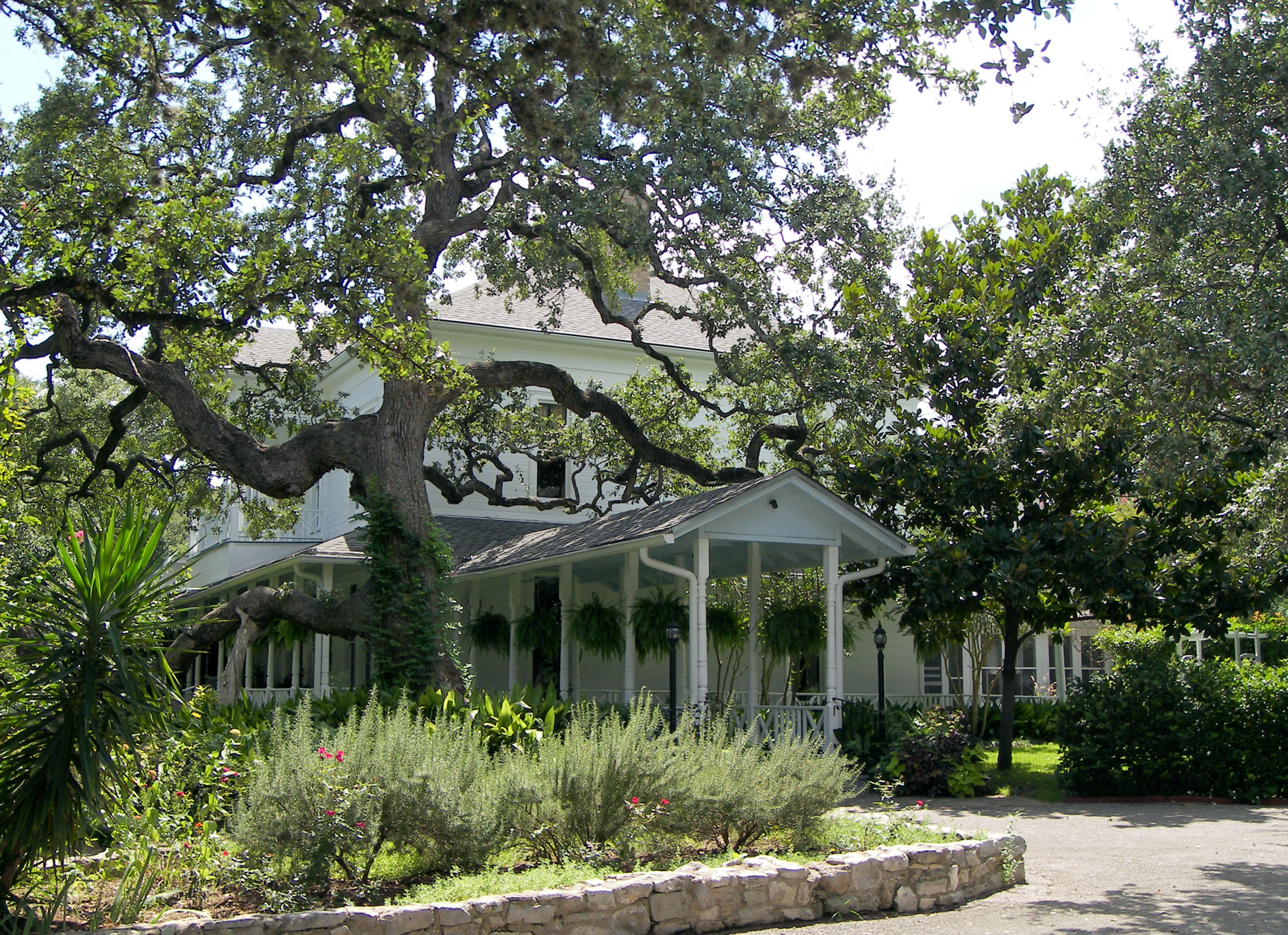
- Location: Austin, Texas, United States
- Coordinates: 30°14′42″N 97°45′44″W
- Built: 1895
- Architect: Marion Hall
- NRHP reference No.: 80004154
- RTHL No.: 6444

Significant dates
- Added to NRHP: September 27, 1980
- Designated RTHL: 1976

Green Pastures is a historic Victorian home housing a restaurant of the same name in south Austin, Texas neighborhood of Bouldin Creek.

Completed in 1895 by local minister E.W. Herndon, the house sat on 23 acres (93,000 m^{2}) bordering a wooded area to the south. It was home to a number of families over the years. The Green Pastures restaurant opened in the building in 1946, serving a range of comfort food, and was notable for serving to customers of all races, 18 years before other establishments in Austin were desegregated by law.

The building is located at 811 West Live Oak Avenue. It was added to the National Register of Historic Places in 1980.

Location for the 1988 film Heartbreak Hotel and childhood residence of the activist, author and radio show host John Henry Faulk.

Green Pastures Restaurant was established by Mary Faulk Koock and husband Chester Koock. Mary wrote historical collection of recipes 'The Texas Cookbook' with the help of the author James Beard.

The grounds have been noted for decades for its beautiful peafowl.
