= Impastor =

American sitcom

- Genre: Sitcom
- Created by: Christopher Vane
- Starring: Michael Rosenbaum; Sara Rue; Mircea Monroe; David Rasche; Mike Kosinski
- Composer: Danny Lux
- Country of origin: United States
- Original language: English
- No. of seasons: 2
- No. of episodes: 20

Production
- Executive producers: Christopher Vane; Rob Greenberg; Eric Tannenbaum; Kim Tannenbaum; Michael Rosenbaum
- Camera setup: Single-camera
- Running time: 20 minutes
- Production companies: TV Land Original Productions; CBS Television Studios; The Tannenbaum Company; All In Vane

Original release
- Network: TV Land
- Release: July 15, 2015 – December 7, 2016

Impastor is an American sitcom created by Christopher Vane. The series stars Michael Rosenbaum, who also serves as executive producer alongside Vane, Eric Tannenbaum and Kim Tannenbaum. Impastor premiered on July 15, 2015, on TV Land. The series was renewed for a second season which began airing on September 28, 2016.

On December 13, 2016, TV Land canceled the series after two seasons.

== Plot ==
Impastor follows Buddy Dobbs (Michael Rosenbaum), a slacker and gambling addict who, to hide from a pair of loan sharks, ends up stealing the identity of a recently deceased gay Lutheran pastor who was relocating to Ladner, a small-town community outside of Portland, Oregon. He hopes to keep up the ruse long enough to make the money necessary to flee Ladner, but he is inspired to stay after helping a mother and a rebellious son as well as seeing how the townspeople get along peacefully. While trying to decide between both lives, he struggles to keep his past a secret.

== Cast ==
=== Main cast ===
- Michael Rosenbaum as Buddy Dobbs, a slacker and gambling addict who faked his own death and is now posing as gay Lutheran pastor Jonathan Barlow to hide from loan sharks. Upon assuming this identity, Buddy asks the citizens of Ladner to informally address him as "Buddy," lying and stating that it is a nickname.
- Sara Rue as Dora Winston, Buddy's conservative, perpetually cheerful assistant. She hides her feelings, choosing to acquiesce to others, saying of herself, "My face says nothing about my feelings." She admits she is a pushover. Dora and Russell Kerry are former high school classmates.
- David Rasche as Alden Schmidt, president of Ladner Trinity Lutheran Church who often opposes Buddy's unconventional means of managing the congregation. He finds his marriage to his long-time wife has become "bland" and wishes to pursue a relationship with Ashlee, whom he finds out is a sex worker at the start of the second season.
- Mircea Monroe as Alexa Cummings, the beautiful and highly intelligent treasurer of Trinity Lutheran and owner of a local fashion boutique. She rivals Russell for Buddy's romantic attention. Over the series, is revealed that she was born Christina Burke. She was a teenaged runaway in Boston who hooked up with hardened criminal Kenny, inadvertently assisting him in a bank robbery twelve years earlier. She got a fresh start by changing her name from Christina Burke, married Kurt, an abusive alcoholic, whom she fled from four years before the series. She moves to Ladner for another fresh start, where she later murders a man, starts having sex with her pastor, then murders another man.
- Mike Kosinski as Russell Kerry, secretary of Ladner Trinity Lutheran Church. He is gay and rivals Alexa for Buddy's romantic attention. His parents are unaware that he is gay until Buddy inadvertently outs him in "Honor Thy Boyfriend's Mother and Father". Despite Russell's fears, his parents ultimately accept the revelation with minimal conflict and express their happiness when Russell pretends he and Buddy are in a monogamous relationship. His name is based on that of actress Keri Russell.

=== Recurring cast ===
- Aimee Garcia as Leeane, a bartender and Buddy's ex-girlfriend. She believes he committed suicide. Though she admits at his memorial service that she loves Buddy, she believes that the pair are still not right for one another.
- Matthew Kevin Anderson and Jonathon Young as Detectives Lovello and Hyde, two officers investigating Buddy's disappearance and apparent suicide. They are unsuccessful in their dealings with Leeane; Lovello is more interested in flirting, and Hyde is tactless and unskilled as he is an officer through nepotism.
- Lindsey Gort as Ashlee, a sex worker hired by Buddy who later captures Alden's affection
- Hal Ozsan as Kenny Banderas, Alexa's ex-boyfriend described by Alexa as "violent" and "mentally unstable." He and Alexa met in Boston, and the two robbed a bank with Alexa acting as the getaway driver. Kenny was arrested and served twelve years in prison before receiving parole. He hoped Alexa would wait for him and feels betrayed she has not. In "Honor Thy Boyfriend's Mother and Father", he is shot and killed after pulling a gun on Buddy, who hides the body in a local lake. Though Kenny's body is found a week later, Buddy and Alexa convince the town that his death was a suicide.
- Bonita Friedericy as Hilva Schmidt, Alden's cold and overbearing wife
- Colin Lawrence as Damien, the loan shark from whom Buddy is trying to hide. He is shot and killed in the season 2 episode "Guardian Angel".
- Reynaldo Gallegos as Ray Florez, a longtime cellmate of Kenny Banderas. He is released from prison in season 2 and tracks down Alexa for the stolen money. He is shot and killed by Jasmine (after being set up by Buddy) in the season 2 episode "Sins of the Past-or Part 2".
- Mekia Cox as Jasmine, an associate of Damien's. She locates Buddy shortly after Damien's death, wanting to know what happened to her colleague.
- Adrian Holmes as Federal Agent Landecker
- Saidah Arrika Ekulona as Sheriff Rashida Graham

== Development and production ==
On April 15, 2014, TV Land placed a cast-contingent pilot order on Impastor, with Christopher Vane attached to pen the script and executive produce alongside Eric Tannenbaum and Kim Tannenbaum via The Tannenbaum Company and CBS Television Studios.

Casting announcements began in June 2014, with Michael Rosenbaum first to be cast, in the role of Buddy Dobbs, the gambling, pot-smoking protagonist. Sara Rue was the next actor cast in the series regular role of Dora, a gossip and the assistant to the pastor. Shortly afterwards, Mircea Monroe and Aimee Garcia were cast in the series, with Monroe cast in the role of Alexa Cummings, the gorgeous treasurer who finds herself attracted to Buddy. Garcia was tapped to play the role of LeeAnne, Buddy's bartender ex-girlfriend, that he left behind. David Rasche then joined the series as Alden Schmidt, the church president who is suspicious of Buddy. Mike Kosinski was the last actor cast in the series regular role of Russell Kerry, the young secretary who is excited about the arrival of a gay pastor.

On October 1, 2014, TV Land placed a 10-episode series order on Impastor, which premiered on July 15, 2015. On August 31, 2015, TV Land renewed Impastor for a second season, which premiered on September 28, 2016. On December 13, 2016, one week after the second season ended, TV Land canceled the series.

== Episodes ==
=== Series overview ===
Season	Episodes	Originally released	
Season	Episodes	First released	Last released
1	10	July 15, 2015	September 16, 2015
2	10	September 28, 2016	December 7, 2016

=== Season 1 (2015) ===
No. overall	No. in season	Title	Directed by	Written by	Original release date	US viewers (millions)
1	1	"Genesis"	Rob Greenberg	Christopher Vane	July 15, 2015	1.15
Threatened by loan sharks and having been dumped by his girlfriend Leeane, slacker and gambling addict Buddy Dobbs decides to commit suicide by jumping off a bridge. A passing motorist, Jonathan Barlow (Michael Bean), tries to intervene, but winds up accidentally falling to his own death. Buddy gets in the man's car and decides to assume Jonathan's identity. He finds out the man was on his way to a new job in a small town. When he arrives, Buddy learns Jonathan was not only supposed to be the new pastor at the town's Lutheran church but also was gay. Buddy hopes to keep up the ruse only long enough to empty Jonathan's bank account. However, he is inspired to stay after helping both a local mom and the son of Alden Schmidt, the skeptical church president.
2	2	"On the Third Day..."	Rob Greenberg	Christopher Vane	July 22, 2015	1.06
As a storm brews outside, two thugs show up at the pastor's house and throw Buddy into the trunk of a car. After Buddy prays for help, a tree is blown over and falls on the car, killing the thugs. Alden's suspicions are raised when a cop shows up saying there was a scrap of paper in the crushed car with the pastor's address on it. Later, Buddy learns that Leeane is holding a memorial service for him, and he sneaks in to see who attends.
3	3	"Bird of Pray"	Rob Greenberg	Alan R. Cohen & Alan Freedland	July 29, 2015	1.02
Dora catches Buddy in bed with someone she assumes is a man under the covers, and Buddy lets her believe it, even though it is really a female prostitute, Ashlee (Lindsey Gort). Unprepared for his first sermon, Buddy improvises with some bits he learned while watching late-night TV evangelists. Alden is not pleased, and calls in the area bishop. Meanwhile, Hyde and Lovello, the detectives working on Buddy's disappearance case, discover through DNA that the faceless body they found in the river is not Buddy's.
4	4	"Thou Shalt Not Steal"	Victor Nelli Jr.	Tod Himmel	August 5, 2015	0.96
Buddy steals a ruby necklace from a woman's casket to pay off a gambling debt and, upon learning the ruby is fake, gifts it to Dora. However, the woman's family recognizes it, and he must return it to the casket by morning. Alden becomes smitten with Ashlee, raising tensions in his stagnant marriage. Alexa holds her annual charity fashion show and hurts Dora by mistaking her hand-knit ponchos for tablecloths. To Alexa's dismay, Kenny (Hal Ozsan), a man from her past, reenters her life.
5	5	"Ex Communication"	Clark Mathis	Christopher Vane	August 12, 2015	0.97
Kenny is upset Alexa did not wait for him while he was imprisoned for 12 years and demands she pay back the money he left behind. Alexa insists she did not take any money. Dora prepares a wedding dress for her ex-fiance's wedding. Because she fears she will never have her dream wedding, Buddy suggests she go to a bar to meet someone. She returns home drunk and ruins the dress. Buddy and Alexa are forced to hide in a motel for a night after Buddy enrages Kenny. Alexa admits she and Kenny robbed a bank 12 years ago and says her real name is Christina Burke. In the morning, they lure Kenny to the motel, where Buddy lies and says he called Kenny's parole officer. Buddy gives him two choices: stay and get arrested or leave town and outrun the police. Kenny takes a third option and starts fighting Buddy. A single gunshot is heard.
6	6	"Honor Thy Boyfriend's Father and Mother"	Clark Mathis	Ryan Raddatz	August 19, 2015	0.97
Kenny pulls a gun on Buddy and is shot and killed in the ensuing struggle. Unable to simply leave the body, Buddy dumps Kenny in a local lake. While doing so, Alden spots him from a distance, and Buddy pretends he is performing a baptism. Buddy later inadvertently outs Russell to Russell's parents. To help the parents adjust to the revelation, Buddy agrees to have dinner with them, only to learn Russell told them he and Buddy are in a monogamous relationship. Though Russell's parents are happy about the relationship, his father, a retired FBI agent, scares Buddy by running a background check on Barlow, forcing Buddy to break up the fake relationship and thus negate the need for the check. When an erotic novel that opens with a vividly-detailed female masturbation scene becomes popular, Alexa learns that Dora has never masturbated. On Alexa's advice, Dora buys a Bluetooth-operated vibrator, which Alden inadvertently activates during a book club meeting. Fishermen discover Kenny's body.
7	7	"The Body of Kenny Compels You"	Jay Karas	Rob Sheridan	August 26, 2015	0.99
An eleven-year-old boy takes a photo of Buddy having sex with Ashlee and uses it to blackmail Buddy into helping him fondle Dora's breasts. Ashlee leaves her phone number on the note Alden wrote to her. Alden buys a burner phone, but struggles to contact her without alerting anyone to his attempt at an affair. The discovery of Kenny's body has Alden suspicious of Buddy. However, Buddy points out to Alden that his presence at the lake at the time of the murder, lack of a strong alibi, and a burner phone may make him a person of interest should he go to police. Buddy and Alexa then convince Alden that Kenny committed suicide. Buddy plants Kenny's gun in the lake, Alden anonymously tips the police, and the police reach the same conclusion. Lovello and Hyde, through dental records, identify Barlow's body. They still believe the death a suicide.
8	8	"Bingo Tell It on the Mountain"	Jay Karas	Gracie Glassmeyer	September 2, 2015	0.45
Dora asks Buddy to help her overcome her bingo addiction, but she winds up fueling Buddy's addiction in the process. Alden spends more time with Ashlee. A rich couple from Barlow's previous parish moves to Ladner. Russell and Alexa try to woo the couple away from a rival church, and arrange a meeting with Buddy at Ladner Trinity. Buddy has to pretend to be the church janitor and manages to talk the couple out of becoming members of his church. Damien, a loan shark who is owed $32,000 from Buddy, sends a mysterious woman on a mission to find him.
9	9	"Flings & Arrows"	Clark Mathis	Alan R. Cohen & Alan Freedland	September 9, 2015	0.80
Alexa learns that Buddy visited a strip club. Buddy says he went there to "save souls", but Alexa makes it known that she's available if he is secretly interested in women. Hilva becomes convinced that her husband Alden is having an affair with Dora after seeing him coach Dora in archery. A box of Barlow's personal items arrives, and Buddy learns from an itemized list that Barlow's passport is in a jacket he has just given to Russell. When Russell says he gave the jacket to a seamstress, Buddy breaks into the old woman's house wearing a mask, which causes concerns in Ladner that a serial rapist is on the loose. Dora is afraid and stays with Buddy that night, but Buddy sneaks out to visit Alexa when he learns that she may have Barlow's passport. The woman sent by Damien breaks into Buddy's home wearing a mask, but only Dora is there.
10	10	"Exodus"	Clark Mathis	Adam Barr	September 16, 2015	0.91
Buddy learns that Dora shot an intruder in his house with an arrow, but the intruder escaped. The woman is shown stopped in her car with the arrow in her chest, only to be shot and killed by Damien. Dora is hailed as a town hero but does not enjoy the attention. Buddy realizes Damien is probably behind the incident, and pays Ashlee to get a fake passport made for him. Buddy also inadvertently helps Alden's daughter realize her fiancée is not right for her, which inspires Alden to tell Hilva about Ashlee. During Buddy's next sermon, Damien shows up in the back of the church. While Russell creates a distraction, Buddy rushes home to collect his passport and some personal items before fleeing the country. He is met at the door by Lovello and Hyde who, acting on information that Barlow's credit card was recently used, place Buddy under arrest.

=== Season 2 (2016) ===
No. overall	No. in season	Title	Directed by	Written by	Original release date	US viewers (millions)
11	1	"The Devil Went Down to Ladner"	Clark Mathis	Christopher Vane	September 28, 2016	0.320 (TV Land); 0.473 (Nick at Nite)
Lovello and Hyde cuff Buddy and lock him in their car, only to be pursued by Damien. After they narrowly escape, Buddy tries to convince the detectives that he is an undercover FBI agent who witnessed the suicides of both Jonathan Barlow and his true self, so the skeptical detectives give him 24 hours to find Damien, placing a tracking anklet on him. The church staff becomes more suspicious than ever of Buddy's behavior, but he tells them he wants to file a complaint against Alden for slapping him when he really wants to gather evidence on Damien. In the process, he tries to break out of his anklet, which alerts the detectives. Buddy's attempted escape culminates in being caught by Damien and driven to a remote area of the nearby forest, where Damien has already dug Buddy's grave. He tries to distract Damien by throwing dirt in his captor's face but misses, and the episode ends with Damien about to shoot Buddy. Meanwhile, Alden learns the truth about Ashlee but still sees hope for redemption in her.
12	2	"Guardian Angel"	Clark Mathis	Alan R. Cohen & Alan Freedland	October 5, 2016	0.331
Buddy is saved when an unknown assailant shoots Damien in the head. Lovello and Hyde arrive, and Buddy convinces them to bury the body with him rather than face the consequences of interfering with an FBI investigation. While Buddy deals with the aftermath and tries to figure out who the shooter was, Dora begins dating Lovello. At a church staff meeting, Buddy is sent to convince a wealthy elderly woman, who reminds him of a seemingly scary old lady from his childhood, to donate her estate to the church. She convinces Buddy to make love to her in exchange for the donation, but before he does the deed, Buddy tries to scare the hiccups out of her and she dies of a heart attack. He tries to make a handwritten adjustment to the lady's will so he can get a $25,000 personal donation, but the lady's maid trades the forged amendment for another one she made to benefit herself. Meanwhile, Alden makes his feelings known to Ashlee, and she surprisingly decides to quit prostitution and pursue a relationship with him. Elsewhere, a mysterious man starts following Alexa, eventually approaching her and identifying himself as Ray Florez (Reynaldo Gallegos), Kenny Banderas' associate who was just released from prison.
13	3	"Buddy's Prayer"	Fred Goss	Chris Case	October 12, 2016	0.336
Ray Florez threatens Alexa, giving her 24 hours to come up with the stolen $20,000 she owes him. Buddy tries to get Ray to take $5,000, which is all Alexa has, in exchange for "a good word with the Man upstairs". Ray throws Buddy over a bridge and into the water below. Alden announces to the group that he's divorcing Hilva and moving into a small apartment. Thinking Alden is hurting rather than happy, Russell follows him around and tries to comfort him. Just as Dora is considering breaking up with Lovello because they have little in common, she catches him snooping around Buddy's office. Lovello later calls a phone number he found in Buddy's drawer, but Buddy answers it as his FBI agent persona, having anticipated Lovello's snooping. To help Alexa, Buddy goes to the track and bets the $5,000 on a horse named Buddy's Prayer. The horse wins and Buddy cashes in $22,000, but he is accosted in the parking lot and the money is stolen. Buddy is later approached by the thief, a woman named Jasmine (Mekia Cox) who worked with Damien and wants to know what happened to him.
14	4	"Sins of the Past-or Part 1"	Richard Coleman	Christopher Vane	October 19, 2016	0.296
Jasmine begins torturing Buddy for information on Damien's whereabouts, and reveals that Damien was wearing a $50,000 watch. Buddy manages to escape after Jasmine gets a phone call and has to leave. Buddy digs up Damien's body and finds the watch missing, while also noticing that Detective Hyde's shoes are on the corpse. Figuring Hyde stole both the watch and Damien's boots, Buddy plans to see him, but Jasmine shows up and puts a gun to his head. Jasmine says that she will hurt "the redhead" that lives in Buddy's house if he doesn't come up with the watch, while Ray threatens to burn down the church if Alexa doesn't give him the stolen $20,000. Elsewhere, Dora runs into Jeremy, a former high school crush, at a country fair, and he comments on how good she looks. Flashbacks show a nerdy-looking Dora in high school having an obvious crush on Jeremy. She learns that Jeremy would have asked her to prom, but Russell stepped in and asked Dora first. Russell later says that he simply didn't want to go to prom alone, angering Dora.
15	5	"Sins of the Past-or Part 2"	Joe D'Augustine	Gracie Glassmeyer	October 26, 2016	0.368
Buddy visits Hyde, who is wearing Damien's boots, but says he used the watch to pay for a prostitute while in Ladner. His description of the prostitute matches Ashlee, so Buddy sees her. Ashlee says she gave the watch to Alden as a gift, forcing Buddy to dress up like a robber, complete with ski mask, and steal the watch from Alden. Ray has blown up Buddy's car instead of burning the church, and has taken Alexa hostage. Buddy, now having the watch, has to decide if he will save Alexa or Dora. Instead, Buddy gives the watch to Ray to free Alexa, then points Jasmine in the direction of Ray's motel room. Jasmine kills Ray and takes the watch, which saves Dora from her threat. Meanwhile, Jeremy makes a move on Dora, saying he is getting a divorce, but in the heat of their passion, it becomes clear that he is staying with his wife. Dora soon learns that Jeremy was only going to ask her to prom because he lost a bet, forcing him to ask out the geekiest girl in school. Russell's request to take Dora to prom was thus an act of kindness, intended to spare Dora from embarrassment. At the end of the episode, FBI Agent Landecker (Adrian Holmes) is visiting Hyde's precinct, and Hyde lets it slip that he met Landecker's "friend" in Ladner.
16	6	"The Bish Is Back"	Rob Greenberg	Jack Bernstein	November 2, 2016	0.392
Bishop Perkins comes to town with news that he is retiring, and shocks everyone by saying he's considering Buddy to be his successor. Alden is originally against the idea, but changes his tune after making a deal with Perkins to allow him to divorce Hilva without repercussions. Dora tries her hardest to convince the bishop that the Ladner faith community still needs Buddy. Meanwhile, Sheriff Rashida Graham, a local deputy, confronts Buddy over possible connections to the death of Ray Florez, whose body was found in the motel room not long after Buddy's car was blown up. The deputy also has video evidence of Florez visiting Alexa's boutique and talking to her in a threatening manner. Alexa confronts Buddy about his true identity, and reveals she is the one who shot Damien.
17	7	"Ah-Men"	Rob Greenberg	Lauren Caltagirone	November 9, 2016	0.345
Sheriff Graham connects Ray Florez to Kenny Banderas, upon learning they were cellmates in Massachusetts, and has more questions for Buddy and Alexa. Buddy finally levels with Alexa about who Damien was, and the two conspire to get rid of the gun Alexa used to shoot him. After a close call with the police, Buddy and Alexa start making out. Russell tries to get Buddy more involved in the gay community, organizing a protest that almost exposes Buddy's face and false identity to a Portland TV news audience. Meanwhile, an angry Hilva encourages Dora to run against Alden for church president.
18	8	"My Little Brother's Little Brother's Keeper"	Fred Goss	Christopher Vane	November 16, 2016	0.419
Buddy has a chance to come clean with Alexa on both his identity and sexuality, but instead says he is confused and needs a little time. The two sleep together again, anyway. Despite Hilva's encouragement to go negative on Alden, Dora wants to run a clean campaign in the church president election. During pre-election speeches, Alden verbally attacks Dora and she responds by physically attacking him, later losing the election. Sheriff Graham has Buddy take a lie detector test, but the results seem to be backward and it is assumed the machine is broken. Russell asks Buddy to help him with his younger brother's "little brother" Austin (Griffin Gluck) from the Big Brothers program. Buddy gives Austin bad advice, leading the boy to commit vandalism and get sentenced to two years in a juvenile facility. At the end of the episode, Buddy is apprehended by FBI Agent Landecker, with the agent saying, "we know who you are."
19	9	"Judge Not"	Clark Mathis	Alan R. Cohen & Alan Freedland	November 30, 2016	0.383
Agent Landecker, assuming Buddy is "deep undercover", asks for his help in collaring a corrupt judge (John Kapelos), which is the same judge that sentenced Austin to juvenile detention. Sheriff Graham tells Buddy she hooked herself up to the same lie detector that he was on, and it worked fine, so she now knows his baseline questions about who he is and where he is from were lies. As her case crosses with Buddy's when he tries to make a phony deal with the judge, Sheriff Graham is eventually told by Landecker that Buddy is a Federal agent, forcing her to back off. Elsewhere, Dora finds a bra in Buddy's bed and doesn't know what to make of it, while Alden proposes to Ashlee immediately after his divorce from Hilva is final. At the end of the episode, Buddy and Alexa are conversing when a man walks in, claiming to be Alexa's husband.
20	10	"Thy Neighbor's Wife"	Clark Mathis	Story by : Christopher Vane; Teleplay by : Alan R. Cohen & Alan Freedland	December 7, 2016	0.434
Alexa admits to Buddy that she is still married to Kurt, saying he was a violent drunk from whom she ran away. But Kurt says he's been sober for three years and is a changed man. Alexa appears willing to give Kurt another chance, disappointing Buddy. Dora is bird watching in the woods when she discovers Damien's hand sticking out of the ground. She tells Buddy, causing him to drug her and go dig up the body and move it. Ashlee offers Buddy $20,000 to convince Alden to marry her right away, so she can have access to his money. Buddy encourages Alden to "surprise" Ashlee by turning their engagement party into a wedding ceremony. Shortly after, Alexa tells Buddy that Kurt is drinking again, and she wants to run away with Buddy to Mexico. Later, Alden's wedding ceremony is in progress when Buddy gets a text from Alexa, saying she's in an airport hangar and in trouble. Buddy arrives and pulls a gun on Kurt. In the ensuing conversation, Buddy learns that Kurt is still sober, and that Alexa concocted the scene to get Buddy to kill Kurt in a justifiable homicide so she can inherit his money. She then shoots and kills Kurt herself. Seeing the dark side of Alexa, Buddy backs off, leaving Alexa to flee alone in her car. As the episode closes, Buddy hears sirens in the distance.

== Reception ==
Impastor has received a range of generally unfavorable to mixed reviews from critics. On Rotten Tomatoes the series has a rating of 33%, based on 18 reviews, with an average rating of 5.5/10. The site's critical consensus reads, "Impastor wastes a talented cast on a story that feels like one long, badly written joke straining for controversy without delivering a decent punchline." On Metacritic, the series has a score of 49 out of 100, based on 18 critics, indicating "mixed or average reviews".
