= Christopher Vane (screenwriter) =

American television producer and television writer

- Occupations: Television producer, television writer
- Years active: 1979–present

Christopher Vane is an American television producer and television writer. His credits include Thundarr the Barbarian, The Love Boat, Wings, Suddenly Susan, All About the Andersons and The Bill Engvall Show. He was a co-executive producer and writer on Good Luck Charlie from 2010–2014. He was nominated for a Primetime Emmy Award for his work on Good Luck Charlie as a part of the producing team. He is the creator of Impastor comedy series, which aired for two seasons on TV Land.

== Television ==
(series head writer denoted in bold)

- The Plastic Man Comedy/Adventure Show (1979)
- Thundarr the Barbarian (1980)
- The Love Boat (1980-1985)
- Goldie Gold and Action Jack (1981)
- Too Close for Comfort (1982)
- Mork & Mindy/Laverne & Shirley/Fonz Hour (1982)
- Finder of Lost Loves (1984-1985)
- The Torkelsons (1992)
- Man of the People (1992)
- Shaky Ground (1993)
- Blue Skies (1994)
- Dream On (1995-1996)
- Wings (1995-1997)
- Suddenly Susan (1997-1999)
- Veronica’s Closet (1999-2000)
- For Your Love (2000)
- In-Laws (2002-2003)
- All About the Andersons (2003-2004)
- Twins (2005-2006)
- The Bill Engvall Show (2008-2009)
- Good Luck Charlie (2010-2013)
- Brickleberry (2014)
- **Impastor** (2015-2016)
