= Sara Rue =

American actress (born 1979)

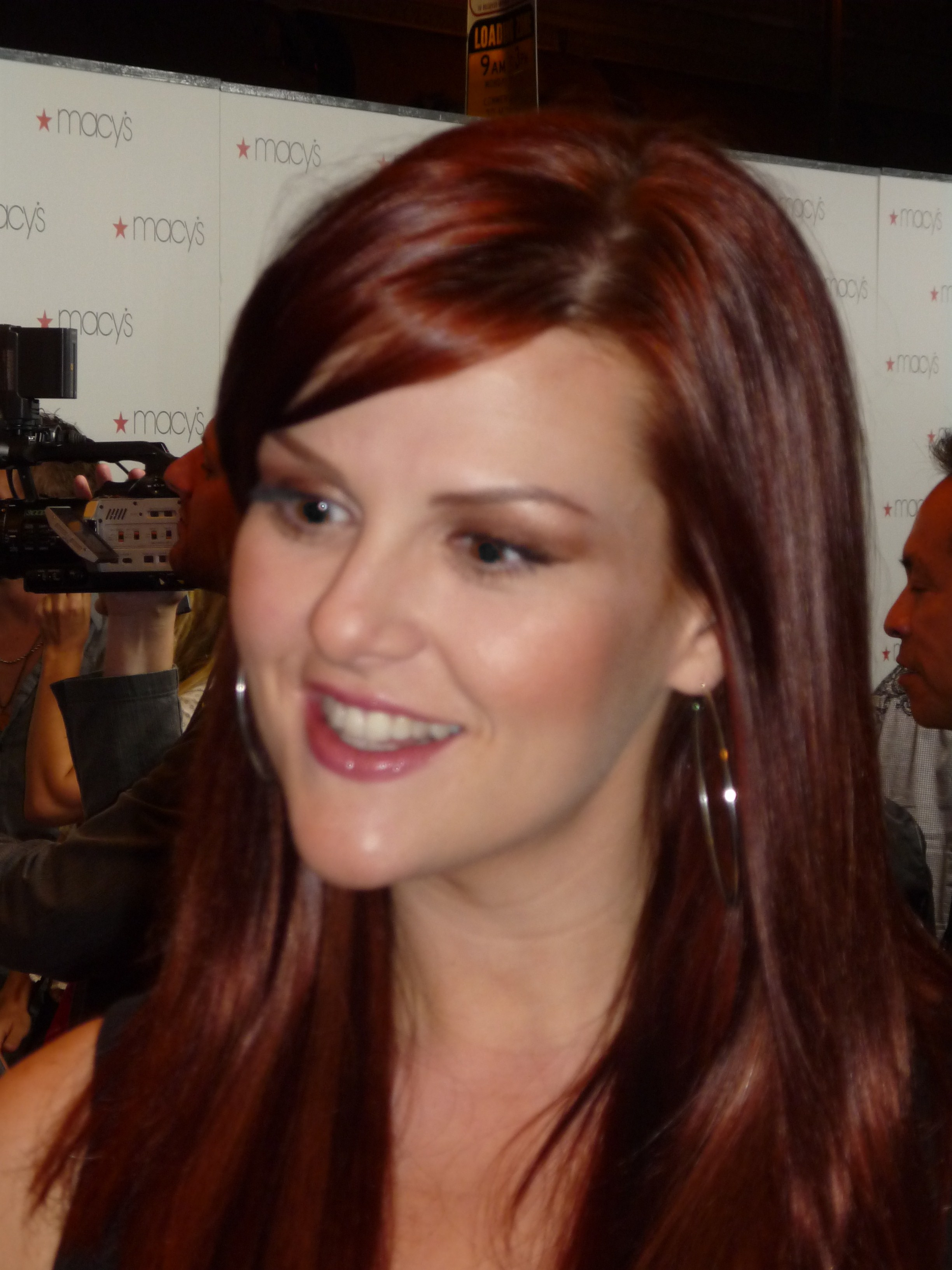
- Rue in September 2010
- Born: Sara Schlackman; January 26, 1979 (age 47); New York City, New York, USA
- Occupation: Actress
- Years active: 1988–present
- Spouses: Mischa Livingstone (m. 2001; div. 2007) Kevin Price (m. 2011)
- Children: 2

Sara Rue (born Sara Schlackman; January 26, 1979) is an American actress. She is best known for her performances as Carmen Ferrara on Popular, as Claude Casey on Less than Perfect, and as the Attorney General in Idiocracy. In 2011, she hosted The CW reality series Shedding for the Wedding. She had a recurring role in the comedy Rules of Engagement, as Brenda, the softball lesbian teammate and good friend of Jeff Bingham. (Note: One of the central characters of Rules of Engagement) She had a regular role as Kim on the short-lived ABC sitcom Malibu Country, and appeared in the main cast of the TV Land comedy series Impastor. She is also known for her role as Olivia Caliban in the second season of the Netflix series A Series of Unfortunate Events.

== Early life ==
The elder of two daughters, Rue was born and raised in New York City, where her parents were active in Broadway theatre. She is Jewish.

== Career ==
Rue began her acting career at the age of nine, appearing in the 1988 film Rocket Gibraltar as Kevin Spacey's daughter. Rue played a very young Roseanne in the first meeting of Roseanne and Dan at a dance on the TV show Roseanne.

She starred in the comedy Grand, before going on to work on Phenom; Minor Adjustments; Zoe, Duncan, Jack & Jane; ER; The Division and Popular. From 2002 to 2006, she starred in the main role of Claude Casey on the ABC sitcom Less than Perfect. She has appeared in several films, including A Map of the World, Can't Hardly Wait, A Slipping Down Life, Idiocracy, Gypsy 83. She also had a small part as a babysitter in Gore Verbinski's adaptation of The Ring. She impressed director Michael Bay so much that a role was written into the movie Pearl Harbor for her.

Rue appeared uncredited in the 2006 Mike Judge film Idiocracy, in the role of the Attorney General. In 2006, Rue starred in the stage musical Little Egypt with French Stewart, Jenny O'Hara and Gregg Henry at the Matrix Theatre in Los Angeles. She guest-starred in Two and a Half Men as Berta's pregnant youngest daughter. She had a stint on the CBS sitcom The Big Bang Theory, playing Dr. Leonard Hofstadter's physician girlfriend Dr. Stephanie Barnett for three episodes. Her first appearance on the show occurred on November 17, 2008. In 2009, Rue appeared in the movies Man Maid and For Christ's Sake. She starred on the short-lived 2009 series Eastwick, based on the novel and movie The Witches of Eastwick. In December 2009, she became a spokesperson for weight loss company Jenny Craig.

In October 2010, Rue joined the cast of Rules of Engagement in a recurring role as Brenda, Jeff and Audrey's surrogate.

It was announced in December 2011 that Rue would be writing and starring in a new show on The CW called Poseurs, about a young woman named Lucy whose life is upended when her fiancé moves out and her fresh-from-rehab collegiate best friend, Alexandra, moves in. The two friends pose as a lesbian couple and actually get married in order to stay in the nice apartment building that only allows married couples.

Rue starred in the ABC show Malibu Country as Reba McEntire's upbeat trophy wife neighbor, Kim Sallinger. Malibu Country ran for one season (2012–13). Rue had the title role of Deb Dorfman in the movie Dorfman in Love (2012).

In 2014, Rue appeared in a recurring role as Candace, fiancee of Christy's ex-husband on the CBS sitcom Mom. In 2015, she was cast as main character Dora in the TV Land comedy Impastor. The show was cancelled after its second season in 2016. Rue had a recurring role as Nancy Granville on ABC's American Housewife which was canceled after five seasons.

In 2017, Rue was cast in the recurring role of Olivia Caliban on the second season of the Netflix comedy drama series A Series of Unfortunate Events. She also has had a recurring role in The Rookie portraying Nell Forester.

== Personal life ==
Rue married filmmaker Mischa Livingstone in 2001. They divorced in 2007.

Rue married teacher Kevin Price on May 21, 2011, in a traditional Jewish wedding. She gave birth to their first child, a daughter named Talulah, in February 2013. She and Price adopted a second daughter, Adelaide, in November 2016.

== Filmography ==
=== Film ===
Year	Title	Role	Notes
1988	Rocket Gibraltar	Jessica Hanson	
1992	Passed Away	Megan Scanlan	
1998	Can't Hardly Wait	Earth Girl	
1998	Nowhere to Go		a.k.a. Silent Hearts (USA: TV title)
1999	A Slipping-Down Life	Violet	
1999	A Map of the World	Debbie	
2001	Pearl Harbor	Nurse Martha	
2001	Gypsy 83	Gypsy Vale	
2002	The Ring	Babysitter	
2005	Barbara Jean	Barbara Jean	Short film
2006	Danny Roane: First Time Director	Charlotte Lewis	
2006	Idiocracy	Attorney General "Fun Bags" (Uncredited)	
2008	Man Maid	Torry	
2009	Not Since You	Sarah 'Doogs' Doogins	
2010	For Christ's Sake	Candy	
2011	Dorfman in Love	Deb Dorfman	
2013	Miss Dial	Sam	
2020	American Pie Presents: Girls' Rules	Ellen	Direct-to-video

=== Television ===
Year	Title	Role	Notes
1990	Grand	Edda Pasetti	Main role (26 episodes)
1992	Roseanne	Teenage Roseanne	Episode: "Halloween IV"
1993–94	Phenom	Monica	Recurring role (14 episodes)
1995	Blossom	Angie	Episode: "Mating Rituals"
1995	Family Reunion: A Relative Nightmare	Jacquelyn	Television movie
1995–96	Minor Adjustments	Darby Gladstone	Main role (20 episodes)
1996	ER	Jane	Episode: "Don't Ask, Don't Tell"
1996	Pearl	Bertha Sugs	Episode: "Ticket to Ride "
1996	For My Daughter's Honor	Kimberly Jones	Television movie; a.k.a. Indecent Seduction
1997	Ned & Stacey	Amy	Episode: "Prom Night"
1997	Happily Ever After: Fairy Tales for Every Child	Younger Sister (voice)	Episode: "The Golden Goose"
1998	Chicago Hope	Rhonda Fritz	Episode: "The Ties That Bind"
1998	The Simple Life	Melanie	Episodes: "Pilot", "Sara's Ex", and "The Luke & Sara Show"
1999	Zoe, Duncan, Jack & Jane	Breeny Kennedy	Episodes: "Everything You Wanted to Know About Zoe", "To Jack, from Zoe", and "Sympathy for Jack"
1999–2001	Popular	Carmen Ferrara	Main role (43 episodes)
2000, 2018	Will & Grace	Joyce Adler	Episodes: "Lows in the Mid-Eighties" (season 3), "One Job" (season 9)
2002–03	The Division	Amanda McCafferty	Episodes: "Hide and Seek", "Remembrance", and "Acts of Betrayal"
2003	MADtv	The Babysitter	Episode #9.11
2002–06	Less than Perfect	Claudia "Claude" Casey	Lead role (81 episodes)
2003	This Time Around	Gabby Castellani	Television movie
2006	Play Nice		Television movie
2006	Brandy & Mr. Whiskers	Sandy Carington (voice)	Episode: "Sandy & Mr. Frisky"
2006–07	Two and a Half Men	Naomi	Episodes: "Repeated Blows to His Unformed Head" and "Castrating Sheep in Montana"
2007	Nurses	Chris Korenek	Television movie
2008	The Big Bang Theory	Dr. Stephanie Barnett	Episodes: "The Lizard-Spock Expansion", "The White Asparagus Triangulation" and "The Vartabedian Conundrum"
2008	Nightmare at the End of the Hall	Courtney	Television movie
2008	Spaced	Apryl	Television movie
2009	Leverage	Marissa Devins	Episode: "The Mile High Job"
2009–10	Eastwick	Penny Higgins	Main role
2010	Private Practice	Shira Cole	Episode: "Til Death Do Us Part"
2010–13	Rules of Engagement	Brenda the softball lesbian	Recurring role (12 episodes)
2011	My Future Boyfriend	Elizabeth Barrett	Television movie
2011	Shedding for the Wedding	Herself – Host	Regular (5 episodes)
2011	RuPaul's Drag Race 3	Herself – Guest Judge	Episodes: "Face, Face, Face of Cakes" and "RuPaul Rewind"
2012	Psych	Amy Alleris	Episode: "Heeeeere's Lassie"
2012–13	Malibu Country	Kim Sallinger	Main role
2014–16	Mom	Candace Hayes	Recurring role (7 episodes)
2014–17	Celebrity Name Game	Herself / Celebrity player	15 episodes
2015–16	Impastor	Dora Winston	Main role
2015	Don't Wake Mommy	Beth	Television movie
2016–17	Bones	Karen Delfs	Recurring role (7 episodes)
2017	All For Love	Jo Payden	Television Film (Hallmark Channel)
2017–2020	American Housewife	Nancy Granville	Recurring role
2018	A Series of Unfortunate Events	Olivia Caliban	Recurring role (7 episodes)
2018–2019, 2022, 2024	The Rookie	Nell Forester	6 episodes
2019	True Love Blooms	Vikki	Television Film (Hallmark Channel)
2020–2021	B Positive	Julia Dunbar	Main role
2020–2022	25 Words or Less	Herself / Contestant	15 episodes
2024	That Girl Lay Lay	Ms. Hooper	Episode: "School of Rap"

== Awards and nominations ==
Year	Ceremony	Award	Work	Result
2004	Indianapolis International Film Festival	Special Jury Prize: Performance (Shared with Lili Taylor)	A Slipping-Down Life	Won
2009	Ashland Independent Film Festival	Best Acting Ensemble: Feature (Shared with Phillip Vaden, Jane Lynch, Steve Hytner and John Doe)	Man Maid	Won
2013	LA Femme International Film Festival	Comedic Actress Award		Won
