= Porn 'n Chicken =

Student club at Yale University

Porn 'n' Chicken was a student club based at Yale University whose members met to watch pornography and eat fried chicken. The group briefly gained notoriety in 2001 when they announced plans to shoot their own adult film titled The StaXXX on campus with other students, but the film was never completed or released.

A fictionalized version of the club's experiences was produced as an American TV movie titled Porn 'n Chicken and aired on Comedy Central in 2002.

== Student club ==
In October 2000 an article in The Yale Herald announced the first known public discussion of the club, mentioning the project of its own adult film. The film's name had already been selected -- The StaXXX. Filming commenced in January 2001, and publications including The New Yorker, Fox News Boston, Hustler, The New York Post, Brill's Content, The Village Voice, Premiere, Evening Standard inquired for information on the production. Only a trailer was ever completed, and shown before a screening at the Yale Film Society.

== Film adaptation ==
Porn 'n Chicken
- Written by: Lawrence Trilling; A.D. Miles
- Directed by: Teresa Arcos
- Starring: Ebon Moss-Bachrach; Angela Goethals; Alex Burns; Geoffrey Arend; Michael Goldstrom; Ginnifer Goodwin; Kurt Fuller
- Country of origin: United States
- Original language: English

Production
- Producer: Natascha Tillmanns
- Running time: 100 minutes

Original release
- Network: Comedy Central
- Release: 2002

James Ponsoldt and fellow Yale alumni sold the Porn 'n Chicken stories to Comedy Central, who filmed on the Columbia University campus. Directed by Lawrence Trilling, Porn 'n Chicken featured fictionalized versions of group activities and premiered on Comedy Central on October 13, 2002.

=== Reception ===
It received mixed critical reception, with the New York Daily News called it "more boring than offensive," but Variety commenting, "Sweeter and more relevant than its fratboy title suggests, Comedy Central’s Porn ‘n Chicken is a likable fusion of, of all things, Animal House, Dead Poets Society and Deep Throat." while the Daily Free Press stated, "Beyond the necessity of well spent free time, as expected, the message of Porn ‘n Chicken is largely empty. However, the two-hour escape succeeds admirably as a mental nap and an amusing tale of sticky-fingered American college students with little to revolt against besides the dullness of their existence."
