= Mary Bowser =

Freed slave and American Civil War spy, born 1846

Mary Richards, also known as Mary Jane Richards Garvin and possibly Mary Bowser (born 1846), was a Union spy during the Civil War. She was possibly born into slavery in Virginia, but there is no documentation of where she was born or who her parents were. By the age of seven, she was enslaved by the household of Elizabeth "Bet" Van Lew, in Richmond, Virginia. The Van Lew family sent Richards to school somewhere in the north, possibly to be schooled by the Quaker community, and then to Liberia through the American Colonization Society. Richards returned to Richmond shortly before the outbreak of the American Civil War, where she was one of many black and white Richmond residents who collected and delivered military information to the United States Army under the leadership of Elizabeth Van Lew.

Richards is often referred to as Mary Bowser. She was likely married to a Wilson Bowser at the start of the Civil War. A 1911 article about her in Harper's Monthly, which was based in part on the faulty memory of Bet Van Lew's niece, popularized Richards' story, and was the source of much of the ensuing lore around Richards, including a 1987 TV movie, A Special Friendship. The Harper's article included details that are not known to be accurate, such as that Richards had worked undercover directly in the Confederate White House, that she had a photographic memory, and that she tried to set fire to the Confederate White House at the end of the war; and other details that are clearly false, such as that her name was "Mary Elizabeth Bowser".

== Early years ==
Mary Jane Richards was likely born in Virginia, and was possibly enslaved from birth by Eliza Baker Van Lew and John Van Lew (parents of Elizabeth) or their extended family. The first record directly related to her is her baptism, as "Mary Jane" at St. John's Church in Richmond, on May 17, 1846. Mary Jane's baptism at the Van Lew family church, rather than at Richmond's First African Baptist Church where the other Van Lew slaves were baptized, indicates that someone in the Van Lew family took special notice of Richards, as evidenced also by subsequent arrangements for her education. Not long after this baptism, Elizabeth Van Lew sent Richards north to school.

In 1855, Richards went to Liberia in West Africa, to join a missionary community, as arranged by Elizabeth Van Lew. By the spring of 1860, Richards had returned to Richmond.

== American Civil War ==
When I open my eyes in the morning, I say to the servant, "What news, Mary?" and my caterer never fails! Most generally our reliable news is gathered from negroes, and they certainly show wisdom, discretion and prudence, which is wonderful.

— Elizabeth Van Lew, diary entry dated May 14, 1864

On April 16, 1861, Mary wed Wilson Bowser. The ceremony took place in St. John's Church, just four days after Confederate troops opened fire on Fort Sumter, the first battle of the Civil War. The marriage was relatively short lived, and by the time the war ended, she was once again using the surname Richards.

Throughout the war, Mary participated in the pro-Union underground espionage ring organized by Elizabeth Van Lew. She engaged in a variety of pro-Union activities. On at least one occasion she went, as she later put it, "into President Davis's house while he was absent," pretending to be getting laundry, in order to look for documents related to the war effort. Although the exact details of the intelligence she collected are unknown, the value of this espionage ring was noted by Generals Benjamin Butler, Ulysses S. Grant, and George H. Sharpe.

== Postwar life ==
A few days after the fall of Richmond, Mary Jane Richards worked as teacher to former slaves in the city.

Richards gave at least two lectures in the North in 1865 about her education, travel to Liberia, and wartime experiences. In September, a reporter claimed that she and the famed white political orator Anna Dickinson "might, indeed, easily be mistaken for twin sisters," likely referring to the strangeness of a woman speaking about political issues to a group. While speaking in New York, Richards protected her identity by using pseudonyms at both lectures, calling herself Richmonia Richards at Abyssinian Baptist Church in Manhattan on September 11 and Richmonia R. St. Pierre a week or two later at the African Methodist Episcopal Church on Bridge Street in Brooklyn.

Again using the name Mary J. Richards, she founded a freedmen's school in St. Marys, Georgia in early 1867. Her school served day students, adult night students, and Sunday school students, all taught by herself.

In a June 1867 letter to the superintendent of education for the Georgia Freedmen's Bureau, she requested that he refer to her as Mary J. R. Garvin. A later letter may imply that she intended to join her new husband in the West Indies after St. Mary's school closed.

== Untrue or unsubstantiated claims ==
In addition to the misuse of the name "Bowser," a number of claims made in purportedly nonfiction accounts about this woman are unsubstantiated, or even untrue. Many are embellishments of a June 1911 Harper's Monthly article, the first known publication of the erroneous Bowser's name. A number of modern media sources, including NOW with Bill Moyers, NPR and The Washington Post, have republished these false or disputed claims.

- No evidence exists that Van Lew or Richards identified as Quaker, or that either one attended a Quaker school, as is sometimes claimed. It is not known where Richards attended school.
- It is not known whether Richards infiltrated the Confederate White House as a permanent servant, although she did on at least one occasion enter the house to look for documents.
- A "colored girl Mary" who participated in the espionage ring is claimed to have a photographic memory in a document called, "Recollections of Thomas McNiven and his activities in Richmond during the American Civil War." The document's accuracy is doubted by historians including Elizabeth R. Varon, author of Southern Lady, Yankee Spy, a biography of Van Lew.
- Although she used numerous pseudonyms, the name "Ellen Bond" was not one of them.
- Richards did not likely attempt to set fire to the Confederate White House and flee Richmond in early 1865, as she was still in Richmond in April 1865 educating newly freed slaves.
- She was not smuggled out of the city to Philadelphia in a cartload of manure during the war.
- A member of the Bowser family told an NPR reporter that in the 1950s she had inadvertently discarded a book that might have contained Mary's wartime journal. But the existence of such a journal cannot be confirmed. It is unlikely that a spy would keep such a dangerous document.
- A photograph of another woman by the name of Mary Bowser has been incorrectly associated with the spy Mary Richards.

== In popular culture ==
A novel by Lois Leveen, The Secrets of Mary Bowser, is based on Richards' life.

The 2013 play Lady Patriot by Ted Lange is about Bowser and her acts of espionage. The play was produced by Mary Lange and premiered at the Hudson Backstage Theatre in Santa Monica, California. Mary Bowser was played by Chrystee Pharris.

A 1987 made-for-TV movie, A Special Friendship, was loosely based on Bowser and Van Lew's activities. Bowser was played by Akosua Busia.

The heroine of the 2017 novel An Extraordinary Union by Alyssa Cole is based in part on Mary Bowser.

The Civil War podcast Uncivil had a 2018 episode about Mary Bowser. This episode has been criticized for presenting much of the disputed information about Richards – including the name "Mary Bowser" – as fact.

The Comedy Central mini series "Badass Bitches of History," featured Mary Bowser, played by actress Tanisha Long, in Season 1 Episode 2: Union Spy Mary Elizabeth Bowser, 2018. The two minute episode wholly presented the disputed claims as fact.

The opera Intelligence by composer Jake Heggie and librettist Gene Scheer is based on Mary Bowser's life. Commissioned by Houston Grand Opera, the new opera premiered at the Wortham Theater on September 20, 2023 with a production directed by Jawole Willa Jo Zollar. The opera repeats a number of false claims, for example, "Bowser" setting fire to the Confederate White House, perhaps further confusing audiences about the real history.

== Recognition ==
"Mary Elizabeth Bowser" [sic] has been honored by the U.S. government with an induction into the Military Intelligence Hall of Fame in Fort Huachuca, Arizona, for her work in the war. In 2026, the Amazon Prime series "The Gray House" mixed fact with fiction to fill to provide details of the Union spying network that was headed by Elizabeth van Lew and that included her (inherited) slave Mary Jane Richards and fed to Union generals military plans of the Confederate President Jefferson Davis, who lived in that Presidential mansion, "The Gray House."

== See also ==
- Harriet Tubman
- Ellen Barnes McGinnis, an enslaved woman who worked in the Confederate White House
