= Daisy Head =

British actress (born 1991)

- Born: 17 March 1991 (age 35); Fulham, London, England
- Occupation: Actress
- Years active: 2002–present
- Father: Anthony Head
- Relatives: Emily Head (sister); Helen Shingler (grandmother); Murray Head (uncle)

Daisy Head (born 17 March 1991) is an English actress. On television, she is known for her roles in the BBC One drama The Syndicate (2015), the Freeform series, Guilt (2016), the Hulu series Harlots (2019), the Netflix series, Shadow and Bone (2021–2023) and the Amazon Prime series, The Gray House (2026). Her films include Dungeons & Dragons: Honor Among Thieves (2023).

== Early life ==
Head was born in Fulham, London. She is the daughter of actor Anthony Head and younger sister of actress Emily Head. Daisy attended Kingswood School in Bath and trained at the Dorothy Coleborn School of Dance.

== Career ==
Head's first role was appearing alongside her father in the TV series Rose and Maloney. She has subsequently appeared in a number of TV programmes, including Trial and Retribution, Doc Martin, and Holby City.

In 2010, she made her film debut in playing Chloe Chambers in The Last Seven, alongside Danny Dyer, and later that year she played Daisy in CBBC's musical film Rules of Love, alongside future Rixton frontman Jake Roche.

In 2016, she starred as Arriane Alter in the British/Australian/American romantic fantasy film Fallen as well as in the new Underworld film Underworld: Blood Wars as Alexia.

In November 2015, it was announced that Head would take the lead role of Grace in Freeform's drama series Guilt about an American student in London whose roommate is murdered. The series concluded after 10 episodes.

In 2017, Head starred in the Shakespearean Pilot A Midsummer's Nightmare alongside Casey Deidrick.

In 2018, Head had a supporting role in Kay Mellor's ITV drama Girlfriends which started airing in January 2018. In May 2017, it was announced that she would be starring alongside Daisy Ridley in the 2018 film Ophelia.

Head joined the cast of Harlots as Kate Bottomley in the Hulu series' third season in 2019. In October 2019, it was announced Head would play Genya Safin in the 2021 Netflix series Shadow and Bone, an adaptation of fantasy book series Shadow and Bone and Six of Crows by Leigh Bardugo.

In 2024, Head had a lead role in the period drama The Gray House.

== Filmography ==
=== Film ===
Year	Title	Role	Notes
2010	The Last Seven	Chloe Chambers	
2014	Heart of Lightness	Bolette	
2016	Fallen	Arriane Alter	
2016	Underworld: Blood Wars	Alexia	
2018	Ophelia	Christiana	
2019	The Ninth	Olivia Reed	
2019	Exit Eve	Claire	Short film
2021	Wrong Turn	Edith	
2023	Dungeons & Dragons: Honor Among Thieves	Sofina the Red Wizard	

=== Television ===
Year	Title	Role	Notes
2004	Feather Boy	Kate Barber	Main role, 6 episodes
2005	Rose and Maloney	Daniella Terry	Episode: "Annie Johnson"
2005	Trial & Retribution	Naomi Franke	Episode: "The Lovers: Part 1"
2005	Patrick's Planet	Christina	Main role, 13 episodes
2007	Doc Martin	Mandie Jordan	Episode: "Movement"
2010	Holby City	Miri Gellert	Episodes: "All Cried Out", "Two in Five Marriages..."
2010	Rules of Love	Daisy	Television film
2011	Doctors	Victoria Liston	Episode: "Quarantine"
2012	Endeavour	Jenny Crisp	Episode: Pilot
2012	The Proxy	Sarah	Recurring role, 8 episodes
2013	When Calls the Heart	Julie Thatcher	Television film; as Daisey Head
2015	Suspects	Emily Perkins	Episode: "Connections"
2015	The Syndicate	Amy Stevenson	Main role (series 3)
2016	Guilt	Grace Atwood	Main role, 10 episodes
2017	A Midsummer's Nightmare	Elena	Television pilot (aired on Lifetime)
2018	Girlfriends	Ruby	Main role, 6 episodes
2019	Harlots	Kate Bottomley/Quigley	Main role (season 3)
2021–2023	Shadow and Bone	Genya Safin	Recurring role, 12 episodes
2022	The Sandman	Judy Talbot	Episode: "24/7"
2023	Still Up	Chloe	Episode: "The Wedding"
2024	The Gray House	Elizabeth Van Lew	Lead role, 8 episodes
TBA	One Piece †	Miss Doublefinger	Filming (season 3)
