= John Henry Faulk =

American storyteller and radio show host (1913–1990)

- Born: August 21, 1913; Austin, Texas, US
- Died: April 9, 1990 (aged 76); Austin, Texas, US
- Resting place: Oakwood Cemetery in Austin
- Education: University of Texas at Austin
- Occupations: Humorist; folklorist; actor; TV & radio personality
- Known for: Having Austin central library named in his honor
- Spouses: Harriet Elizabeth Wood ('Hally Wood") (m. 1940 div. 1947); Lynne Smith (Gordon); Elizabeth Peake
- Children: 5

John Henry Faulk (August 21, 1913 – April 9, 1990) was an American storyteller, humorist, and radio show host. His successful lawsuit against the entertainment industry helped bring an end to the Hollywood blacklist.

== Early life ==
John Henry Faulk was born in Austin, Texas, to Methodist parents Henry Faulk and his wife Martha Miner Faulk. John Henry had four siblings.

Faulk spent his childhood years in Austin in the noted Victorian house Green Pastures. A journalist acquaintance from Austin has written that the two of them came from "extremely similar family backgrounds – the old Southern wealth with rich heritage and families dedicated to civil rights long before it was hip to fight racism."

== Education and military service ==
Faulk enrolled at the University of Texas in Austin in 1932. He became a protégé of J. Frank Dobie, Walter Prescott Webb, Roy Bedichek, and Mody C. Boatright, enabling Faulk to hone his skills as a folklorist. He earned a master's degree in folklore with his thesis "Ten Negro Sermons". He further began to craft his oratory style as a part-time English teacher at the university 1940–1942, relating Texas folk tales peppered with his gift of character impersonations.

He was initially unfit for service with the United States Army because of an eye problem. Instead, Faulk joined the Merchant Marine in 1942 for a one-year stint, spending 1943 in Cairo, Egypt, serving the American Red Cross. World War II had caused the United States Army to relax its enlistment standards, and Faulk finally enlisted in 1944. He served as a medic at Camp Swift, Texas. During this period, Faulk also joined the American Civil Liberties Union.

== Career ==
While a soldier at Camp Swift, Faulk began writing his own radio scripts. An acquaintance facilitated an interview for him at WCBS in New York City. The network executives were sufficiently impressed to offer him his own radio show. Upon his 1946 discharge from the Army, Faulk began his Johnny's Front Porch radio show for WCBS. The show featured Faulk's characterizations that he had been developing since his university years. Faulk eventually went to another radio station, but returned to WCBS for a four-hour morning talk show. The John Henry Faulk Show ran for six years. His radio successes provided opportunity for him to appear as himself on television, in shows including the 1951 Mark Goodson and William Todman game show It's News to Me, hosted by John Charles Daly. He also appeared on Leave It to the Girls in 1953 and The Name's the Same in 1955.

Cactus Pryor met Faulk in the studios of KLBJ (then KTBC) where Faulk stopped by to thank Pryor for letting his mother hear his New York show. Pryor had been "accidentally" broadcasting Faulk's radio show in Texas where Faulk was not otherwise heard. Although the broadcast happened repeatedly, Pryor always claimed he just hit the wrong button in the studio. Pryor visited Faulk at a Manhattan apartment he shared with Alan Lomax and became introduced to the movers and shakers of the East Coast celebrity scene of that era. When Pryor stood by Faulk during the blacklisting and tried to find him work, Pryor's children were harassed, a prominent Austin physician circulated a letter questioning Pryor's patriotism, and an Austin attorney tried to convince Lyndon B. Johnson to discharge Pryor from the airwaves. The Pryor family and the Faulk family remained close and supportive of each other for the rest of Faulk's life.

In December 1955, Faulk was elected second vice president of the American Federation of Television and Radio Artists (AFTRA). Orson Bean was the first vice president and Charles Collingwood was the president of the union. Collingwood, Bean, and Faulk were part of a middle-of-the-road slate of non-communist, anti-AWARE organization candidates that Faulk had helped draft. Twenty-seven of thirty-five vacant seats on the board went to the middle-of-the-road slate. Faulk's public position during the campaign had been that the union should be focused on jobs and security, not blacklisting of members.

In 1969 he was a part of the newly formed Committee to Investigate Assassinations. In the 1970s in Austin, he was also befriended by the young co-editor of the Texas Observer, Molly Ivins, and became an early supporter of hers.

== Blacklist controversy ==
Faulk's radio career at CBS ended in 1957, a victim of the Cold War and the blacklisting of the 1950s. AWARE, Inc., a for-profit corporation inspired by Wisconsin Senator Joseph McCarthy, offered a "clearance" service to major media advertisers and radio and television networks; for a fee, AWARE would investigate the backgrounds of entertainers for signs of Communist sympathy or affiliation.

In 1955, Faulk earned the ill will of the blacklisting organization when other members and he wrested control of their union, the AFTRA, from officers backed by AWARE. In reprisal, AWARE labeled Faulk a communist. When he discovered that AWARE was actively keeping radio stations from offering him employment, Faulk sought compensation.

Several prominent radio personalities along with CBS News vice president Edward R. Murrow supported Faulk's attempt to put an end to blacklisting. With financial backing from Murrow, Faulk engaged New York attorney Louis Nizer. Attorneys for AWARE, including McCarthy-committee counsel Roy Cohn, managed to stall the suit, originally filed in 1957, for five years. When the trial finally concluded in a New York courtroom, the jury had determined that Faulk should receive more compensation than he sought in his original petition. On June 28, 1962, the jury awarded him the largest libel judgment in history to that date — $3.5 million. An appeals court lowered the amount to $500,000. Legal fees and accumulated debts erased most of the balance of the award. He netted some $75,000.

Faulk's book, Fear on Trial, published in 1963, tells the story of the experience. The book was remade into an Emmy Award-winning TV movie in 1975 by CBS Television with William Devane portraying Faulk and George C. Scott playing Faulk's lawyer, Louis Nizer.

Other supporters in the blacklist struggle included radio pioneer and Wimberley, Texas, native Parks Johnson, and reporter and CBS television news anchor Walter Cronkite.

== Personal life and death ==
In 1940, John Henry Faulk and Harriet Elizabeth ("Hally") Wood, a music student at the University of Texas Fine Arts School, were married, six weeks after they met. The marriage ended in divorce in 1947; the couple had one daughter, Cynthia Tannehill. In 1948, Faulk and New Yorker Lynne Smith were married, also some six weeks after they met. That marriage also ended in divorce because of fallout from the blacklisting upheaval. Faulk and Smith had two daughters, Johanna and Evelyn, and one son, Frank Dobie Faulk. In 1965, Faulk and Elizabeth Peake were married; they had one son, John Henry Faulk III.

John Henry Faulk died in Austin of cancer on April 9, 1990. He was interred there at the Oakwood Cemetery. Austin restaurateur and author Mary Faulk Koock (1910–1996) was Faulk's sister.

== Awards and tributes ==
- (1980) "The Ballad of John Henry Faulk", by artist Phil Ochs, is on his album The Broadside Tapes 1, Folkways Records.
- (1983) Faulk was the recipient of a Paul Robeson Award, which recognizes exemplification of principles by which Paul Robeson lived his life.
- (1995) John Henry Faulk Public Library, the main branch of the Austin Public Library, originally named Central Library when constructed in 1979, was renamed to honor Faulk.
- The John Henry Faulk Award, Tejas Storytelling Association, is presented annually in Denton, Texas, to the individual who has made a significant contribution to the art of storytelling in the Southwest.

== Film and television credits ==
=== Film ===
- All the Way Home (1963) – Walter Starr
- The Best Man (1964) – Governor T.T. Claypoole
- Lovin' Molly (1974) – Mr. Grinsom
- The Texas Chain Saw Massacre (1974) – Storyteller
- Leadbelly (1976) – Governor Neff
- Trespasses (1986) – Doctor Silver (final film role)

=== Television ===
- It's News to Me (1951–1954) – Self
- Leave It to the Girls (Oct 3, 1953) – Self
- The Name's the Same (Feb 21, 1955) – Self
- For the People (1965) – Reynolds
- Fear on Trial (1975) – Writer, biographical film of John Henry Faulk
- Hee Haw (1975–1982) – Self
- Adam (1983) – Strom Thurmond
- Cronkite Remembers (1997) – Uncredited archive footage

== Discography ==
- John Henry Faulk, recordings of Negro religious services. Part 1 [sound recording] (July 1941) 47 sound discs : analog, 33 1/3 and 78 rpm; 12 in.
- John Henry Faulk recordings of Negro religious services. Part 2 [sound recording] (Aug–Sept 1941) 42 sound discs : analog, 33 1/3 rpm; 12 in.
- John Henry Faulk Texas recordings collection [sound recording] (Oct–Nov 1941) 33 sound discs : analog, 33 1/3 rpm; 12 in.
- John Henry Faulk collection of Texas prison songs [sound recording] (1942) 10 sound discs : analog, 78 rpm; 12 in. + documentation.
- John Henry Faulk and others, "Man-on-the-Street" interviews collection [sound recording] (1941) 6 sound discs : analog; 16 in.; 15 sound discs : analog; 12 in.
- American people speak on the war [sound recording] (1941) 1 sound disc (ca. 15 min.) : analog, 33 1/3 rpm; 16 in.
- The people speak to the president, or, Dear, Mr. President [sound recording] (1942) 1 sound disc : analog, 33 1/3 rpm; 16 in.
- CBS news with Stuart Metz.[sound recording]. (May 13, 1957) 1 sound tape reel (5 min.) : analog, 7 1/2 ips, full track, mono.; 7 in
- John Henry Faulk show (May 13, 1957) 1 sound tape reel (25 min.) : analog, 7 1/2 ips, full track, mono.; 7 in
- Blacklist: a failure in political imagination [Sound recording] (1960) reel. 7 in. 3 3/4 ips. 1/2 track. cassette. 2 1/2 × 4 in
- Help unsell the war. American report [sound recording] (1972) 1 sound disc : analog, 33 1/3 rpm; 12 in
- Selected radio programs from The Larry King show [sound recording] (1982–1985) 116 sound cassettes : analog
- To Secure the Blessings of Liberty [audio cassette] (1986). ISBN 978-0292780958 Recording of Faulk discussing U.S. history, the Constitution, and Bill of Rights.
- African-American Slave Audio Recordings (2008)

== Radio appearances and speeches ==
- Faulk recorded his "Christmas Story" in 1974 for the NPR program Voices in the Wind.
- Faulk made speeches on the First Amendment and civil rights for many colleges and universities.

== Bibliography ==
- Faulk, John Henry (1940). Quickened by De Spurit: Ten Negro Sermons (Masters thesis). University of Texas at Austin. OCLC 1256593762.
- —— (1964). Fear on Trial. Simon and Schuster. LCCN 64-22407.
- —— (1983). Fear on Trial (Revised edition). Gardner, Don (ed). University of Texas Press. ISBN 978-0292724433. Foreword by Studs Terkel.
- —— (1985). The Uncensored John Henry Faulk. Texas Monthly Press. ISBN 978-0877190134.

== Plays ==
- Deep in the Heart (one-man play)
- Pear Orchard, Texas (one-man play)

== Additional sourcing ==
- Biffle, Kent (1993). A Month of Sundays. University of North Texas Press. ISBN 978-0-929398-56-3.
- Foerstel, Herbert N (1997). Free Expression and Censorship in America: An Encyclopedia. Greenwood. ISBN 978-0-313-29231-6.
- Lief, Michael S.; Caldwell, Harry M. (2004). And the Walls Came Tumbling Down: Greatest Closing Arguments Protecting Civil Liberties. Scribner. ISBN 978-0-7432-4666-8.
- Smith, F. Leslie; Wright II, John W.; Ostroff, David H. (1998). Perspectives on Radio and Television: Telecommunication in the United States. Routledge. ISBN 978-0-8058-2092-8.
- Sterling, Christopher H (2003). Encyclopedia of Radio. Routledge. ISBN 978-1-57958-249-4.
- Timberg, Bernard; Erler, Bob (2002). Television Talk: A History of the TV Talk Show. University of Texas Press. ISBN 978-0-292-78176-4.
