= Lois Leveen =

American author

- Education: Harvard University (A.B., 1990); University of Southern California (M.A., 1994); University of California, Los Angeles (M.A., 1996); University of California, Los Angeles (Ph.D., 1999)
- Writing career
- Genre: Historical fiction
- Notable work: The Secrets of Mary Bowser (2012)

Lois M. Leveen is an American writer, educator and historian based in Portland, Oregon.

== Early life and education ==
Leveen graduated from Harvard College (AB in history and literature), University of Southern California (MA in English), and University of California, Los Angeles (MA and PhD in English).

== Writing ==
Leveen published her first novel, The Secrets of Mary Bowser, in 2012. The novel is based on the life of Mary Bowser, a Virginia slave who became a spy for the Union Army. It was named one of The Oregonian's Top Ten Northwest Books of 2012, and has been optioned for film.

For her second novel, Juliet's Nurse, Leveen reimagined the story of Shakespeare's Romeo and Juliet from the point of view of the nurse. The audiobook, which was read by Nicola Barber, won an Earphones Award from AudioFile Magazine.

One of Leveen's essays is mentioned in CrossRoutes: The Meanings of "Race" for the 21st Century, a 2003 book.

== Bibliography ==
- The Secrets of Mary Bowser (2012) ISBN 9781444736250
- Juliet's Nurse (2014) ISBN 9780345814005
