= Pravesh Kumar =

British director and writer (born 1970)

Pravesh Kumar MBE (born 9 September 1970) is a director and writer working in theatre and film and is the Artistic Director and Chief Executive of Rifco Theatre Company.

== Early life ==
Kumar grew up in Slough, Berkshire, in the United Kingdom, and attended Langley College, where he was the only student of colour on the performing arts course that year. Kumar then went on to train as an actor at the Academy of Live and Recorded Arts.

He is the brother of Andy Kumar.

Kumar worked in the Hindi cinema industry for a decade.

== Career ==
In 1999 Kumar, along with Ajay Chhabra, Gurpreet Kaur Bhatti and Harvey Virdi, created and staged a comedy sketch show called Airport 2000 – Asians in Transit, which was partly inspired by Kumar's time working as a British Airways check-in agent. It was the success of this production that made Kumar realise that there was a real hunger amongst British South Asian audiences for authentic stories. He describes the creation of this show as the "accidental birth of Rifco".

Rifco Theatre Company (known then as Rifco Arts) mounted another show the following year, Bollywood 2000 – Yet Another Love Story, a sketch show riffing on Bollywood's formulaic clichés. This was Kumar's theatrical directorial debut. Kumar would go on to write and direct a plethora of plays and musicals as the Artistic Director of Rifco Theatre Company, including The Deranged Marriage, There's Something About Simmy, Britain's Got Bhangra and Frankie Goes to Bollywood.

In 2011 the Rifco musical Britain's Got Bhangra, written and directed by Kumar, won the People's Favourite Musical award at The Offies.

In June 2022, Little English premiered at the London Indian Film Festival – a film written and directed by Kumar, based on his play There's Something About Simmy. The film would go on to have a limited nationwide release from 17 March 2023.

In July 2022, Kumar was awarded an MBE for his contribution to British Theatre.

In 2024, Frankie Goes to Bollywood, a musical that Kumar had been working on for several years alongside composer Niraj Chag and songwriter Tasha Taylor-Johnson, toured the UK. It was a co-production with Watford Palace Theatre and HOME Manchester.

== Credits ==
=== Theatre ===
==== Directing ====
- Bollywood 2000 – Yet Another Love Story (2000, UK tour)
- The Deranged Marriage (2005, 2015 UK tour)
- Meri Christmas (2006, UK tour)
- There's Something About Simmy (2007, UK tour)
- Where's My Desi Soulmate? (2009, UK tour)
- Britain's Got Bhangra (2011, UK tour)
- Break The Floorboards (2013, UK tour)
- Happy Birthday Sunita (2014, 2023 UK tour)
- Laila The Musical (2016, UK tour)
- Miss Meena and the Masala Queens (2017, UK tour)
- Pyar Actually (2017, UK tour)
- Dishoom! (2018, UK tour)
- Abigail's Party (2022, Watford Palace Theatre)
- Glitterball (2022, UK tour)
- Frankie Goes To Bollywood (2024, UK tour)

==== Writing ====
- Bollywood 2000 – Yet Another Love Story (2000)
- The Deranged Marriage (2005)
- There's Something About Simmy (2007)
- Britain's Got Bhangra (2011)
- Laila The Musical (2016)
- Mushy: Lyrically Speaking (2019)
- Frankie Goes To Bollywood (2024)
- Surinderella (2025)

=== Film ===
==== Directing and writing ====
- Gods on Mountains (2008)
- The Deranged Marriage (2019)
- Little English (2022)
