= Mission Marigold =

Commemoration initiative for Indian Commonwealth soldiers

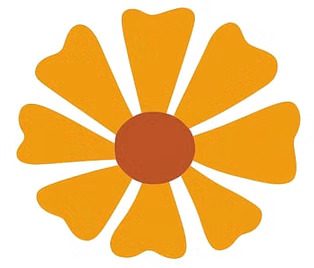
Mission Marigold

Mission Marigold is a commemorative initiative focused on the role of Indian soldiers who served with British and Allied forces during the First and Second World Wars. The campaign encourages the use of the marigold flower as a symbol of remembrance alongside the traditional poppy, aiming to increase awareness of the 1.4 million Indian troops who served in the First World War and the 2.5 million who served in the Second World War.

== Symbolism and adoption ==
The use of the marigold as a symbol of remembrance was selected by the United Service Institution of India (USI) with support from the British High Commission. The flower was chosen for its widespread presence in India and its saffron colour, which is associated with sacrifice in Indian culture.

The architecture of the Indian War Memorial at Villers-Guislain, France features the marigold, a traditional Indian symbol of sacrifice. The motif was included to provide a permanent cultural connection to the Indian soldiers who died in the First World War.

The symbol has been utilized in various commemorative events involving the British royal family. In 2016, Prince William and Catherine, Princess of Wales laid a wreath of marigolds at India Gate. During a visit to the Delhi War Cemetery, King Charles III (then Prince of Wales) wore a marigold alongside a remembrance poppy.

In the arts, the marigold was used as a commemorative symbol in The Indian Army at the Palace, a site-specific production by Pravesh Kumar at Hampton Court Palace exploring the presence of Indian soldiers at the site.

Former chairperson of the Foreign Affairs Committee Tom Tugendhat stated that UK-India relations could be strengthened by openly acknowledging their shared history of the First World War and by conducting a joint commemoration of the same.

In November 2025, an Early Day Motion (EDM 2264) was tabled in the UK Parliament by MP Navendu Mishra noting the initiative.

On 2nd June 2026, an Early Day Motion (EDM 247) was tabled in the UK Parliament by MP Bob Blackman which was signed by prominent British politicians like Nigel Farage among others marking the 110th anniversary of the Battle of Somme and honouring the service, sacrifice of Indian soldiers and noting the initiative.

To mark the 110th anniversary of the Battle of the Somme, Horizon Publications released The Somme 110: Commemorative Journal in June 2026. The journal also recognises the Mission Marigold initiative for its efforts to commemorate the service and sacrifice of Indian soldiers during the First World War.

== Educational Outreach ==
In the United Kingdom, the marigold has been incorporated into educational materials aimed at broadening awareness of the contribution of Indian soldiers during the World Wars. The Royal British Legion has included references to the marigold in its secondary school remembrance resources as part of its “Teaching Remembrance” programme. The initiative encourages discussion of the global dimensions of the conflict and highlights the participation of international troops alongside British forces. Educational assemblies and classroom materials have referenced literary works such as The Gift of India (1915) by Sarojini Naidu, which reflects on the sacrifices of Indian soldiers during the First World War. The inclusion of the marigold alongside the poppy has been presented as a symbolic acknowledgment that the United Kingdom was supported by troops from across the British Empire.
