= Rise of the Continents =

British television series

- Blu-Ray Disc cover
- Genre: Documentary
- Presented by: Iain Stewart
- Composer: Niraj Chag
- Country of origin: United Kingdom
- Original language: English
- No. of seasons: 1
- No. of episodes: 4

Production
- Executive producer: Jonathan Renouf
- Running time: 60 minutes

Original release
- Network: BBC Two
- Release: 9 June – 30 June 2013

Rise of the Continents is a British documentary television series that premiered on BBC Two on 9 June 2013. The four-part series is presented by geologist Iain Stewart. The series hypothesizes how 250 million years in the future, all of the continents will collide together once more, forming a new Pangea, with Eurasia right at its heart.

== Episodes ==
No.	Title	Director	Original air date (UK)
1	"Africa"	Peter Oxley	9 June 2013
2	"Australia"	Annabel Gillings	16 June 2013
3	"The Americas"	Arif Nurmohamed	23 June 2013
4	"Eurasia"	Stephen Cooter	30 June 2013

=== 1. "Africa" ===
Using clues like Africa's spectacular landmarks, mineral wealth and wildlife, Iain Stewart shows how the continent of Africa was formed from the wreckage of a long lost supercontinent. It features, among other things, creation of Victoria Falls, diamond mines of Sierra Leone, skeletons of early whales buried in the sand, and the nutrient-rich grass of the Serengeti Plains.

=== 2. "Australia" ===
This episode shows how Australia's journey as a continent has affected everything from Aboriginal history to modern day mining, and also the evolution of Australia's unique wildlife. Iain visits an opal mining town called Coober Pedy to recreate the breakup of Gondwana, and to also show how Australia's formation led to the creation of a vast underground aquifer. The episode also features cliffs of the Australian Bight which are a reminder to the times when Australia was once joined to Antarctica.

=== 3. "The Americas" ===
200 million years ago North and South America were carved from Pangaea, and pushed westwards as separate island continents. The episode explains how subduction has created the longest continual mountain range in the world - the Andes, and how 300 million years ago New York was at the heart of a huge mountain range. Using llama as an example, Iain explains how most of South America's wildlife originated in North America, and only came south when the two island continents of North and South America joined three million years ago.

=== 4. "Eurasia" ===
To reveal Eurasia's origins, Prof Iain Stewart climbs up to the "eternal flames" of Mount Chimaera and explains that where the South of Eurasia is today, there was once a ninety-million-square-kilometre Ocean known as the Tethys. Destruction of the Tethys Ocean led to Eurasia's formation. The freshwater fish called Karimeen, from the backwaters of Kerala in Southern India, is a clue that India was once four thousand kilometres south of its current position on the other side of the Tethys, joined to Madagascar.

== Merchandise ==
A two-disc DVD of the series was released by the BBC on 1 July 2013.
