= The Cleaner (British TV series) =

British television sitcom

- Genre: Sitcom
- Created by: Greg Davies
- Based on: Der Tatortreiniger
- Written by: Greg Davies
- Directed by: Tom Marshall; Dominic Brigstocke; Alex Winckler
- Starring: Greg Davies
- Composer: Samuel Karl Bohn
- Country of origin: United Kingdom
- Original language: English
- No. of series: 3
- No. of episodes: 19

Production
- Executive producers: Vivien Muller-Rommel; Ben Caudell; Alex Moody
- Producer: Sam Ward
- Editors: Gavin Buckley; Richard Halladey
- Running time: 30 minutes
- Production company: Studio Hamburg UK

Original release
- Network: BBC One
- Release: 10 September 2021 – present

The Cleaner is a British television sitcom created by and starring Greg Davies, which premiered on BBC One on 10 September 2021. The series is based on the German comedy Der Tatortreiniger ("Crime Scene Cleaner"). A second series, with a Christmas special, began airing on 23 December 2022. A third series was announced in January 2024 and began airing on 4 October 2024. In 2026 during an interview, Greg Davies revealed the continuation of the show, although it was too early to reveal details. Davies said "I've been told I'm not allowed to say much, but all I can tell you is, it's not over. The Cleaner is not finished, we're working on something." In July 2026, the BBC announced that there will be a one-off festive episode to be shown over the Christmas period.

== Plot ==
Paul "Wicky" Wickstead, a government-certified cleaning technician, is responsible for the removal of any signs of death, injury or other biohazard debris from crime scenes. In the course of his work, he gets to know a variety of people.

== Cast and characters ==
=== Main ===
- Greg Davies as Paul "Wicky" Wickstead, a crime scene cleaner who visits various people each episode
- Zita Sattar as PS Ruth Edwards, a police officer, who is a close friend (later girlfriend) of Wicky

=== Guest ===
- Helena Bonham Carter as Sheila. Sheila met her husband in business school; however, after she married him, she found herself bored. Sheila and her husband were married for at least 35 years. One day, after having reached the limit with her husband, she killed him. After meeting Wicky, they planned to go on holiday and then Sheila would turn herself in, but Wicky called the police at the last minute and Sheila was arrested (Ep.1)
- Shobu Kapoor as Neeta, Sheila's neighbour. She loves to bake and is extremely judgemental of any woman she meets who dislikes or doesn't do baking (Ep.1)
- Georgie Glen as Mrs Gathernoid, a fan of Terence's work who claims to invite him to an award ceremony, but he sees through her (Ep.2)
- Paul Chowdhry as "Man Boy", the son of neighbour Neeta (Ep.1)
- David Mitchell as Terence Redford, a struggling writer who is hostile to Wicky (Ep.2)
- Ruth Madeley as Helena, a young woman in a wheelchair who is vegan and has recently broken up with her partner (Ep.3)
- Stephanie Cole as Vivienne Hosier, an aristocrat who is very proud of her estate, especially her sofa, which she deems precious to her family history and notes many famous people who sat there (Ep.4)
- Donald Sumpter as Sir James, a close friend of Vivienne's who is quite traditional (Ep.4)
- Esmonde Cole as Tony (Ep.4)
- Layton Williams as 'Hosea' (Bernard), a young social media influencer who has an affinity with 1980s' culture, despite not having seen Back to the Future (Ep.5)
- Bill Skinner as Mickey Boy (Ep.5)
- Jo Hartley as Maggie (Ep.6)
- Sian Gibson as Wicky's sister (Christmas special)
- James Bolam as Wicky's father (Christmas special)
- Robbie Curran as Robert Kendrick (Christmas special)
- Harriet Walter as Lisa (Ep.8)
- Charlie Rawes as Cuddle (Ep.8)
- Simon Callow as Mr. Abahassine (Ep.9)
- John MacMillan as Strazzamo (Ep.9)
- Jemma Carlton as Selina (Ep.9)
- Asim Chaudhry as Kai (Ep.10)
- Amy Morgan as Manager (Ep.10)
- Alex Lawther as Shaman (Ep.11)
- Shakin' Stevens as Shaking Stephen (Ep.11)
- Zoë Wanamaker as Lucille, a descendant of a town founder (Ep.12)
- Susannah Fielding as Fran (Ep.12)
- Louis Emerick as Vince (Ep.12)
- Roisin Conaty as Her (Ep.13)
- Rudi Dharmalingam as Him (Ep.13)
- Mark Lewis Jones as Richard (Ep.13)
- Joshua McCord as Timber (Ep.13)
- Rosie Cavaliero as Marnie (Ep.14)
- Ben Willbond as Justin (Ep.14)
- Steve Pemberton as Donald (Ep.15)
- Vicki Pepperdine as Caroline (Ep.15)
- Gemma Whelan as Lara (Ep.15)
- Philippa Dunne as Margaret (Ep.16)
- Derek Griffiths as Bill (Ep.16)
- Sheila Reid as Maud (Ep.16)
- Roger Sloman as Frank (Ep.16)
- Paula Wilcox as Sue (Ep.16)
- Conleth Hill as Brennan (Ep.17)
- Sharon Rooney as Sue / Mrs. Barton / Tippy / Cook / Jibbers / John Church / Lady Rice Phillips (Ep.18)
- Harry Peacock as Bob Mammot (Ep.19)
- Rebekah Staton as Vivien Mammot (Ep.19)
- Sophia Dall'Aglio as Anne-Marie (Ep.19)
- Viraj Juneja as Ravi (Ep.19)
- Chaneil Kular as Manish (Ep.19)

== Episodes ==
Series	Episodes	Originally released	
Series	Episodes	First released	Last released
1	6	10 September 2021	22 October 2021
Special		23 December 2022	
2	6	24 March 2023	28 April 2023
3	6	4 October 2024	8 November 2024

=== Series 1 (2021) ===
No. overall	No. in series	Title	Directed by	Written by	BBC iPlayer release date	BBC One broadcast	UK viewers (millions) (Note: 7-day consolidated, including device viewership and pre-transmission viewing.)
1	1	"The Widow"	Tom Marshall	Greg Davies	10 September 2021	10 September 2021	3.42
Wicky is called to a suburban crime scene where everything is anything but normal. His efforts are impeded by the arrival of an officious neighbour, and then the rather eccentric murderer herself arrives to try and convince him into helping her abscond.
2	2	"The Writer"	Tom Marshall	Greg Davies	10 September 2021	17 September 2021	N/A (<3.03) (Note: Not reported in the weekly top 50 programmes for four-screen viewer ratings.)
Wicky deals with one of his more tricky clients, a prickly novelist who obsesses over quiet, resistance to unbottling his emotions, the subtleties of a classical author, and the contents of the sandwich in his packed lunch.
3	3	"The Neighbour"	Tom Marshall	Greg Davies	10 September 2021	24 September 2021	N/A (<2.95)
Wicky is left out in the cold when he's unable to attend his latest crime scene, needing to charge his phone; he goes next door and meets a blonde, wheelchair user. He assumes some of her problems have happened because she's disabled--like when he learnt she broke up with her boyfriend--but no, they broke up because he couldn't adjust to her veganism. They argue about veganism a bit, then he takes a break outside and spots her mum giving her meat soup. She explains her mum hasn't adjusted to her veganism nor to her car accident caused by her drunk driving. She explains her mum worries a lot about her, even though she's doing fine. After both enjoy smoking together and bond, then she lets him try a wheelchair and they go to the park to get vegan sausages. She spots her ex and Wicky realizes she still loves him. He promises to eat less meat so if the ex eats some then the total consumption of meat would be equal. That way she can make up with her ex with a clear conscience. She goes after him. When she's gone, Wicky gets up from the wheelchair and an older woman who had pushed him to the park calls him a liar.
4	4	"The Aristocrat"	Alex Winckler	Greg Davies	10 September 2021	1 October 2021	3.24
Wicky meets the owner of a house where a burglar has died. She tells him of famous visitors who have sat on her couch, including Winston Churchill. The elderly lady says she was on the stairs when he fell and cracked his neck. Whilst cleaning, Wicky spots a 1980 Aston Martin the lady doesn't use. When he continues cleaning he gets suspicious after looking at the blood patterns. He confronts her about it, and she admits she hit him with a golf club because he stood on her beloved couch. She claims no one would believe him if he reported it and tempts him with the car to stay quiet. Later Wicky stands on the couch as he tries to fix the curtains and the lady goes to hit him. She misses and she hits the couch. Wicky tells her it's not that important. Sadly she slips down the stairs on the mutton fat that her mate gave to Wicky to clean with which he forgot he'd left on the stairs.
5	5	"The Influencer"	Tom Marshall	Greg Davies	10 September 2021	8 October 2021	3.11
Wicky finds himself reliving his youth when called to clean the den of online influencer Hosea and discovers it's a shrine to the 1980s, before realising said influencer is desperately lacking a father figure (after his parents moved abroad without him when he was 16) and gets enlisted to recreate the crime scene to boost Hosea's flagging profile.
6	6	"The One"	Tom Marshall	Greg Davies	10 September 2021	22 October 2021 (Note: Originally due to be shown on 15 October 2021; following the murder of David Amess MP, this episode was pulled – alongside Have I Got News for You – and replaced with a Miranda repeat.)	N/A (<3.11)
Wicky's next job proves personal, when he learns he knows the owner of the holiday home he's cleaning up is a former girlfriend who left him twenty years ago on his thirtieth birthday. Having been besotted with her, catching up proves an awkward experience, especially as, after Wicky discovers a set of anonymous love letters, both receive some home truths about their time together.

=== Christmas special (2022) ===
No. overall	No. in series	Title	Directed by	Written by	Original release date	UK viewers (millions)
7	–	"A Clean Christmas"	Dominic Brigstocke	Greg Davies and Ronan Blaney	23 December 2022	N/A (<3.05)
Wicky is sent to clean up an ice cream parlour on Christmas Day, following the murder of the owner. He plans to attend a raffle at the pub afterwards, but one of the parlour's regular customers gets in his way.

=== Series 2 (2023) ===
No. overall	No. in series	Title	Directed by	Written by	Original release date	UK viewers (millions)
8	1	"The Transaction"	Tom Marshall	Greg Davies and Meg Salter	24 March 2023	3.04
Wicky is sent to clean up after the manager of a pub dies; conversations unveil secrets between the landlady of the pub, the now-deceased manager, and the surly bartender.
9	2	"The Clown"	Tom Marshall	Greg Davies and Paul Allen	31 March 2023	N/A (<2.71)
Wicky is called to a theatre after a brawl at a strip show, and while there meets the theatre's manager, a less than thrilled employee and a man scheduled for a performance later. After hearing about how he got became a performer, Wicky starts to think about the other career options he could have taken.
10	3	"The Nightshift"	Tom Marshall	Greg Davies	7 April 2023	N/A (<2.50)
While cleaning up after a shooting at an electronics store, Wicky meets the eccentric night-shift employee who appears to be a conspiracy theorist.
11	4	"The Shaman"	Tom Marshall	Greg Davies and Barry Castagnola	14 April 2023	N/A (<2.67)
Wicky's latest job, cleaning up after the death of a homeless man, is hampered by the presence of a shaman employed to free spirits from the property, whose obnoxious behaviour compels Wicky to become determined to expose him a fraud.
12	5	"The Statue"	Tom Marshall	Greg Davies and Mike Wozniak	21 April 2023	N/A (<2.50)
Wicky finds himself caught up in a contentious debate around the removal of a statue of a controversial local historical figure after he is employed by the local council to clean up after a protest carried out by a descendent of its subject against the replacement statue of a giant chickpea.
13	6	"The Dead End"	Dominic Brigstocke	Greg Davies	28 April 2023	N/A (<2.55)
After Wicky is called out to rural Wales to clean up after a brutal murder, he begins to re-evaluate his life after a discussion with the undertaker.

=== Series 3 (2024) ===
No. overall	No. in series	Title	Directed by	Written by	Original release date	UK viewers (millions)
14	1	"The Reunion"	Tom Marshall	Greg Davies	4 October 2024	2.80
15	2	"The Baby"	Tom Marshall	Greg Davies	11 October 2024	2.55
16	3	"The Committee"	Tom Marshall	Greg Davies	18 October 2024	N/A (<2.47)
17	4	"The Lighthouse"	Tom Marshall	Greg Davies	25 October 2024	N/A (<2.37)
18	5	"The Housekeeper"	Tom Marshall	Greg Davies	1 November 2024	N/A (<2.50)
19	6	"The Wedding"	Tom Marshall	Greg Davies	8 November 2024	N/A (<2.55)
