= Get Duked! =

2019 British comedy film

- Film poster
- Directed by: Ninian Doff
- Written by: Ninian Doff
- Produced by: Brian Coffey; Matthew Plouffe; Laura Tunstall; Tobey Maguire
- Starring: Samuel Bottomley; Viraj Juneja; Rian Gordon; Lewis Gribben; Eddie Izzard; Kate Dickie; Georgie Glen; James Cosmo
- Cinematography: Patrick Meller
- Edited by: Ninian Doff; Ross Hallard
- Music by: Alex Menzies
- Production companies: Material Pictures; Highland Midgie; Nowhere
- Distributed by: Amazon Studios
- Release dates: 8 March 2019 (South by Southwest); 28 August 2020 (United States)
- Running time: 87 minutes
- Country: United Kingdom
- Language: English

Get Duked! (originally titled Boyz in the Wood) is a 2019 British black comedy adventure film written and directed by Ninian Doff in his feature directorial debut. The film premiered at the 2019 South by Southwest Film Festival and was released by Amazon Studios on Amazon Prime Video on 28 August 2020.

== Plot ==
Three problematic students—Dean, Duncan, and DJ Beatroot—are taken to the Scottish Highlands by teacher Mr. Carlyle to try to achieve the Duke of Edinburgh Award, which requires participants to navigate the Highlands as a team relying only on a paper map. The three are joined by the bookish student Ian, who wants to receive the award to improve his college application.

Carlyle drives off in the minibus, instructing the boys to meet him at a designated campsite. The boys reluctantly set out, but spirits rise when Dean reveals he has hash. Unbeknownst to them, a man watches through a rifle scope as the boys get high.

The boys encounter a farmer plowing his field. After getting directions from him, DJ Beatroot gives the farmer his mix CD. Sometime later the boys spot a man in upper class hunting gear and ask him for help, but as he nears they see he is wearing a mask and he begins firing at them. Fleeing, the stoned boys decide he must be the "Duke of Edinburgh." The bumbling Dean and Duncan manage to improvise a trap that improbably sets the "Duke's" leg on fire, forcing him to retreat.

The boys reach the campsite and find Carlyle, who has a burn on his right leg. Believing that he is the Duke and that he will kill them, Duncan sneaks to the minibus and runs Carlyle over. The other boys freak out, but they ultimately decide to make Carlyle's apparent death look like an accident by having the minibus drive off a cliff. However, after they put Carlyle's body in the vehicle, it starts rolling back down a long hill. Duncan says it will most likely fall off a cliff anyway and the boys continue on.

Meanwhile, the local police, Sergeant Morag and PC Hamish, interrupt their search for a notorious bread thief after Morag receives an erroneous report that Duncan is a terrorist and is loose in the area. They set off for the boys' last known location.

The boys then encounter the Duke again, who is joined by his equally insane sword-wielding wife, the "Duchess." The boys realize to their dismay that Mr. Carlyle was not the Duke after all. As they flee, Ian falls into a ditch and is separated from the others. DJ Beatroot then argues with Dean and Duncan and sets off for a barn in the distance while the other two head to a cave to ingest a load of powdered soup.

Inside the barn DJ Beatroot is shocked to find a large group of farmers who are big fans—the farmer he encountered earlier has been sharing his mixtape CD. He stays to party with them and holds an impromptu concert. Elsewhere, the Duke and Duchess capture Ian; Dean and Duncan, covered in powdered soup, hear his cries and rush off to help. Just as it looks like all is lost DJ Beatroot and the farmers appear and chase off the Duke and Duchess after stealing their weapons.

The next morning boys decide to hunt down the Duke and Duchess. They finally corner the pair on a shoreline. The villains, held at weapon-point, explain that modern youths must be culled because they are too bratty and ungrateful. Dean retorts that adults have wrecked the world and left young people to clean up the mess. Suddenly, more well-dressed, masked hunters join the Duke and Duchess, holding the boys at gunpoint. They prepare to execute the boys, when the minibus rolls off a cliff onto the hunters, crushing them all to death. The relieved boys look inside the minibus and are overjoyed to see that Mr. Carlyle is in fact still alive, if only barely. After makeshift medical treatment, the severely injured Carlyle springs up and says that the boys are in big trouble for trying to kill him. The police, Morag and Hamish, appear. As Carlyle tries to tell Morag about the boys running him over, Hamish discovers a huge stash of stolen bread in the back of the minibus—it turns out that Carlyle was the notorious bread thief. The boys cover for him by telling Morag that the van belonged to the crushed hunters. In gratitude Carlyle agrees to give the boys the Duke of Edinburgh Award and they are celebrated as heroes.

== Cast ==
- Kate Dickie as Sergeant Morag
- Kevin Guthrie as PC Hamish
- Jonathan Aris as Mr. Carlyle
- Georgie Glen as The Duchess
- Alice Lowe as Superintendent
- Brian Pettifer as PC Dougie
- James Cosmo as Farmer
- Eddie Izzard as The Duke
- Samuel Bottomley as Ian
- Rian Gordon as Dean
- Lewis Gribben as Duncan
- Viraj Juneja as DJ Beatroot

== Release ==
The film premiered as the opening Midnight Movie at the 2019 South by Southwest Film Festival. It opened the 2019 Edinburgh International Film Festival, and also screened at festivals including the Vancouver International Film Festival and International Film Festival Rotterdam. Amazon Studios acquired the film in December 2019. On 4 August 2020, it was announced that the film's title was changed to Get Duked! It was released on Amazon Prime Video on 28 August 2020.

== Reception ==
=== Critical response ===
On review aggregator website Rotten Tomatoes, the film holds an approval rating of 87% based on 95 reviews, with an average rating of 7.1/10. The site's critics consensus reads, "The rare comedy thriller that's funny as well as thrilling, Get Duked! marks writer-director Ninian Doff as a filmmaker with a bright future." On Metacritic, the film has a weighted average score of 69 out of 100, based on 24 critics, indicating "generally favorable reviews".

Writing in /Film, Matt Donato called the film a "winningly outrageous classist satire" and "the hippest, wildest, most energetic genre blowout to come from the UK since Attack the Block." Rob Hunter of Film School Rejects called it "a wildly satisfying genre blast about underdogs out of their element." Brian Tallerico of RogerEbert.com wrote, "Its best moments pulse with creative energy, propelled by a playful cast that includes the great Eddie Izzard." Joe Blessing of The Playlist wrote, "Underneath the jokes and adolescent banter is a tightly constructed script, filled with running jokes and surprises that all pay off in a bonkers finale." Bobby LePire of Film Threat praised the film as "nothing short of a masterpiece." Alistair Harkness of The Scotsman called it "a riotous teen movie/horror mash-up that confidently veers from gross-out humour to surreal flights of fancy to crude, but surprisingly pointed, social commentary without overstaying its welcome." John DeFore of The Hollywood Reporter wrote, "A Boy Scout-like challenge becomes a brogue-filled Most Dangerous Game," adding that "the film gets more fun as it goes, especially after an unlikely hallucinogen makes its entrance."

Variety praised Doff's directing and the ensemble's performance "Get Duked! doesn’t seem the slightest bit ashamed to be silly, and Doff does a terrific job juggling the film’s unique mix of broad humour and horror-movie cues. He clearly understands comic timing, which applies both to the game cast’s consistently amusing antics and recurring gags that have no business being as funny as they are the first time, much less upon repetition." They also praised Juneja's performance in particular, stating "Dean (Rian Gordon), Duncan (Lewis Gribben) and William (Viraj Juneja). The latter insists on being referred to by his (latest) hip-hop handle, DJ Beatroot, and could well be the breakout star of the bunch, the way John Boyega stole the not-dissimilar “Attack the Block” nearly a decade earlier."

=== Accolades ===
The film won The 2019 Midnighters Audience Award at South by Southwest Film Festival, Best International Feature at the Lund International Fantastic Film Festival and Best Youth Film at Tallinn Black Nights Film Festival, and was nominated for the British Independent Film Award for Best Debut Director.
