= Terence Maynard =

British actor

- Born: 1969 (age 56–57); Liverpool, England
- Occupation: Actor
- Years active: 1994–present

Terence Maynard (born 1969) is a British actor. He is known for his roles as Stuart in the sports drama series Dream Team, and as Tony Stewart in the soap opera Coronation Street.

Born in Liverpool, Maynard would be raised in Nantwich. He would study acting at Guildford School of Acting. Maynard's film credits include roles in Reign of Fire, Chasing Liberty, Revolver, and Edge of Tomorrow.

Maynard would join the cast of Coronation Street in 2013, taking the role of Stewart over from Alan Igbon. He would appear in the role from 2014 to 2015 before departing. In 2019, Maynard join the cast of the Netflix adaptation of The Witcher in a recurring role. In 2022, he was cast in the ITV series Ridley. In July 2024, he was cast in NCIS: Tony & Ziva.

On stage, Maynard has starred in Shakespeare productions such including Othello and Macbeth, as Billy Flynn in Chicago, and as Gabriel Maxson in a 2013 production of Fences.

== Filmography ==
=== Film ===
Year	Title	Role	Notes
1994	Ladybird, Ladybird	Social Worker	
2002	Reign of Fire	Gideon	
2004	Chasing Liberty	Harper	
2005	Revolver	French Paul	
2008	A Bunch of Amateurs	London Journalist	
2013	All Things to All Men	Sands	
2014	Edge of Tomorrow	Cruel Sergeant	
2018	Death Race: Beyond Anarchy	Valentine	Direct to video
2018	The Marine 6: Close Quarters	Shawn Taylor	Direct to video
2019	Avengement	Stokes	
2020	Infidel	Cameron Dell	
2020	The Last Days of American Crime	Chucky	
2021	One Shot	Tom Shields	
2022	Warhunt	Morgan	

=== Television ===
Year	Title	Role	Notes
1995	Harry	Steve	1 episode
1996	Cold Lazarus	1st MSC Guard	Miniseries, 2 episodes
1998	Terror in the Mall	David Geha	Television film
1998-1999	Roger Roger	Andre	Main role, 13 episodes
1998-2017	Casualty	Various roles	5 episodes
2000; 2007	The Bill	Dwight / Richard Andrews	2 episodes
2001	Waking the Dead	James Britten	2 episodes
2001	EastEnders	Andy	4 episodes
2002-2003	Judge John Deed	Dr. Tim Vaughn	2 episodes
2002-2004	Dream Team	Stuart Naysmith	Main role, 62 episodes
2002; 2005	Doctors	John Chilcott / Morris Knapper	2 episodes
2003	Mile High	D-Tox	1 episode
2005	Empire	Atticus	Miniseries, 3 episodes
2005-2006	Silent Witness	D.C.I. Connors	3 episodes
2006-2007	Young Dracula	Eric Van Helsing	Main role, 26 episodes
2007	City Lights	Oz Morris	1 episode
2007	Holby City	Anton Matthews	4 episodes
2008	That Mitchell and Webb Look	Various roles	2 episodes
2009	Primeval	Chauffeur	1 episode
2009	Father & Son	Barrington	Miniseries, 4 episodes
2009	The Sarah Jane Adventures	Madison Yorke	2 episodes
2009	Miranda	Self Defence Teacher	1 episode
2010	Law & Order: UK	Mick Monroe	1 episode
2011	DCI Banks	Barry Clough	2 episodes
2011	Merlin	Helios	3 episodes
2011-2012	Spy	Marion Portis	Recurring role, 11 episodes
2012	Public Enemies	Colin Bolt	Miniseries, 3 episodes
2012	Strike Back	Curtis	1 episode
2013	The Bible	Commander of the Lord's Army	Miniseries, 1 episode
2013	Wizards vs Aliens	Joseph Jacana	2 episodes
2014	Alarm for Cobra 11 – The Highway Police	Hillerman	1 episode
2014-2015	Coronation Street	Tony Stewart	Main role, 222 episodes
2016	Grantchester	Larry Simpkins	1 episode
2018	Ransom	Tony	1 episode
2018	Midsomer Murders	Ashley Denton	1 episode
2019	Death in Paradise	Dezzie Dixon	1 episode
2019-2023	The Witcher	Artorius Vigo	Recurring role, 9 episodes
2020	Survive	Doctor M	Miniseries, 2 episodes
2020	Cursed	Brother Salt	3 episodes
2021	Time	Kavanagh	2 episodes
2021	FBI: International	Bill Davies	1 episode
2022	Sherwood	DS Cleaver	Recurring role, 6 episodes
2022-present	Ridley	DCI Paul Goodwin	Main role, 12 episodes
2024	Professor T.	Prison Officer Levi Burridge	3 episodes
2025	The Bombing of Pan Am 103	Gabe Lepley	Miniseries, 3 episodes
2025	The Hack	Rufus Duffy	Miniseries, 3 episodes
2025	NCIS: Tony & Ziva	Dr. Lang	Main role, 4 episodes

=== Theatre ===
Year	Title	Role	Theatre
1994–1995	The Threepenny Opera	Smith	Donmar Warehouse
1994	Pal Joey	Victor	Belgrade Theatre
1995-1996	The Duchess of Malfi	The Court, Officers, Madmen & Executioners	Theatre Royal, Bury St Edmunds
1995-1996	The Duchess of Malfi	The Court, Officers, Madmen & Executioners	Wyndham's Theatre
1997	As You Like It	Orlando	Leeds Playhouse
1999	Antony and Cleopatra	Agrippa/Demetrius	Shakespeare's Globe
1999	Julius Caesar	Metellus Cimber/Varrus/Volumnius/Flavius	Shakespeare's Globe
2000	Othello	Othello	York Theatre Royal
2001-2002	Twelfth Night	Duke Orsino	Shakespeare's Globe
2005	Macbeth	Macbeth	York Theatre Royal
2011-2012	Chicago	Billy Flynn	Garrick Theatre
2013	Fences	Gabriel Maxson	Theatre Royal, Bath
