= Georgie Glen =

British actress

- Born: 20 April 1956 (age 70); Helensburgh, Scotland
- Occupation: Actress
- Years active: 1986–present
- Notable credit(s): Heartbeat (2000–2001, 2003–2005, 2009); Little Britain (2003–2005); Waterloo Road (2012–2015); Hetty Feather (2018–2020); Call the Midwife (2018–); The Crown (2020)
- Children: 2

Georgie Glen (born 20 April 1956) is a Scottish actress, best known for her roles as Miss Higgins in the BBC One period drama series Call the Midwife from 2018 onwards, and as history teacher Audrey McFall in the BBC One school-based drama series Waterloo Road from 2012 to 2015.

== Life and career ==
Glen is from Helensburgh in Dunbartonshire (now in Argyll and Bute), Scotland, and graduated from Glasgow School of Art with a degree in graphic design. She worked at Thames and Hudson publishers as an assistant book designer for five years before studying at the Bristol Old Vic Theatre School for two years. After graduating she worked for a year at Wolsey Theatre in Ipswich, England.

She has featured in the BBC One drama series Call the Midwife, Waterloo Road, and Les Misérables as Mother Abbess; in 2012, she appeared in the film Les Misérables as Madame Baptistine. Additional period performances include Hannah More in the 2006 film Amazing Grace, John Ruskin's mother in the drama Desperate Romantics about the Pre-Raphaelite Brotherhood, as well as lady-in-waiting to Judi Dench's characters in both Shakespeare in Love and Mrs. Brown.

Since 2018, she has been cast in the role of Millicent Higgins, a GP receptionist, in Call the Midwife.

Other notable performances include a recurring role in Heartbeat as Sgt Jennifer Noakes, and one of the eponymous Calendar Girls. Glen has also portrayed various characters in comedies including Little Britain and Harry Enfield and Chums, as well as a guest role in The Thick of It and one episode of The Sarah Jane Adventures.

She appeared in series four of Netflix drama The Crown in 2020 playing Ruth Roche, Lady Fermoy, the maternal grandmother of Lady Diana Spencer and lady-in-waiting to the Queen Mother.

== Personal life ==
She has twin daughters called Holly and Nell.

== Filmography ==
=== Film ===
Year	Film	Role	Notes
1995	Blue Juice	Hotel Receptionist	
1997	Mothertime	Sister Louise	
1997	Mrs Brown	Lady Churchill	
1998	What Rats Won't Do	Woman with Dog	
1998	Shakespeare in Love	Lady in Waiting	
2000	The Little Vampire	Babysitter Lorna	
2001	Lucky Break	Audience Member	
2003	Calendar Girls	Kathy	
2005	Dating Ray Renwick	Marjorie	Short film
2006	Amazing Grace	Hannah More	
2008	Easy Virtue	Mrs. Landrigin	
2009	Pigsy Doodle	Mum	Short film
2011	Hysteria	Mrs. Parsons	
2011	My Week with Marilyn	Rosamund Greenwood	
2012	Les Misérables	Madame Baptistine	
2015	Where Do We Go from Here?	Woman at Bar	
2015	A Lot Meant		Short film
2016	Jackie	Rose Kennedy	
2017	The Hitman's Bodyguard	ICC Lead Judge	
2019	Get Duked!	The Duchess	
2019	The Cure	Heather Wood	
2021	Hitman's Wife's Bodyguard	ICC Lead Judge	
2026	Elsinore	Jean	

=== Television ===
Year	Series	Role	Notes
1988	The Bell-Run	Scottish Barmaid	Television film
1992	A Time to Dance	Andrew's Secretary	Miniseries
1992	Harry Enfield's Television Programme	Social Worker	Episode: "Series 2, Episode 1"
1994	Screen Two	Margaret Summer	Episode: "O Mary This London"
1995	The Bill	Sophie Mallin	Episode: "Other Voices"
1995	Tears Before Bedtime	Rival Couple	Episode: "Series 1, Episode 1"
1995	London's Burning	Mrs. Wickston	Episode: "Series 8, Episode 2"
1995	Soldier Soldier	Georgina Bennett	Episode: "Far Away"
1995	The Great Kandinsky	Vicar Shelley	Television film
1996	Doctor Finlay	Rosemary Bain	Episode: "Days of Grace"
1996	No Bananas	Agnes Harding	Episode: "Sitzkreig"
1997	True Tilda	Nurse	Miniseries
1997	As Time Goes By	Miss Wessel	Episode: "The Psychotherapist"
1997	Screen Two	Sister Louise	Episode: "Mothertime"
1997	Peak Practice	Myra Eburne	Episode: "The Price"
1997–1998	Harry Enfield & Chums	Various	Recurring role; 6 episodes
1998	Jonathan Creek	Mrs. Kilby	Episode: "The Problem at Gallows Gate"
1998	In the Red	Assistant to D.G.	Miniseries; 3 episodes
1998	Berkeley Square	Lady Annabelle Wilton	Miniseries; 3 episodes
1998	Big Cat	Bank Customer	Television film
1998	Alas Smith and Jones	Various	Recurring role; 3 episodes
1998	The Children of the New Forest	Phoebe	Miniseries
1999	Tilly Trotter	Mabel Price	Miniseries; 2 episodes
1999	All Along the Watchtower	Mrs. Mulvey	Miniseries; 6 episodes
1999	Wives and Daughters	Miss Hornblower	Miniseries; 2 episodes
2000	The Railway Children	Aunt Emma	Television film
2000	Hearts and Bones	Pamela	Episode: "There Is a Light That Never Goes Out"
2000	Harry Enfield's Brand Spanking New Show	Various	Recurring role; 2 episodes
2000–2009	Heartbeat	Sergeant Nokes	Recurring role; 9 episodes
2001	Holby City	Anne Owen	Episode: "Release"
2001	The Armando Iannucci Shows	Nun	Episode: "Time Passing"
2002	The American Embassy	Landlady	Episode: "Driven"
2002	Always and Everyone	Eleanor Smedley	Episode: "Do Not Pass Go"
2002	Daniel Deronda	Lady Mallinger	Miniseries; 3 episodes
2002	Dalziel and Pascoe	Headmistress	Episode: "Dialogues of the Dead"
2003	My Family	Mrs. Gleaves	Episode: "They Shoot Harpers, Don't They?"
2003–2005	Little Britain	Various	Recurring role; 6 episodes
2004	Nighty Night	Sister May	Episode: "Series 1, Episode 6"
2004	Doctors	Chrissie Franklin	Episode: "Rotten Eggs"
2004	Doc Martin	Mrs. Willow	Episode: "Shit Happens"
2005	Taggart	Mrs. Campbell	Episode: "The Ties That Bind"
2005	Sea of Souls	Consultant	Episode: "Empty Promise"
2005	Angel of Death	Nurse Kate Lock	Television film
2005	The Thick of It	Susan Dorling	Episode: "Series 1, Episode 3"
2005	Housewife, 49	Mrs. Hockey	Television film
2005	Cutting It	Mrs. McClair	Episode: "Series 4, Episode 3"
2005	Rome	Poppaea	Episode: "Egeria"
2005	Love Soup	Woman in Store	Episode: "Death and Nurses"
2005	Nighty Night	Bluebell	Recurring role; 3 episodes
2005	The Worst Week of My Life	Moira	Episode: "Tuesday"
2006	Elizabeth David: A Life in Recipes	Pamela	Television film
2006	Thin Ice	Sheen	Episode #1.4
2006	The Bill	Mrs. Willis	Episode: "The Green Eyed Monster"
2006	The Line of Beauty	Eileen	Episode: "The End of the Street"
2006	The Amazing Mrs Pritchard	Anne Lister	Episode: "Episode 4"
2007	The Whistleblowers	Tribunal Chief	Episode: "Fit for Purpose"
2007	Holby City	Rosemary Greaves	Episode: "I Feel Pretty"
2007	After You've Gone	Mrs. Grierson	Episode: "Ride of the Valkyrie"
2007	To the Manor Born	Panel Chairman	Episode: "Christmas Special"
2008	Filth: The Mary Whitehouse Story	Norah Buckland	Television film
2008	The Long Walk to Finchley	Miss Harris	Television film
2008	The Wrong Door	Various	Episode: "The World's Most Annoying Creature"
2008	Agatha Christie's Poirot	Mrs. Forbes	Episode: "Cat Among the Pigeons"
2008	The Sarah Jane Adventures	Mrs. King	Episode: "The Temptation of Sarah Jane Smith"
2009	Doctors	Dorothy Bakewell	Recurring role; 5 episodes
2009	Genie in the House	Colette	Episode: "Flower Power"
2009	Desperate Romantics	Mrs. Ruskin	Miniseries; 4 episodes
2009	Doc Martin	Barbara	Episode: "Better the Devil"
2009	The Impressions Show with Culshaw and Stephenson	Various	Recurring role; 4 episodes
2010	Foyle's War	Mrs. Ramsay	Episode: "The Hide"
2010	Holby City	Edie O'Connor	Episode: "The Last Day of Summer"
2010	Harry & Paul	Various	Recurring role; 2 episodes
2010	New Tricks	Anne Hargreaves	Episode: "The Fourth Man"
2011	Mid Morning Matters with Alan Partridge	Polly Maplin	Recurring role; 2 episodes
2011	Twenty Twelve	School Receptionist	Episode: "Raising The Bar"
2011	Sirens	Maureen Greenwick	Episode: "King of the Jungle"
2012	The Royal Bodyguard	Miss Gifford	Miniseries; 2 episodes
2012	Coming Up	Sister Margaret	Episode: "Ben and Lump"
2012–2015	Waterloo Road	Audrey McFall	Series regular; 69 episodes
2014	Warren United	Warren's Mother	Recurring role
2014	Playhouse Presents	Team Leader	Episode: "Damned"
2014	Boomers	Emma	Episode: "Thurnemouth Day"
2014	Mount Pleasant	Patty	Episode: "Series 4, Episode 3"
2014	Bob Servant	Sheriff	Episode: "Court"
2014–2016	The Evermoor Chronicles	Aunt Bridget	Recurring role; 24 episodes
2015	Hoff the Record	Miss Dunwoody	Episode: "The United Nations"
2015	Mountain Goats	Irene	Episode: "Liar"
2016	Silent Witness	Professor Belinda Roach	Episode: "After the Fall"
2016	I Want My Wife Back	Florence	Episode: "Chapter Three"
2016	The Collection	Mother Superior	Recurring role; 3 episodes
2016–2018	Damned	Denise	Series regular; 12 episodes
2017	Quacks	Mrs. Pope	Episode: "The Duke's Tracheotomy"
2017-2025	Midsomer Murders	Mary Oswood	Episode: "Death by Persuasion"
2017-2025	Midsomer Murders	Moira Mayhew	Episode: "Top of the Class"
2018	Sally4Ever	Pat	Recurring role; 3 episodes
2018	Defending the Guilty	Judge Minton	Episode: "Pilot"
2018	Death on the Tyne	Hilda	Television film
2018–2020	Hetty Feather	Lady Grenford	Series regular; 20 episodes
2018–present	Call the Midwife	Millicent Higgins	Series regular
2019	Les Misérables	Abbess	Episode: "Episode 3"
2019	Pure	Dr. Geary	Episode: "Episode 1"
2019	The Victim	Judge	Miniseries; 4 episodes
2019	GameFace	Pam	Episode: "Pickle"
2019	Dial M for Middlesbrough	Hilda	Television film
2020	Maxxx	Sister Margaret	Episode: "Death"
2020	The Crown	Ruth, Lady Fermoy	Recurring role; 4 episodes
2021	Behind Her Eyes	Sue	Miniseries; 4 episodes
2021	The Cleaner	Mrs. Gathernoid	Episode: "The Writer"
2021	The Larkins	Lady Bluff-Gore	Recurring role; 3 episodes
2022	Inside No. 9	Dinah	Episode: "Wise Owl"
2022–2024	Ridley	Wendy Newstone	12 episodes
2022–2025	Am I Being Unreasonable?	Clarissa Baggot	Recurring role; 6 episodes
2023	Summer Camp Island	Adult Mildred (voice)	Recurring role; 2 episodes
2025	Juice	Bertha	Episode: "The Storm is Coming"
