= NCIS: Tony & Ziva =

2025 American television series

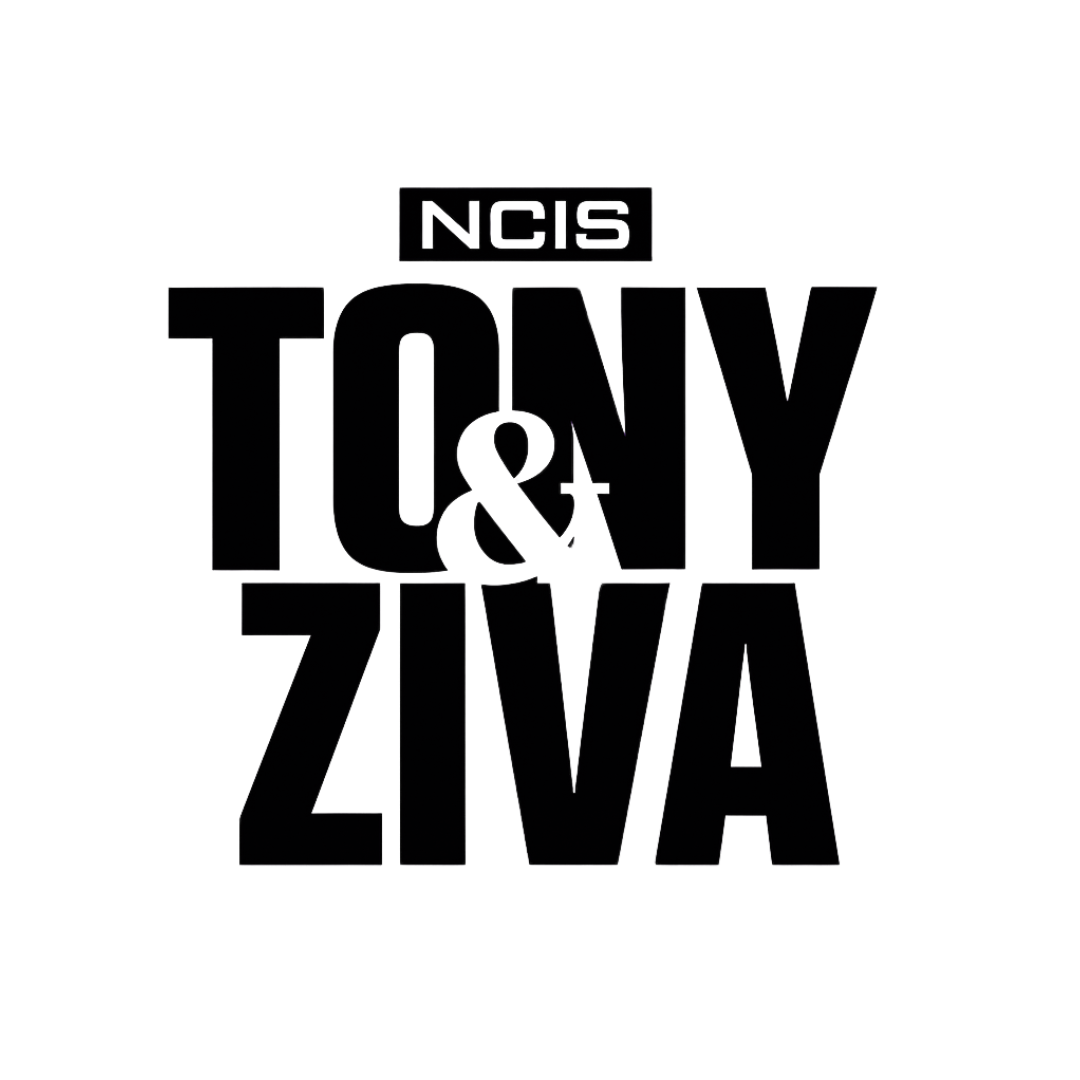
- Genre: Military; Action drama; Police procedural
- Created by: John McNamara
- Starring: Michael Weatherly; Cote de Pablo; Isla Gie; Amita Suman; Maximilian Osinski; Anne-Marie Waldeck; Lara Rossi; Julian Ovenden; James D'Arcy; Nassima Benchicou; Terence Maynard; Emmanuel Bonami
- Country of origin: United States
- Original language: English
- No. of seasons: 1
- No. of episodes: 10

Production
- Executive producers: John McNamara; Michael Weatherly; Cote de Pablo; Mairzee Almas; Laurie Lieser; Shelley Meals; Christina Straine
- Producer: David A. Rosemont
- Production companies: Plastic Infinity Productions; Source Collective Productions; McNamara Moving Company; Paramount+; CBS Studios

Original release
- Network: Paramount+
- Release: September 4 – October 23, 2025

Related
- NCIS; NCIS: Los Angeles; NCIS: New Orleans; NCIS: Hawaiʻi; NCIS: Origins; NCIS: Sydney; NCIS: New York

NCIS: Tony & Ziva is an American television series on Paramount+, a spin-off of the long-running crime procedural NCIS. The series premiered on September 4, 2025. In December 2025, the series was canceled after one season.

== Summary ==
Picking up from early 2020 when Ziva had flown to Paris to reunite with Tony and Tali, the family has led a peaceful life in Paris; Tony is the head of a private security firm while Ziva owns a language school. Although not together romantically, Tony and Ziva co-parent their daughter while Ziva undergoes therapy sessions. However, their lives are interrupted when an unknown assailant attempts to steal Interpol funds using a mysterious tech program called 9.4, framing Tony for the crime. Now, Tony and Ziva join forces with 9.4's designer, a hacker named Boris Peskov, to find the ultimate culprit behind 9.4 and clear their names. Flashbacks throughout the series show how Tony and Ziva's relationship fell through, pointing to how they come back together in the present while on the run.

== Cast ==
- Michael Weatherly as Anthony DiNozzo, a former NCIS special agent now the head of a cybersecurity company
- Cote de Pablo as Ziva David, a former NCIS special agent now heading a non-profit organization
- Isla Gie as Tali DiNozzo, daughter of Tony and Ziva
  - Olivia Brody as Young Tali
- Amita Suman as Claudette Caron, a colleague of Tony
- Lara Rossi as Sophie Summers, a special-ops babysitter of Tali
- Maximilian Osinski as Boris Peskov, hacker behind 9.4
- Anne-Marie Waldeck as Fruzsi Gortva, Boris' fiancée
- Julian Ovenden as Jonah Markham, Director of Interpol and the main antagonist
- James D'Arcy as Henry Rayner-Hunt, Tony's friend from Interpol
- Nassima Benchicou as Martine Aranow, an Interpol agent and accomplice of Jonah Markham
- Terence Maynard as Dr. Lang, Ziva's psychologist
- Emmanuel Bonami as Pierre Galimard, Martine's minion
- Sean Pertwee as Aaron Graves, a weapons manufacturer who is targeted by Jonah and Martine

== Episodes ==
No.	Title	Directed by	Written by	Original release date
1	"No Country is Safe (Kein Land ist sicher)"	Mairzee Almas	John McNamara	September 4, 2025
2	"No Friend of Mine"	Mairzee Almas	Mike Moore	September 4, 2025
3	"Cover Story"	Valerie Weiss	Shelley Meals	September 4, 2025
4	"Wedding Crashers"	Valerie Weiss	Jay Gard & Alex Raiman	September 11, 2025
5	"To Be Determined"	M. J. Bassett	Kiersten Stanley & John McNamara	September 18, 2025
6	"We've Got Company"	M. J. Bassett	Christina Strain	September 25, 2025
7	"Dark Mirror"	Tessa Blake	Mike Moore & Christina Strain	October 2, 2025
8	"Fire Sale"	Tessa Blake	Jay Gard & Alex Raiman	October 9, 2025
9	"Ride or Die"	Dennis Smith	Teleplay by : Sarah Moen & Shelley Meals; Story by : Shelley Meals	October 16, 2025
10	"Full Circle"	Dennis Smith	Joseph Mireles & John McNamara	October 23, 2025

== Production ==
The series stars Michael Weatherly and Cote de Pablo reprising their roles as former NCIS special agents Tony DiNozzo and Ziva David, respectively, and marks their first time appearing together in 12 years since NCIS season 11 episode "Past, Present, and Future".

The spin-off reunites the two characters and centers on the events that shaped their storyline in Europe. Weatherly was part of the original NCIS cast until his departure in 2016 but returned in 2024 for a special tribute episode honoring David McCallum, who portrayed Dr. Donald "Ducky" Mallard for 20 seasons, while de Pablo was a series regular from seasons 3 to 11 and made guest appearances in seasons 16 and 17.

It is the seventh series set within the NCIS universe—also referred to as the "NCIS-verse"—and the first developed exclusively for a streaming platform. In mid-June 2025, it was confirmed that the series would premiere on September 4, 2025.

The showrunner for NCIS: Tony & Ziva described the project as "an unconventional love story." Both Weatherly and de Pablo also served as executive producers on the series, which they had reportedly been developing for several years. The storyline opens by revisiting and explaining the reasons behind the characters' departure in the original series.

In mid-May 2024, the first official podcast of the NCIS universe, Off Duty: An NCIS Rewatch, premiered on Spotify. Hosted by de Pablo and Weatherly, the podcast revisits the show's most memorable episodes with behind-the-scenes commentary. In July 2025, de Pablo stated that she declined to have an intimacy coordinator on set with Weatherly – even though she was offered to have one – because she felt they have a lot of trust with each other as they are friends and did not "want to be micromanaged".

On December 19, 2025, Paramount+ canceled the series after one season.

== Release ==
In June 2025, it was announced that the series would debut September 4, 2025, with three episodes exclusively on Paramount+ in the United States and a number of territories. Following the premiere, new episodes would drop weekly on Thursdays, with the season finale on October 23, 2025.

== Reception ==
On Rotten Tomatoes, the series holds an approval rating of 82% based on 11 critic reviews. On Metacritic, it has a weighted average score of 73 out of 100 based on 6 critics, indicating "generally favorable".
