= Viraj Juneja =

English actor

- Education: Identity School of Acting
- Occupation: Actor
- Years active: 2018-present
- Known for: Get Duked!; Little English; Horrible Histories

Viraj Juneja is an English actor, playwright and composer from London. His films include Get Duked! (2019) and Little English (2022). On television, he appeared in the CBBC series Horrible Histories (2023–2025) and Horrible Science (2025), and the BBC One series The Cleaner (2024).

== Early life ==
Juneja is from West London and of Indian descent. He attended The Questors Theatre and Identity School of Acting.

== Career ==
Juneja made his television debut as Richard Huskerton in the BBC medical soap opera Doctors (2018) before making his feature film debut as DJ Beatroot in the 2019 Prime Video Original comedy Get Duked!, directed by Ninian Doff. The film was produced by Tobey Maguire and premiered at the South by Southwest (SXSW) Film Festival in Austin Texas and went on to the win the audience award in the 'Midnighters' category. Variety (magazine) described Juneja's performance as 'the breakout star of the bunch, the way John Boyega stole the not-dissimilar “Attack the Block” nearly a decade earlier.' The film then opened the 73rd Edinburgh International Film Festival (EIFF), it was also an official selection at the 49th International Film Festival Rotterdam (IFFR) and competed at the 23rd Tallinn Black Nights Film Festival (PÖFF), where it won the Grand Prix in the festival's youth and children's film competition. Shortly after the film, Juneja reprised his role in a music video for American hip-hop superduo Run The Jewels for their song "Out of Sight" featuring American rapper, 2 Chainz.

In 2020, Juneja played Young Shral in the CW sci-fi series Pandora. He wrote, directed, produced and starred in his comedy short 'Fuddu' which was nominated for best short film at the 2020 Uk Asian Film Festival. In 2022, he starred as romantic lead Harry in Pravesh Kumar's comedy film Little English which was supported by the British Film Institute . The film opened nationwide in cinemas and was nominated for best feature film at the 2023 National Film Awards UK before being acquired by the online streaming platform ITVX.

Juneja was a semi-regular in the CBBC sketch series Horrible Histories from 2023 to 2025 and portrayed Ravi in the 2024 BBC One comedy series The Cleaner. Juneja also wrote and starred in the comedy musical Pali and Jay's Ultimate Asian Wedding DJ Roadshow which was co-produced by Rifco Theatre Company and Soho Theatre. The show played in London before completing a 4-week run at the Edinburgh Festival Fringe and touring nationally. In 2025, Juneja appeared as a semi-regular in the CBBC series Horrible Science . He filmed a recurring role in Season 2 of Apple TV's 'The Completely Made-Up Adventures of Dick Turpin' before the series was scrapped.

== Filmography ==
Year	Title	Role	Notes	Refs.
2018	Doctors	Richard Huskerton	1 episode	
2020	Get Duked!	DJ Beetroot	Film	
2020	Pandora	Young Shral	1 episode	
2022	Little English	Harry	Film	
2023-2025	Horrible Histories	Various	6 episodes	
2024	The Cleaner	Ravi	1 episode	
2025	Horrible Science	Various	3 episodes	
TBA	The Detection Club	D.I. Greenway	Upcoming ten-part drama	
