= Revolver (2005 film) =

2005 fim by Guy Ritchie

- Theatrical release poster
- Directed by: Guy Ritchie
- Written by: Guy Ritchie; Luc Besson
- Produced by: Luc Besson; Virginie Silla; Marty Katz
- Starring: Jason Statham; Ray Liotta; Vincent Pastore; André Benjamin; Mark Strong; Terence Maynard; Francesca Annis
- Cinematography: Tim Maurice Jones
- Edited by: James Herbert; Ian Differ; Romesh Aluwihare
- Music by: Nathaniel Méchaly
- Production companies: EuropaCorp; Isle of Man Film
- Distributed by: Redbus Film Distribution (United Kingdom); EuropaCorp Distribution (France)
- Release dates: 11 September 2005 (TIFF); 22 September 2005 (United Kingdom); 28 September 2005 (France)
- Running time: 110 minutes
- Countries: United Kingdom; France
- Languages: English; Cantonese
- Budget: $27 million
- Box office: $6.7 million

Revolver is a 2005 action thriller film co-written and directed by Guy Ritchie, and starring Jason Statham, Ray Liotta, Vincent Pastore, and André Benjamin. An international co-production of the United Kingdom and France, the film centres on a revenge-seeking confidence trickster whose weapon is a universal formula that guarantees victory to its user, when applied to any game or confidence trick.

This is the fourth feature film by Ritchie and his third to centre on crime and professional criminals. It was released by Redbus Film Distribution in the United Kingdom on 22 September 2005. It performed poorly at the box office and received negative reviews. A reworked version was released to a limited number of the United States on 7 December 2007.

== Plot ==
In an unidentified city, cockney gangster and gambler Jake Green is released from prison for an unspecified crime.

Two years later, Jake and his brother Billy travel to a casino owned by crime boss Dorothy Macha (Ray Liotta), who had ordered Jake to commit the crime that led to his imprisonment. Though Billy is reluctant, the brothers have arrived to collect the debt that Jake believes the gangster owes them. Macha calls them up to where a high-rollers' game is taking place.

Jake bets a fortune on a chip toss and loses. Manipulating Macha into a sense of false security, he makes the same bet with him, but this time, he wins. Humiliated, Macha orders his right-hand man Paul to have Jake murdered.

As the brothers leave the casino, a loan shark named Zach tells Jake that he can help him. In the stairwell, Jake collapses and is rushed to the hospital. The doctors inform him they will have his test results in a few days. Later Jake arrives home without Billy, where Macha's assassin, Sorter, is waiting for him with a hail of gunfire.

Zach arrives and rescues Jake. Zach introduces Jake to his partner, Avi, and they offer him a deal: they will take all of his money, and he will do whatever they say. In exchange, they will protect Jake from Macha. They show Jake his medical file and tell him that he has a rare blood disease that will kill him within three days. Jake suspects he is being conned and leaves.

At a visit to his doctor, Jake is given the same prognosis. Jake returns to Avi and Zach's poolhall with a satchel of money and agrees to their terms. The mysterious men reveal that his money will be used to fund their money-lending enterprise, then question Jake about his time in prison. Jake explains that he was given a choice either to spend 14 years in the general prison population or 7 years in solitary confinement; he chose the latter.

During his stint in solitary confinement, Jake learned of a strategy ("the Formula") that is supposed to let its user win every game. The Formula itself was discovered by two unnamed men who inhabited the cells either side of him: a chess expert and a con man. The three men communicate about on confidence tricks and chess moves via messages hidden inside library books.

The chess expert and the con man plan to leave their cells simultaneously, and promise to take Jake with them, but when they disappear from their cells, they leave Jake behind to serve the remaining two years of his sentence. When Jake is released, he uses the Formula to win at various casinos.

Meanwhile, Macha brokers a cocaine deal with Lily Walker, the advisor of crime kingpin Sam Gold. Walker warns Macha that Sam Gold is not someone who tolerates failure. Jake accompanies Avi and Zach as they perform a heist of the cocaine. Desperate that he is now indebted to Gold, Macha sends Paul to appeal to his rival, Triad kingpin Lord John, to sell him replacement cocaine at a heavily inflated price. Lord John insultingly declines making a deal with his enemy. Jake, Zach and Avi then rob John for millions of dollars, framing Macha for the theft.

Furious, Lord John sends a hitwoman dressed as a waitress to kill Macha at his restaurant. Macha struggles with the hitwoman; she shoots his finger off before Macha kills her and Sorter kills her getaway driver as he attempts to flee. In retaliation, Macha has Sorter kill Lord John, then sends Paul and his henchmen to locate the stolen cocaine. The Triads deny any involvement, and implicate Jake even when Paul tortures them to death.

Zach and Avi have Jake donate all the money he has given them so far to a child's charity in Macha's name. Macha takes the credit, believing it will improve his reputation. He is later visited by Walker, who claims that Gold is furious at Macha's newfound publicity and his delaying of the deal. Macha pleads for more time, but Walker leaves with a cryptic threat.

Three days after Jake found out about his terminal diagnosis, Avi tells him he is "free" of his disease. Jake returns to his physician, who reveals that the original diagnosis was incorrect; Jake has a rare blood disease, but it is treatable and not terminal. Meanwhile, Macha, now believing Jake is the one conspiring against him, doubles down on the contract against him. His henchmen track him down to a house inhabited by Avi and Zach, but he evades them. In the chase, one of the hitmen accidentally shoots himself and the others believe that Jake killed him.

Jake meets Avi and Zach on a rooftop, where they are revealed as Jake's "neighbors" during his incarceration. Avi attempts to get Jake to understand the nature of the ego and to challenge his own lifelong investment in it. The men explain to Jake that by stripping him of the physical embodiment of ego (his money) they have freed him from Gold's "game"; Sam Gold's power is granted only by those who invest in him.

Elsewhere, Billy is betrayed by his bodyguard who lets Sorter and Paul into his home. Paul tortures Billy and threatens his daughter to find Jake. This unsettles Sorter and he kills Paul and all his companions to rescue the girl, but is mortally wounded in the process.

That night, an armed Jake breaks into the penthouse where Macha is sleeping. He kneels before the bed and asks Macha for forgiveness. Jake leaves in the elevator, which gets stuck at the 13th floor. Macha rushes down the stairs to meet Jake on the ground floor. While waiting in the elevator, Jake has a conversation in his mind in which decides to make a conscious effort to reverse everything his ego tells him to do. This is seen to be the truest and most fundamental application of the Formula.

As the doors open on Jake and he is about to leave the building, Macha holds him at gunpoint, but Jake refuses to fear him. He leaves Macha weeping in the foyer of his penthouse. Jake has rejected his ego, whereas Macha been consumed by it.

== Cast ==
- Jason Statham as Jake Green
- Ray Liotta as Dorothy Macha
- Vincent Pastore as Zach
- André Benjamin as Avi
- Mark Strong as Sorter
- Tom Wu as Lord John
- Terence Maynard as French Paul
- Andrew Howard as Billy
- Francesca Annis as Lily Walker
- Anjela Lauren Smith as Doreen
- Elana Binysh as Rachel

== Themes ==
Guy Ritchie, while conceiving and executing the film, was interested in Kabbalah. The film itself is laced with references to Kabbalistic ideas, symbols, and numerological references.

The trinity of Zach (either from Hebrew זְכַרְיָה Zechariah ′Yah has remembered′ or יִצְחָק Yitskhak [Isaac] '[he] will laugh'), Jake (from Hebrew יַעֲקֹב Yaʿaqov [Jacob] from the root עקב ʿqb 'to follow', 'to be behind', 'to supplant', 'circumvent', 'assail', 'overreach') and Avi (Hebrew אֲבִי ′my father′) are representative of Kabbalistic right, centre and left pillar energies, respectively. The 'left pillar' or 'left column' in Kabbalistic traditions is often associated with 'the feminine' and with the colour black. Jake's surname is "Green", and the colour green is associated with Netzach, the sphere ruled by Venus (Love) on the Tree of Life. Zach is a hefty, gargantuan, white man who 'dresses down' in a very archetypically 'masculine' way. Both masculinity and the colour white are associated with right column or right pillar energies in Kabbalistic traditions.

The number 32 comes up repeatedly. "The chess game has many mystical meanings. The Temple of Solomon was chequered like a chessboard, which has 64 squares and 32 pieces." The lift that Jake enters near the end of the movie has buttons for 32 floors.

The dollar bills shown in Jake's money bags have a denomination of 12; no explanation for this has yet been discovered.

== Soundtrack ==
Revolver: Original Soundtrack

Soundtrack album by various artists
- Released: 17 October 2005
- Genres: Film score Acid jazz Electronic music Contemporary classical music
- Length: 58:45
- Label: Recall Music For Films

According to director Guy Ritchie, the music for the film was initially intended to follow in a similar vein to his previous crime movies, Lock, Stock and Two Smoking Barrels and Snatch, in that it was to be primarily source-based (i.e. using nonoriginal music). Those source tracks would all have been classical in nature. However, during the production process, Ritchie changed his mind and decided to score a majority of the film with original music, leaving only some small sections to nonoriginal music tracks (such as the restaurant shoot-out during Lord John's attempted assassination of Dorothy Macha). Ritchie selected Nathaniel Méchaly to compose the score.

The score was performed by Méchaly on Mini Moog and other keyboards, with drummer Maxime Garoute.

All tracks were composed by Nathaniel Méchaly and Maxime Garoute, except where otherwise noted.

1. "Revolver" – 03:58
2. "Later That Night" – 02:02
3. "Atom's Tomb" (Electrelane) – 02:11
4. "The Heist" – 02:52
5. "Fear Me" – 03:42
6. "Mucchio Selvaggio" (Ennio Morricone, performed by 2raumwohnung) – 05:06
7. "Chess Room" – 02:03
8. "Sorter Shoot Out" – 01:56
9. "Purple Requiem" – 04:00
10. "3 Eddie Story" – 02:40
11. "End Casino" – 02:50
12. "Opera" (from Antonio Vivaldi's Nisi Dominus, third movement, performed by Emmanuel Santarromana) – 04:03
13. "Casino" – 01:54
14. "Jack Accident" – 02:02
15. "The Mental Traveler" – 04:08
16. "To Never Miss" – 01:18
17. "Ask Yourself" (Plastikman) – 08:51
18. "Gnossienne No. 1" (from Erik Satie performed by Alessandra Celletti) – 04:18
19. "Metropolitan" (Emmanuel Santarromana) – 3:18

== Home media ==
Extras featuring director Guy Ritchie

- The Concept: an interview with director Guy Ritchie and editor James Herbert on the subject of the film's conceptual and editorial development
- The Game: The Making Of Revolver
- Stills gallery (over 100 stills against film soundtrack)
- Seven deleted scenes with director's commentary
- Outtakes
- Music trailer

Audio

- Dolby Digital 5.1
- DTS Digital Surround 5.1

Aspect ratio

- 2.35 Widescreen / Color

Regional format

- Revolver is currently available in both Regions 1 and 2 on DVD.
  - Region 2 is the original 2005 theatrical release, while Region 1 is the 2007 re-edited version, created by Ritchie to simplify and/or clarify some plot points after criticism that the film was too hard to follow.

== Reception ==
=== Box office ===
As of 20 December 2005, the film had grossed $6,811,925.

=== Critical response ===
The film was generally panned by critics, who viewed it as pretentious with an over-complicated plot. On Rotten Tomatoes, it has an approval rating of 13% based on reviews from 67 critics. The consensus reads, "In attempting to meld his successful previous formulas with philosophical musings, Guy Ritchie has produced an incoherent misfire." Metacritic, which uses a weighted average, assigned the film a score of 25 out of 100, based on 21 critics, indicating "generally unfavorable" reviews. Reviews were so poor in the UK that a positive quote placed prominently on the film's poster, saying that the director was "back to his best" and attributed to the newspaper The Sun, in fact came from a promotional section of the Sun's website created and paid for by a public-relations agency on behalf of the film's distributors.

Some positive reviews, though, were published. Mark R. Leeper conceded that it was "a film for a narrow audience", but said that he personally rather "liked it" and gave it a score of 7/10. According to Brian Orndorf, Revolver "is the perfect movie for those who like to crack things open and dig around the innards", saying that it "reminded [him] quite a bit of Richard Kelly's film, Donnie Darko". He goes on to explain that "both films have a taste for the deliberately confusing, sharing scripts that take the viewer on a ride that requires much more than one simple viewing."
