= Ridley (TV series) =

British TV series

- Genre: Police procedural Crime drama
- Created by: Paul Matthew Thompson
- Written by: Paul Matthew Thompson; Jonathan Fisher; Julia Gilbert
- Directed by: Paul Gay; Bryn Higgins; Noreen Kershaw
- Starring: Adrian Dunbar; Bronagh Waugh; Terence Maynard; Georgie Glen; George Bukhari; Julie Graham; Bhavna Limbachia
- Theme music composer: Ben Foster
- Country of origin: United Kingdom
- Original language: English
- No. of series: 2
- No. of episodes: 8

Production
- Executive producer: Ingrid Goodwin
- Producer: Juliet Charlesworth
- Production locations: Lancashire, Yorkshire
- Cinematography: Tony Coldwell
- Running time: 90 mins (without ads), 120 mins (with ads)
- Production company: West Road Pictures

Original release
- Network: ITV
- Release: 28 August 2022 – present

Ridley is a British police procedural drama created and written by Paul Matthew Thompson, a screenwriter on the police drama Vera, and Jonathan Fisher. The series is co-produced by Adrian Dunbar, who also stars as the title character.

The first of four feature-length mysteries aired on ITV on 28 August 2022. Filming took place on location, mainly in rural areas in the north of England in Lancashire, the Yorkshire Dales and on the Pennine moors, with some scenes set in Bolton. A second series was commissioned in 2023 and began airing in the United States starting Sunday, 15 September 2024, and aired in UK on ITV from Sunday 10 August 2025.

== Premise ==
Alex Ridley (Adrian Dunbar) is a former detective inspector who is brought back in as a consultant some eighteen months after an early retirement, due to a nervous breakdown from having to come to terms with the loss of his wife and daughter in a house fire. He spends some of his retirement time as a pianist and singer in a jazz club of which he is a co-owner, and some episodes end with him singing. He assists former colleague Carol Farman (Bronagh Waugh), newly promoted to detective inspector.

== Cast ==
=== Main ===
- Adrian Dunbar as Alex Ridley, a retired detective inspector, now serving as a police consultant
- Bronagh Waugh as DI Carol Farman, team leader and Ridley's former protege
- Terence Maynard as DCI Paul Goodwin, Farman's boss
- Georgie Glen as Wendy Newstone, police pathologist and chief forensics officer
- George Bukhari as DC Darren Lakhan, a junior detective on Farman's team
- Julie Graham as Annie Marling, owner of the jazz club and a close friend of Ridley
- Bhavna Limbachia as Geri Farman, Carol's wife

=== Supporting ===
- Aidan McArdle as Michael Flannery, a convicted criminal who murdered Ridley's wife and daughter
- Jacquetta May as Kate Ridley, Ridley's wife, who died in the house fire (in flashbacks)
- Kitty Watson as Ella Ridley, Ridley's daughter, who also died in the house fire (in flashbacks)
- Tareq Al-Jeddal as Jack Farman, Carol and Geri's teenaged son

== Episodes ==
=== Series 1 (2022) ===
No. overall	No. in series	Title	Directed by	Written by	Original release date	UK viewers (millions)
1	1	"The Peaceful Garden"	Bryn Higgins	Jonathan Fisher and Paul Matthew Thompson	August 28, 2022	N/A
Tasked with solving a complex crime, Ridley investigates the murder of a sheep farmer, and the connections with the disappearance of a young child many years previously, and a convicted sex offender.
2	2	"Hospitality"	Noreen Kershaw	Jonathan Fisher and Paul Matthew Thompson	September 4, 2022	N/A
Ridley is asked to help with an investigation when the body of a young woman is discovered buried on the moors.
3	3	"Swansong"	Paul Gay	Julia Gilbert	September 11, 2022	N/A
Ridley agrees to help find the brother of a jazz singer who went missing 40 years ago, but the murder of a woman appears to be connected to the case.
4	4	"The Numbered Days"	Paul Gay	Jonathan Fisher and Paul Matthew Thompson	September 18, 2022	N/A
Ridley investigates when a man falls to his death from a balcony.

=== Series 2 (2024) ===
No. overall	No. in series	Title	Directed by	Written by	Original release date	UK viewers (millions)
5	1	"A Sleeping Tiger"	Noreen Kershaw	Paul Matthew Thompson	September 15, 2024	3.94
5	1	"A Sleeping Tiger"	Noreen Kershaw	Paul Matthew Thompson	September 23, 2024	3.94
Ridley investigates a jewellery heist that turns into a murder case.
6	2	"The Hollow Tree"	Isher Sahota	Julia Gilbert	September 29, 2024	N/A
6	2	"The Hollow Tree"	Isher Sahota	Julia Gilbert	October 6, 2024	N/A
Ridley is asked to get involved when a decomposed body is discovered in the depths of Hawsley Wood.
7	3	"Fool for Love"	Paul Gay	Michael Bhim	October 13, 2024	N/A
7	3	"Fool for Love"	Paul Gay	Michael Bhim	October 20, 2024	N/A
Ridley and the team investigate when a man is shot dead during a rave.
8	4	"The Memory Jar"	Noreen Kershaw	Paul Matthew Thompson	October 27, 2024	N/A
8	4	"The Memory Jar"	Noreen Kershaw	Paul Matthew Thompson	November 3, 2024	N/A
Ridley and the team are in a race against time when a local wife and mother goes missing in a picturesque village.
