= All Things to All Men (film) =

2013 British film

- Directed by: George Isaac
- Written by: George Isaac
- Produced by: George Isaac; Pierre Mascolo
- Starring: Gabriel Byrne; Rufus Sewell; Toby Stephens; Julian Sands
- Cinematography: Howard Atherton
- Edited by: Eddie Hamilton
- Music by: Thomas Wanker
- Production company: Cipher Films
- Distributed by: Universal Pictures
- Release date: 5 April 2013
- Running time: 84 minutes
- Country: United Kingdom
- Language: English
- Budget: £3 million

All Things to All Men (released as The Deadly Game on home media) is a 2013 British crime thriller film written and directed by George Isaac. It stars Gabriel Byrne, Rufus Sewell, Toby Stephens, and Julian Sands. Sewell plays a dirty cop who manipulates both the underworld and police in order to entrap a thief.

== Plot ==
After a stakeout, Parker, a dirty cop, arrests the son of mob boss Joseph Corso. Parker uses the arrest as leverage against Corso and forces him to recruit Riley, a thief that Parker wants to entrap. After Corso threatens him, Riley reluctantly agrees to perform a burglary for Corso, unaware that he is being manipulated by Parker. Parker's target, however, turns out to be more secure than expected, and Corso is unable to procure access codes. Riley balks at Corso's suggestion that they torture a worker for the codes, so Parker retrieves the codes from Scotland Yard's security system. However, Dixon, Parker's protege, becomes increasingly suspicious that there's more to Parker's scheme than he lets on. Dixon takes his concerns to Sands, Parker's long-time partner, who threatens to block Dixon's promotion if he continues to ask questions.

During the burglary, Riley and Corso's lieutenant, Cutter, are surprised to find much more money than planned. Riley questions how they could have lucked into such a major heist, but Cutter dismisses his concerns. Cutter later makes an attempt on Riley's life and tries to escape with the loot, which results in a high-speed chase through London. Cutter dies when his car crashes, and Riley takes the money. Meanwhile, Dixon convinces Sands to go straight, and Sands confronts Parker. Unwilling to give up his schemes, Parker kills Sands and attempts to frame Corso for the murder. Parker's plans go awry when Dixon survives an assassination attempt, and Parker becomes increasingly desperate to raise money to pay off his debts to powerful mobsters. Parker steals from several of his associates and plans his escape from London once he can retrieve the money stolen by Riley.

Riley sets up a meeting with Corso, and Parker uses his contacts to find the location. Corso, Riley, Parker, and Dixon converge on the meeting spot, and Parker kills Corso. Dixon arrives just as Parker is about to murder Riley and take the money. Disgusted, Dixon kills Parker and lets Riley escape. In the aftermath, Dixon meets with his superiors, who want him to keep silent about the details of the case. Dixon cynically compares Parker's actions to that of a mobster, and his superiors agree, though they had been aware of much of Parker's actions. In return for his silence, they offer him a promotion, and Dixon agrees, reasoning that the resulting scandal would be disastrous for the police force.

== Cast ==
- Gabriel Byrne as Joseph Corso
- Rufus Sewell as Jonathon Parker
- Toby Stephens as Riley
- Elsa Pataky as Sophia Peters
- Leo Gregory as Dixon
- Julian Sands as George Cutter
- Terence Maynard as Sands
- Pierre Mascolo as Mark Corso
- MC Harvey as Curtis Carter
- James Frain as District Attorney
- David Schofield as Police Commissioner
- Gil Darnell as Adrian Peters
- Tom Davis as Roberts

== Production ==
Shooting took place in London over seven weeks. Funding came in part from Mascolo's father. Isaac, who had never written a screenplay before, said that he could not find one that he wanted to film. Mascolo was supportive when Isaac suggested that he write his own. Influences included The Driver, The French Connection, Marathon Man, Layer Cake, The Long Good Friday, and clearly Training Day.

== Release ==
The film - as All Things to All Men - was initially certified by the BBFC on 22 March 2013 with a running time of 84m 18s, but was re-certified at 89m when released theatrically 5 April 2013. When released on DVD and Blu-ray in early 2014, it was re-titled The Deadly Game, and a 98m 49s cut was used, running to 94m 52s due to PAL speed-up.

== Reception ==
Rotten Tomatoes, a review aggregator, reports that 29% of 14 surveyed critics gave the film a positive review; the average rating was 4.5/10. Leslie Felperin of Variety wrote, "A moody star turn from Rufus Sewell elevates this overplotted British crime thriller". Peter Bradshaw of The Guardian rated it 3/5 stars and called it "a smart, engaging film" with a convoluted plot that does not stand up to scrutiny. Andrew Osmond of Empire rated it 2/5 stars and wrote that it "wants to be Heat" but "ends up closer to a high-gloss episode of The Bill." George Bass of Total Film rated it 3/5 stars and called it a "nimble thriller" that borrows from L.A. Confidential. Trevor Johnston of Time Out London rated it 2/5 stars and called it "another London-set crime flick with mostly unfulfilled ambitions to the cool sheen of a Michael Mann thriller." Alistair Harkness of The Scotsman rated it 3/5 stars and wrote, "All Things to All Men is the latest attempt to make a British Michael Mann-style crime epic based on a fundamental misunderstanding of what Michael Mann actually does as a filmmaker."
