= Emmanuel Bonami =

French voice actor

- Occupations: Voice actor, art director, actor
- Years active: 1997–present

Emmanuel Bonami is a French actor in numerous films and television series, and an art director in video games. He is also known as a voice actor for dubbing in French characters in films and video games, most notably for his role as Solid Snake in Metal Gear Solid.

== Early life ==
Bonami was living in London prior to his first dubbings. He has also lived in Turkey and Ukraine.

== Career ==
=== Voice actor and Metal Gear Solid (1997–2004) ===
Bonami's earliest participation as a voice actor was in 1997's Ghost in the Shell for its French dubbing. As one of his friend was working on the European localization of Metal Gear Solid with Konami, Bonami went in time to participate in the French dub of the titular game in Summer 1998. At the time of the recording, there were no English dub produced yet, and went on working with the Japanese version of the game along with one of Konami's Japanese project manager. Though the franchise did not receive dubs in other languages since Metal Gear Solid 2: Sons of Liberty, Bonami would unofficially dub Snake occasionally, such as the introduction scenes of Metal Gear Solid 4: Guns of the Patriots, and Metal Gear Solid V: The Phantom Pain as Venom Snake. After participating in this project, he would continue working as a voice actor for dubbing video games characters, such as Half-Life 2: Episode Two with Father Grigori in 2007, and Tom Clancy's Splinter Cell: Conviction in 2010.

=== Actor (2005–present) ===
Bonami moved out to Paris later in 2005. Shortly after, he has started working as an actor for movies and television shows, such as Wolf in 2019's Fornacis, and the eponymous character in 2014's lucid horror film Horsehead. In 2011, he has announced in an interview that he was making a short movie named Innocence. In 2018, he played the antagonist Zerda in the short TV series and adaptation of Michel Bussi's The Double Mother, Mother Is Wrong, in which he was marked by the scenario of both the book and its adaptation, and the character. In an interview held in September 2021, Bonami explained that he goes through numerous castings in various media, and works with a group of friends in short films.

In 2022, he dubbed the character of Jacob Lee, played by Josh Duhamel, in the video game The Callisto Protocol.

In 2023, he declared to the French media Eklecty-City his desire to play Solid Snake again if a remake would be born. He confided: "I am very attached to this character. We've been following each other for almost 25 years with Solid Snake. It's kind of crazy when you think about it... ¼ of a century! [...] I'll be really excited to see this iconic character once again". In 2026, Bonami reprised the role of Solid Snake as part of the Operation Silent Hunt event in Tom Clancy's Rainbow Six Siege.

In 2024, Bonami joined the cast of the NCIS spin-off, NCIS: Tony & Ziva, with Michael Weatherly and Cote de Pablo.

== Filmography ==
=== Film ===
Year	Title	Role	Note	Ref.
2007	13 m²	Civilian policeman		
2007	The Golden Compass		French dub	
2010	Djinns	Ballant		
2011	Ugly	Manu		
2011	L'histoire d'une mère	The Military		
2013	Macadam Baby	Policeman in custody 2		
2014	Horsehead	Horsehead		
2014	Dealer	Le Belge		
2015	Through the Air	Killer		
2016	Revenge	Antek Bando		
2018	Fornacis	Wolf		
2018	All the Gods in the Sky	Doctor Cartier		
2020	Family Swap	Colonel		
2020	French Blood	Mr. FROG		
2023	Vermin	Gilles		
2024	Le Mangeur d'âmes			

=== Short films ===
Year	Title	Role	Note	Ref.
2006	Au banquet des loups…	Cop 2		
2007	Final Gear	Solid Snake		
2009	Le prix à payer	Fred		
2009	Roches rouges	Papa		
2010	Mon père	The father		
2011	Wracked			
2012	Facteur X	Hostage		
2012	Innocence, Do Not Enter His World	Steve		
2012	Le réserviste	Village chief		
2013	Heritage	Father		
2013	Guet-apens	Inspector		
2014	Revolution	Terrorist		
2015	1/2	Father		
2015	Under My Skin	Priest		
2016	Exterminatus	Caron		
2017	On s'est fait doubler!	The cop		
2018	The Day My Mother Became A Monster	Father		
2020	Nuage	Father		
2020	Trois pissenlits dans un verre d'eau	Frédéric		
2021	Saturday night beaver	The Beaver		

=== Television ===
Year	Title	Role	Note	Ref.
2007	Martin Paris	Inspector DST		
2009	Ladies of the Law	Boulgakov		
2012	Ainsi soient-ils	Assistant Superior St. Cyprien		
2012	Zak	Policeman		
2013	Nos Chers Voisins	Philippe		
2016	Falco	Yannick Le Moulec		
2018	Insoupçonnable	Simon		
2018	Mother Is Wrong	Zerda		
2019	Candice Renoir	Pascal Louvier		
2022	Carpe Diem	Michel		
2022	In Tandem	Luc Forget		
2023	Machine			
2024	NCIS: Tony & Ziva			

=== Animation ===
Year	Title	Role	Note	Ref.
2010–2011	Digimon Fusion	Pharaohmon, Skullscorpiomon	French dub	
2016	Lastman		French dub	
2018	Robozuna	Vermis	French dub	

=== Video games ===
Year	Title	Role	Note	Ref.
1997	Ghost in the Shell			
1998	Colony Wars: Vengeance			
1998	Enemy Zero			
1999	Metal Gear Solid	Solid Snake	French dub	
2004	Mashed	Blue Jay		
2004	IndyCar Series 2005			
2004	Richard Burns Rally			
2004	Driv3r	Additional voices		
2006	Medieval II: Total War			
2006	Pokémon Battle Revolution			
2007	Fire Emblem: Radiant Dawn		French dub	
2007	Half-Life 2: Episode Two	Father Grigori	French dub	
2008	Viking: Battle for Asgard			
2008	Need For Speed Undercover			
2009	Inazuma Eleven 2	Astram Schiller, Inspector Gregory Smith		
2009	Empire: Total War			
2010	Inazuma Eleven 3	Sonny Raimon		
2010	Vanquish	Additional voices		
2010	Tom Clancy's Splinter Cell: Conviction			
2011	Total War: Shogun 2			
2012	Remember Me			
2012	Lego Batman 2: DC Super Heroes			
2013	Final Fantasy XIV: A Realm Reborn	Bremondt		
2014	Professor Layton vs. Phoenix Wright: Ace Attorney			
2014	Inazuma Eleven GO			
2014	GRID: Autosport			
2014	The Lego Movie Videogame			
2015	Yo-kai Watch Blasters			
2015	Dying Light			
2015	Final Fantasy XIV: Heavensward	Estinien		
2015	Mortal Kombat X			
2016	Dead by Daylight			
2017	Assassin's Creed: Origins			
2017	Final Fantasy XIV: Stormblood	Rasho		
2017	Final Fantasy XV: Episode Gladiolus	Additional voices		
2017	Brain Age: Concentration Training	Dr. Kawashima		
2017	LEGO Worlds			
2017	XCOM 2: War of the Chosen	Jeriah		
2017	Mirror's Edge: Catalyst			
2017	Mass Effect: Andromeda			
2018	Far Cry 5			
2018	Jurassic World: Evolution	George Lambert	French dub	
2018	WarioWare Gold	Jimmy T, M. Brillant		
2019	Marvel Dimension of Heroes	Hulk		
2020	Assassin's Creed Valhalla			
2020	No Straight Roads	DJ Zam, Announcer, Janitor	French dub	
2020	Star Wars: Squadrons			
2020	Tom Clancy's The Division 2: Warlords of New York – Expansion			
2021	Final Fantasy XIV: Endwalker	Susano	French dub	
2021	Necromunda: Hired Gun	Kal Jerico		
2021	Dungeons & Dragons: Dark Alliance			
2021	WarioWare: Get It Together!			
2022	The Callisto Protocol	Jacob Lee	French dub	
2022	Call of Duty: Modern Warfare II	Ghost	French dub	
2023	Final Fantasy XVI	Additional voices	French dub	
2023	Diablo IV	Additional voices	French dub	
2026	Tom Clancy's Rainbow Six Siege	Solid Snake	French dub	
TBD	Fairymm: the Insomniac Beauty			

=== Other roles ===
Year	Title	Note	Ref.
2001	Horizon	Additional voices	
2013	Remember Me	Art director	
2013	Professor Layton and the Azran Legacy	Art director	
2014	Professor Layton vs. Phoenix Wright: Ace Attorney	Art director	
2022	Dying Light 2: Stay Human	Director	
