= Little English =

- Directed by: Pravesh Kumar
- Written by: Pravesh Kumar
- Based on: There's Something About Simmy by Pravesh Kumar and Apurva Asrani
- Produced by: Lesley-Anne MacFarlane; Andrew St Maur; Dominique Unsworth
- Cinematography: Leigh Alner
- Edited by: Kam Parmar
- Production company: Resource Productions
- Release date: 24 June 2022; (LIFF)
- Running time: 98 minutes
- Country: United Kingdom
- Language: English

Little English is a 2022 British comedy film written and directed by Pravesh Kumar in his feature directorial debut, based on Kumar and Apurva Asrani's play There's Something About Simmy. The film premiered at the 2022 BFI London Indian Film Festival.

== Cast ==
- Rameet Rauli as Simmy
- Viraj Juneja as Harry
- Simon Rivers as Raj
- Seema Bowri as Gurbaksh
- Madhav Sharma as Bauji
- Goldy Notay as Mindy
- Ameet Chana as Bobby
- Nikki Patel as Sweetie
- Sanjeev Kohli as Ranjeet
- Mark Takeshi Ota as David
- Natasha Radski as Anna
- Shin Parwana as Arun Sr

== Production ==
The production received support from HOME Slough, Rifco Theatre Company, the Kickstart into Film programme, the Berkshire Film Office, and Slough Borough Council. Principal photography wrapped in August 2021, having taking place over the course of six weeks on location in Slough. Filming locations included Slough High Street, Farnham Road, Herschel Park and Church Street.

Julian Broad worked on the film as a lighting technician.

== Release ==
The film had a UK release date on 17 March 2023.
