= Rifco Theatre Company =

Rifco Theatre Company is a touring theatre company based in Watford, Hertfordshire, England, which focuses on bringing British South Asian stories to the stage, and audiences from the community into theatres. The company was founded in 1999 by director and writer Pravesh Kumar, the current artistic director, and is based in Watford Palace Theatre.

== Company history ==
Rifco was founded in 1999 when Kumar devised and acted in comedy sketch show Airport 2000: Asians in Transit, alongside Ajay Chhabra, Gurpreet Kaur Bhatti and Harvey Virdi. It initially played three sell out shows at Riverside Studios, and Kumar describes this as 'the accidental birth of Rifco'.

Since its inception, Rifco have toured nineteen original productions across the UK, with its twentieth touring in the Autumn of 2025.

Since 2013, Rifco have created a number of web series which broadcast across their social media. These range from sketch comedies to documentary shorts.

In 2015, Rifco launched their Associates programme which aims to nurture and uplift emerging British South Asian creatives.

In 2018, Ameet Chana was appointed Associate Director of the company.

Notable actors who have worked with Rifco include Shabana Azmi, Divya Seth Shah, Tez Ilyas, Navin Kundra, Harvey Virdi and Divian Ladwa.

Rifco is an Arts Council National Portfolio Organisation.

== Past productions ==
Year	Title	Writer	Director	Notes	Ref.
1999	Airport 2000 - Asians In Transit	Ajay Chhabra, Gurpreet Kaur Bhatti, Pravesh Kumar and Harvey Virdi	Collaborative		
2000 2003	Bollywood 2000 - Yet Another Love Story	Pravesh Kumar	Pravesh Kumar		
2005	The Deranged Marriage	Pravesh Kumar	Pravesh Kumar		
2006	Meri Christmas	Harvey Virdi	Pravesh Kumar		
2007	There's Something About Simmy	Pravesh Kumar	Pravesh Kumar	Co-produced with Theatre Royal Stratford East	
2009	Where's My Desi Soulmate?	Sonia Likhari, Harvey Virdi	Pravesh Kumar		
2011	Britain's Got Bhangra	Pravesh Kumar (book), Dougal Irvine (lyrics), Sumeet Chopra (composer)	Pravesh Kumar	Co-produced with Watford Palace Theatre and Warwick Arts Centre	
2013	Break The Floorboards	Yasmeen Khan	Pravesh Kumar	Co-produced with Watford Palace Theatre	
2014	Happy Birthday Sunita	Harvey Virdi	Pravesh Kumar	Co-produced with Watford Palace Theatre, in association with Arena Theatre, Wolverhampton	
2015	The Deranged Marriage (revival)	Pravesh Kumar	Pravesh Kumar	Co-produced with Watford Palace Theatre	
2016	Laila The Musical	Pravesh Kumar (book), Dougal Irvine (lyrics), Sumeet Chopra (composer)	Pravesh Kumar	Co-produced with Watford Palace Theatre and Queen's Theatre, Hornchurch	
2017	Miss Meena and the Masala Queens	Harvey Virdi	Pravesh Kumar	Co-produced with Watford Palace Theatre, in association with Warwick Arts Centre	
2017	Pyar Actually	Sukh Ojla	Pravesh Kumar		
2018	Dishoom!	Gurpreet Kaur Bhatti	Pravesh Kumar	Co-produced with Watford Palace Theatre and Oldham Coliseum Theatre	
2019	Mushy: Lyrically Speaking	Pravesh Kumar (book), Raxstar (lyrics), Niraj Chag (composer)	Ameet Chana		
2022	Abigail's Party	Mike Leigh	Pravesh Kumar	Co-produced with Watford Palace Theatre	
2022	Glitterball	Yasmin Wilde	Pravesh Kumar	Co-produced with Watford Palace Theatre	
2023	Happy Birthday Sunita (revival)	Harvey Virdi	Pravesh Kumar	Co-produced with Watford Palace Theatre	
2024	Frankie Goes To Bollywood	Pravesh Kumar (book), Niraj Chag (songs and music), Tasha Taylor-Johnson (songs and lyrics)	Pravesh Kumar	Co-produced with Watford Palace Theatre and HOME Manchester	
2024	Pali and Jay's Ultimate Asian Wedding DJ Roadshow	Viraj Juneja	Ameet Chana		
2025	Surinderella	Pravesh Kumar	Ameet Chana	Co-produced with Wolverhampton Grand Theatre, in association with Imagine Theatre and Watford Palace Theatre	

== Digital shows ==
- Mummy Ji Presents (2012)
- Young Asian Comedy Workshop (2016)
- The Desi Lockdown (2020)
- Leave The Plastic On (2021, 2 series)
- GenerAsians - The Ugandan Expulsion (2022)

== Awards ==
Year	Award	Nominated work	Category	Result	Ref.
2011	Offie	Britain's Got Bhangra	People's Favourite Musical	Won	
2022	Offie	Glitterball	Most Promising Playwright	Nominated	
2024	Offie	Frankie Goes To Bollywood	Costume Design	Nominated	
2024	Offie	Frankie Goes To Bollywood	Lighting Design	Nominated	
2013	Asian Media Awards	Break The Floorboards	Best Live Event	Won	
2015	Asian Media Awards	Happy Birthday Sunita	Best Stage Production	Nominated	
2016	Asian Media Awards	Laila The Musical	Best Stage Production	Nominated	
2017	Asian Media Awards	Miss Meena and the Masala Queens	Best Stage Production	Nominated	
2024	Asian Media Awards	Frankie Goes To Bollywood	Outstanding Stage Performance (Laila Zaidi)	Nominated	
2024	Asian Media Awards	Frankie Goes To Bollywood	Best Stage Production	Nominated	
2024	Asian Media Awards	Pali and Jay's Ultimate Asian Wedding DJ Roadshow	Best Live Event	Nominated	
