= Niraj Chag =

British musician (born 1976)

Niraj Chag is a London-based musical artist and composer. His musical style mixes Indian classical influences with contemporary stylings and layered, complex beats. Niraj's tracks were initially released on the Outcaste record label and later on his own Buzz-erk label. He has written and produced three albums released under his own name: Along the Dusty Road (2006), The Lost Souls (2009) and Mud Doll (2015).

== Early life ==
Chag grew up in Southampton, England. His family is Gujarati, and his parents moved to the UK from East Africa in the 1970s. His father worked on a bus and at a factory. Chag started making music at age 11 and was involved in various musical projects including a hip-hop group and his brother's Bollywood cover band. Rejected from multiple musical degree programs, Chag is a self-taught musician.

== Career ==
=== Composing for theatre, film, radio, and TV ===
Niraj has worked on the British Asian musical Baiju Bawra, which opened in London's Stratford East Theatre in 2002 and was adapted into a radio play by the BBC Asian Network in 2011 and numerous soundtracks, including, for television, the BAFTA- and Emmy-nominated Power of Art (2007), The Age of Terror (BBC, 2008), Darwin's Dangerous Idea (BBC 2008), City Beneath The Waves: Pavlopetri (2011), Origins of Us (BBC, 2011), Jimmy and The Whale Whisperer (Channel 4, 2012), Rise of the Continents (2013), Our Girl (2013), Sex and the City (HBO, 2003), The Mystery of Romes X-Tomb (2013), Food Prices: The Shocking Truth (Channel 4, 2014), Worlds Busiest Railway (2015), Six Degrees Of Separation (2015), The Secrets Of Your Food (2017) and, for film, All in Good Time (2012).

In 2007 he composed the music for the Olivier award-winning stage play Rafta Rafta (Royal National Theatre).

According to notes from his website Niraj has composed music for over 20 dance productions including Shobana Jeyasinghs Where Is Dev?/Classic Cuts(Royal Opera House, 2012).

In 2012, Niraj composed the music for the West End Musical Wah! Wah! Girls and the Royal Shakespeare Company's production of Much Ado About Nothing. In 2014, Niraj composed the music for The West Yorkshire Playhouse production of The Jungle Book and, in 2015, he composed the music for The Royal National Theatre's production of Dara. In 2017, he created the sound design and score for the RIFCO Arts production of Miss Meena and The Masala Queens. In 2018, he composed the music for The Captive Queen at Shakespeare's Globe Theatre. In 2024 he composed the music for the Rifco Arts Musical production of Frankie Goes To Bollywood and The Royal Shakespeare Company's Production of The Buddha Of Suburbia for which he was nominated for a Whatsonstage award.

Having worked on the BBC Radio 4 adaptations of The Mahabharata and The Ramayana Niraj collaborated with radio production company Wise Buddah to create the new station sound for the BBC Asian Network in 2015. In 2017 he created the music for one of BBC 1's new 'Oneness' idents featuring a troop of Bhangra dancers.

In 2025 he received the ACTA Award for Contemporary Music.

=== Albums ===
Niraj's first professional experience in music was working on Mark Hill's label. At age 19, Chag moved to Outcaste Records, a label that focused on releasing Asian music. Niraj released the single "Walk Alone" and contributed four tracks to the album Outcaste New Breed.

Chag worked on his debut album, Along the Dusty Road (2007), for 3 years as a side project to his score composition work. The album includes songs in 6 different languages. In May 2006 he released "Bangles", the first song from his album Along the Dusty Road, on the Buzz-erk label. According to notes from his website, "Bangles" was inspired by the journey his grandmother made in migrating to the UK from India via Africa. "Bangles" and "Khwaab" attracted the attention of new fans less familiar with his earlier work, both songs being playlisted on BBC and local radio stations

The success of the tracks led to Niraj recording a BBC session at their Maida Vale Studios, a live set at the inaugural BBC Electric Proms, and the song "Nomad" was selected to be the iTunes free download of the week in June 2006.

In 2006, Niraj won "Best Asian Underground" at the UK Asian Music Awards.

Chag's follow-up album The Lost Souls was released in early March 2009, featuring the singles "Baavaria" and "Ur Jaa." On 24 October 2009 Chag performed in concert with a live band at LSO St Luke's in London, followed by a concert at the CBSO Centre in Birmingham.

Niraj's third album Mud Doll was released in June 2015 and featured the singles "Rang Diya" and "Sab Qurban".

In April 2010 Niraj launched a new online 'music and life' blog called EasternSoul.net with the intention of 'providing an alternative to the modern trend of throwaway "here today, gone tomorrow" music.' EasternSoul.net features a podcast, interviews and features on contemporary Asian musicians

== Discography ==
- Outcaste New Breed (Outcaste Records, 1998) Chag contributed 4 tracks to this compilation
- Along the Dusty Road (Buzz-erk Group, 2006)
- Rafta Rafta Soundtrack Album (Buzz-erk Group, 2007)
- The Lost Souls (Buzz-erk Group, 2009)
- Mud Doll (Buzz-erk Group, 2015)
