= Watford Palace Theatre =

Theatre and cinema in Watford, Hertfordshire, England

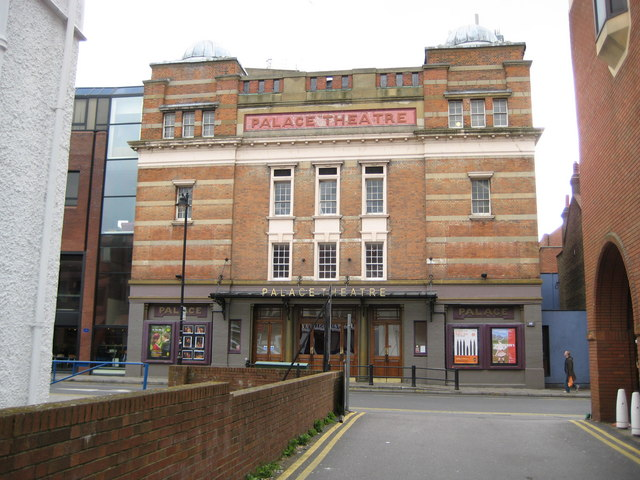
- Watford Palace Theatre from the outside in 2008
- Interactive map of Watford Palace Theatre
- Address: 20 Clarendon Road
- Location: Watford, England
- Coordinates: 51.6572°N 0.3972°W
- Capacity: 600
- Type: Theatre
- Public transit: Watford Junction railway station

Construction
- Built: 1908
- Opened: 14 December 1908
- Renovated: 2004
- Architect: H.M. Theobald
- Builder: Barker Brothers

Tenant
- RIFCO Arts

Website
- watfordpalacetheatre.co.uk

Watford Palace Theatre, opened in 1908, is an Edwardian Grade II listed building in Watford, Hertfordshire. The 600-seat theatre on Clarendon Road was refurbished in 2004. It houses its own rehearsal room, wardrobe, cafe and bar.

== History ==
The theatre was built for the Watford Hippodrome Co., Ltd. The foundation stone of what was to become the Palace Theatre was laid on 3 June 1908. Five days later Mr H.M. Theobald, the architect, lodged the notification of his intention to build the theatre. Construction was undertaken by Barker Brothers of Maidenhead, and took six months, opening on 14 December 1908. The opening proprietors were the Watford Palace of Varieties Co., the Managing Director: Mr. T.M. Sylvester.

In early days it put on variety shows and plays, mostly imported from other theatres. Variety artists who appeared at the Palace included Marie Lloyd, Evie Greene and Lottie Lennox. The theatre also puts on regular Christmas pantomimes.

For almost a decade (around the early 1960s), when Peter Cleall began his career at the Palace, the theatre was managed by actor Jimmy Perry, best known for co-writing the television series Dad's Army

In September 2004, the theatre re-opened after a two-year £8.8million Lottery funded refurbishment, which included more public space, two bars, a daytime café, air cooling and new seating. Access to the building was improved by the introduction of a lift to all levels, ramps and automated front doors.

In October 2015, the theatre won the Promotion of Diversity Award (joint winners with Leicester Curve) at the UK Theatre Awards 2015.

RIFCO Arts is the resident theatre company.

== Productions ==
The theatre has been producing work for over 100 years. Alongside touring productions, the theatre provides programmes in new writing.
