= Harvey Virdi =

British actress

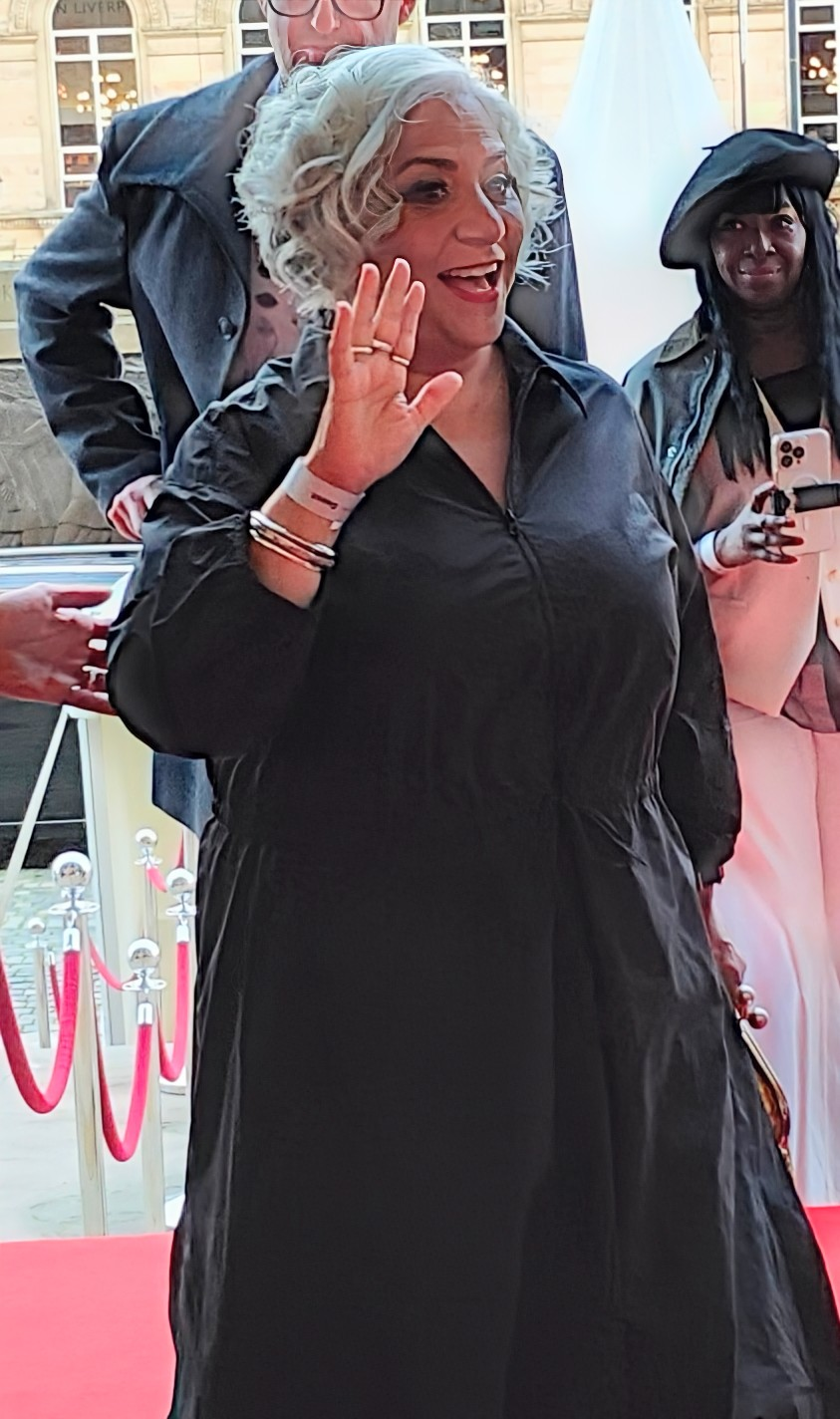
- Virdi in 2025
- Education: Academy Drama School
- Occupation: Actress
- Years active: 1994–present

Harvey Virdi is a British actress of Indian descent. She trained at Academy Drama School in London.

== Career ==
Her theatre credits include The Borrowers (at the Sherman Theatre, Cardiff), Tiger Country and Tales From The Harrow Road (Hampstead Theatre), When We are Married, Twelfth Night (in 1997 and 2004,), Romeo and Juliet (in 2000,), Square Circle and Playboy of the Asian World (all at the Leicester Haymarket), Airport 2000 (Riverside Studios, Hammersmith), and Jatinder Verma's production of Exodus (Tara Arts/BAC). In 2003, she was 'Mrs Peachum' in a touring production of The Threepenny Opera for the Royal National Theatre. In 2004 she gave a critically acclaimed Maria in an Indian-themed production of Twelfth Night at the Albery Theatre. She also appeared as Nina Mandal, in Coronation Street. She was a supporting cast member in two seasons of Class Dismissed.

Her film credits include Bend It Like Beckham, Anita and Me, Thunderbirds, Bride and Prejudice, The Mistress of Spices, Honour, Jadoo, and Brick Lane. Television credits include The Kumars at No. 42 (as the family's interfering landlady, 'Hawney'), Boohbah (as 'Mrs. Lady'), Doctors, Lucky Man (as 'Shefali Malhotra'), and Whose Baby?. She has also appeared in various radio plays including in 2009, in "The Inheritance Of Loss By Kiran Desai".

As a writer, her credits include 'There's Something About Simmy', 'The Deranged Marriage', 'Miss Meena & the Masala Queens' 2017 RIFCO Arts, 'Happy Birthday Sunita', 2014 RIFCO Arts and 'Meri Christmas' 2006 RIFCO Arts.

She appeared in Citizen Khan as regular character 'Mrs Malik'.

In May 2017 it was announced Virdi had joined the cast of Channel 4 soap Hollyoaks playing Dr. Misbah Maalik. She departed on 1 June 2020, but this was soon confirmed as a temporary exit, with Virdi returning to the role on 21 September 2020.

== Filmography ==
Film
Year	Title	Role	Notes
1998	Guru in Seven	Amarjeet	
2002	Anita and Me (film)Anita & Me	Auntie	
2002	Bend It Like Beckham	Teetu's Mum	
2004	Bride & Prejudice	Mrs. Lamba	
2004	Thunderbirds	Onaha	
2005	The Mistress of Spices	Geeta's Mother	
2006	Venus	Art School Teacher	
2007	Brick Lane	Razia	
2008	The Blue Tower	Minnie	
2009	No Honour No Choice	Mother	Short
2010	The Duchess of Malfi	Cariola	Video of Stage on Screen production
2010	Doctor Faustus	Vintner / Envy / Paramour	Video of Greenwich Theatre production
2010	Ashes	Samina	Short
2010	It's a Wonderful Afterlife	Overbearing Mother	
2011	Swinging with the Finkels	Indian Woman	
2011	Lazy Uncle	Nimmi / Auntie	Short
2012	Naachle London	Mrs. Patel	
2012	The Telemachy	Hafa	
2012	Italian Movies	Wife	
2013	With Marjorie Gone	Roshni (Nizams Mother)	Short
2014	Honour	Mother	
2017	Lies We Tell	Banu	

Television
Year	Title	Role	Notes
1996	Staying Alive	Dr. Claire Ryan	Series 1: Episode 1
1996	The Bill	Parminda Kulkarni	Episode: "Kick Me Hard"
1996, 2009	Casualty	Nurse Reena Pal (1996); Shaheen (2009)	Episode: "Night Moves" and "And Then There Were Three"
2003	Boohbah	Mrs. Lady	26 episodes
2003	Hear the Silence	Dr. Ash's receptionist	Two-part television film
2004	Whose Baby?	Solicitor	Television film
2004, 2008, 2011, 2014, 2015	Doctors	Parminder Shand (2004); Hamsa Shah (2008); Nina Sarwar (2011); Selma Chaudhary (2014); Harshida Sutaria (2015)	Episodes: "Ill Feelings", "Managing Expectations", "Protection", "The Fires of Midwinter" and "Mother to Be"
2005	Cherished	Woman Doctor	Episode: "It's Alright, I Am a Doctor"
2006	Murphy's Law	Isha Iqbal	Series 4: Episode 3
2006, 2012	Holby City	Shirley O'Donnell (2006); Molly Sharma (2012)	Episodes: "The Very Thought of You" and "Kids' Stuff"
2007	Britz	Kaneez	Television film
2008	Coronation Street	Nina Mandal	Recurring role; 22 episodes
2011	Little Crackers	Auntie Nimmi	Episode: "Sanjeev Bhaskar's Little Cracker: Papaji Saves Christmas"
2011	The Jury	Nurse	2 episodes
2012–2016	Citizen Khan	Mrs. Malik	Recurring role; 16 episodes
2014	The Kumars	Hawney	All 6 episodes
2016	Class Dismissed	Various	11 episodes
2016–2017	The Windsors	Doctor	2 episodes
2017	Lucky Man	Sheffali	Episode: "Luck Be a Lady"
2017	Not Going Out	Counsellor	Episode: "Marriage Guidance"
2017–present	Hollyoaks	Misbah Maalik	Series regular

== Awards and nominations ==
Year	Award	Category	Result	Ref.
2018	2018 British Soap Awards	Best Actress	Nominated	
2019	24th National Television Awards	Serial Drama Performance	Nominated	
2019	2019 British Soap Awards	Best Actress	Nominated	
2019	Inside Soap Awards	Best Actress	Nominated	
2019	Digital Spy Reader Awards	Best Soap Actor (Female)	Third	
2022	2022 British Soap Awards	Best Dramatic Performance	Nominated	
2022	27th National Television Awards	Serial Drama Performance	Nominated	
2022	Inside Soap Awards	Best Actress	Shortlisted	
2022	I Talk Telly Awards	Best Soap Performance	Nominated	
